= Ventenat =

Ventenat is a surname. Notable people with the surname include:

- Étienne Pierre Ventenat (1757–1808), French botanist, brother of Louis
- Louis Ventenat (1765–1794), French priest and naturalist

== See also ==
- Ventenata, a genus of plants in the grass family
