= European and American voyages of scientific exploration =

1600–1930 period of research-driven expeditions

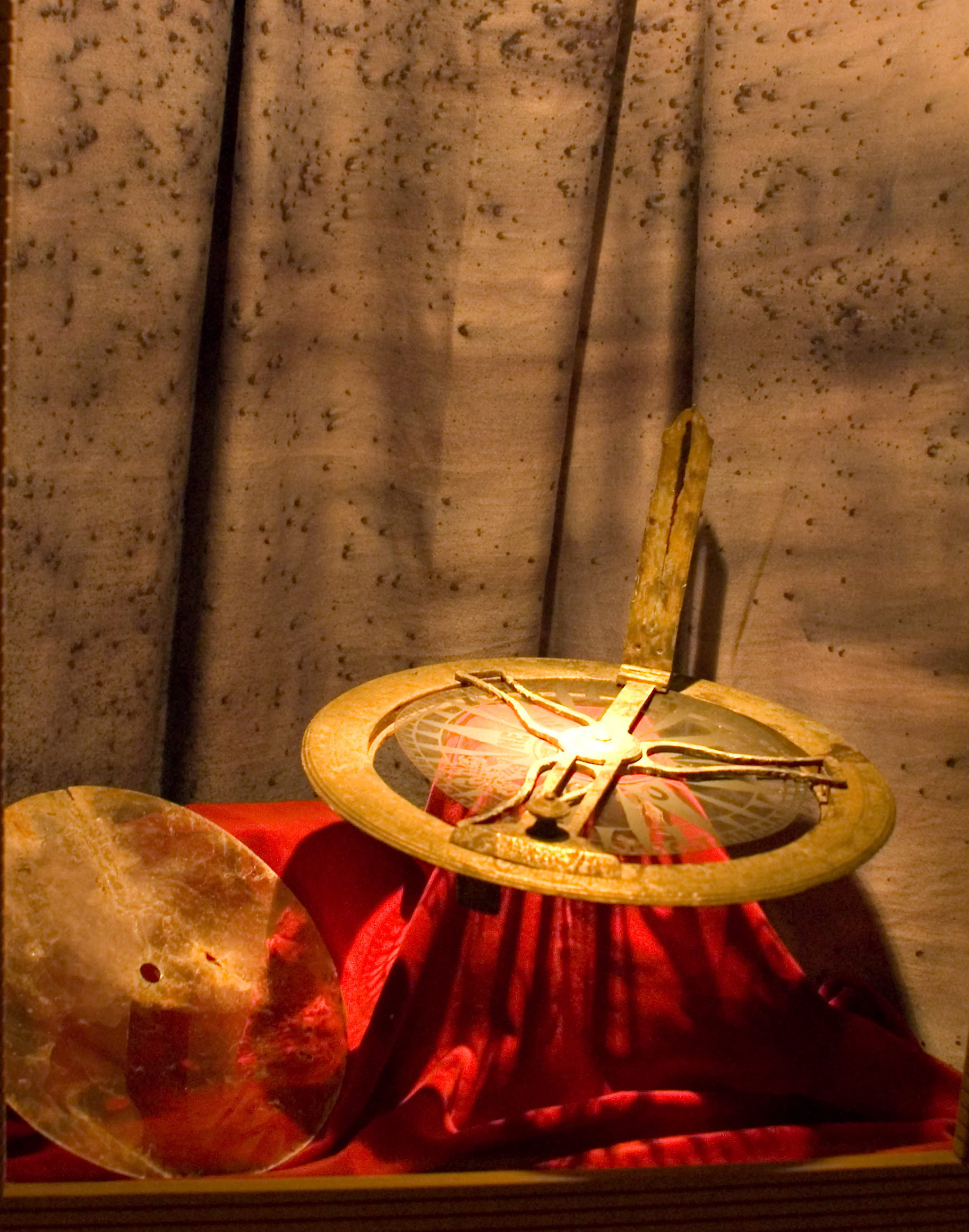
Bearing compass (18th century)

The era of European and American voyages of scientific exploration followed the Age of Discovery and were inspired by a new confidence in science and reason that arose in the Age of Enlightenment. Maritime expeditions in the Age of Discovery were a means of expanding colonial empires, establishing new trade routes and extending diplomatic and trade relations to new territories, but with the Enlightenment scientific curiosity became a new motive for exploration to add to the commercial and political ambitions of the past. See also List of Arctic expeditions and List of Antarctic expeditions.

== Maritime exploration in the Age of Discovery ==
From the early 15th century to the early 17th century the Age of Discovery had, through Portuguese seafarers, and later, Spanish, Dutch, French and English, opened up southern Africa, the Americas (New World), Asia and Oceania to European eyes: Bartholomew Dias had sailed around the Cape of southern Africa in search of a trade route to India; Christopher Columbus, on four journeys across the Atlantic, had prepared the way for European colonisation of the New World; Ferdinand Magellan had commanded the first expedition to sail across the Atlantic and Pacific oceans to reach the Maluku Islands and was continued by Juan Sebastián Elcano, completing the first circumnavigation of the Earth.

The Francisco Hernández expedition (1570–1577) (Spanish: Comisión de Francisco Hernández a Nueva España) is considered to be the first scientific expedition to the New World, led by Francisco Hernández de Toledo, a naturalist and physician of the Court of King Philip II, who was highly regarded in Spain because of his works on herbal medicine. Among some of the most important achievements of the expedition were the discovery and subsequent introduction in Europe of a number of new plants that did not exist in the Old World, but that quickly gained acceptance and became very popular among European consumers, such as pineapples, cocoa, corn, and many others.

During the 17th century the naval hegemony started to shift from the Portuguese and Spanish to the Dutch and then the British and French. The new era of scientific exploration began in the late 17th century as scientists, and in particular natural historians, established scientific societies that published their researches in specialist journals. The British Royal Society was founded in 1660 and encouraged the scientific rigour of empiricism with its principles of careful observation and deduction. Activities of early members of the Royal Society served as models for later maritime exploration. Hans Sloane (1650–1753) was elected a member in 1685 and travelled to Jamaica from 1687 to 1689 as physician to the Duke of Albemarle (1653–1688) who had been appointed Governor of Jamaica. In Jamaica Sloane collected numerous specimens which were carefully described and illustrated in a published account of his stay. Sloane bequeathed his vast collection of natural history 'curiosities' and library of over 50,000 bound volumes to the nation, prompting the establishment in 1753 of the British Museum. His travels also made him an extremely wealthy man as he patented a recipe that combined milk with the fruit of Theobroma cacao (cocoa) he saw growing in Jamaica, to produce milk chocolate. Books of distinguished social figures like the intellectual commentator Jean Jacques Rousseau, Director of the Paris Museum of Natural History Comte de Buffon, and scientist-travellers like Joseph Banks, and Charles Darwin, along with the romantic and often fanciful travelogues of intrepid explorers, increased the desire of European governments and the general public for accurate information about the newly discovered distant lands.

One of the earliest French expeditions on the coasts of Africa, South America and through the Strait of Magellan was made by a squadron of French men-of-war under the command of M. de Gennes in 1695–97. The young French explorer, engineer and hydrographer François Froger described this expedition in his A Relation of a Voyage (1699).

== Maritime exploration in the Age of Enlightenment ==
By the 18th century maritime exploration had become safer and more efficient with technical innovations that vastly improved navigation and cartography: improvements were made to the theodolite, octant, precision clocks, as well as the compass, telescope, and general shipbuilding techniques. From the mid-18th century through the 19th century scientific missions mapped the newly discovered regions, brought back to Europe the newly discovered fauna and flora, made hydrological, astronomical and meteorological observations and improved the methods of navigation. This stimulated great advances in the scientific disciplines of natural history, botany, zoology, ichthyology, conchology, taxonomy, medicine, geography, geology, mineralogy, hydrology, oceanography, physics, meteorology etc. – all contributing to the sense of "improvement" and "progress" that characterized the Enlightenment. Often these missions brought together diverse researchers of different ethnic and regional background, thus creating a "transnational culture of expertise". Artists were used to record landscapes and indigenous peoples, while natural history illustrators captured the appearance of organisms before they deteriorated after collection. Some of the world's finest natural history illustrations were produced at this time and the illustrators changed from informed amateurs to fully trained professionals acutely aware of the need for scientific accuracy.

By the middle of the 19th century, all of the world's major land masses, and most of the minor ones, had been discovered by Europeans and their coastlines charted. This marked the end of this phase of science as the Challenger Expedition of 1872–76 began exploring the deep seas beyond a depth of 20 or 30 meters. In spite of the growing community of scientists, for nearly 200 years science had been the preserve of wealthy amateurs, educated middle classes and clerics. At the start of the 18th century, most voyages were privately organized and financed, but by the second half of the century these scientific expeditions, like James Cook's three Pacific voyages under the auspices of the British Admiralty, were instigated by government. In the late 19th century, when this phase of science was drawing to a close, it became possible to earn a living as a professional scientist although photography was beginning to replace the illustrators. The exploratory sailing ship had gradually evolved into the modern research vessels. From now on maritime research in new European colonies in America, Africa, Australia, India and elsewhere, would be carried out by researchers within the occupied territories themselves.

=== Chronology of voyages ===
This compendium of voyages of scientific exploration provides an overview of maritime scientific research carried out at the time of the Enlightenment in Europe. Published journals and accounts are included with the individual voyages.

==== 1735–39: French Geodesic Mission ====
The French Geodesic Mission to the Equator was an 18th-century expedition to what is now Ecuador carried out for the purpose of measuring the roundness of the Earth and measuring the length of a degree of latitude at the Equator. The mission was one of the first geodesic (or geodetic) missions carried out under modern scientific principles, and the first major international scientific expedition.

- Ships: from Spain to Colombia, El Conquistador and Incendio; from France to Colombia, Portefaix; from Colombia to Ecuador, San Cristóbal; from Ecuador to Chile and return, Nuestra Señora de Belén and Rosa, and finally from Ecuador to France Liz, Nuestra Señora de la Deliberanza, Luis Erasmo, Marquesa de Antin (among a convoy of 53 ships).
- French astronomers: Charles Marie de La Condamine (1701–1774), Pierre Bouguer (1698–1758) and Louis Godin (1704–1760).
- Spanish geographers: Jorge Juan y Santacilla (1713–1773) and Antonio de Ulloa (1716–1795).
- Assistants: Joseph de Jussieu (1704–1779) and Jean Godin (1713–1792).
- Ecuadoran geographer and topographer: Pedro Maldonado (1704–1748).
- Publications: Relación histórica del viaje a la América meridional, Jorge Juan and Ulloa, 1748; Figure de la terre determine, Bouguer, 1749; Journal du voyage, La Condamine, 1751; Le procès des étoiles, 1735–71, ISBN 978-2-232-10176-2, 978-2-232-11862-3.

==== 1764–66: HMS Dolphin ====
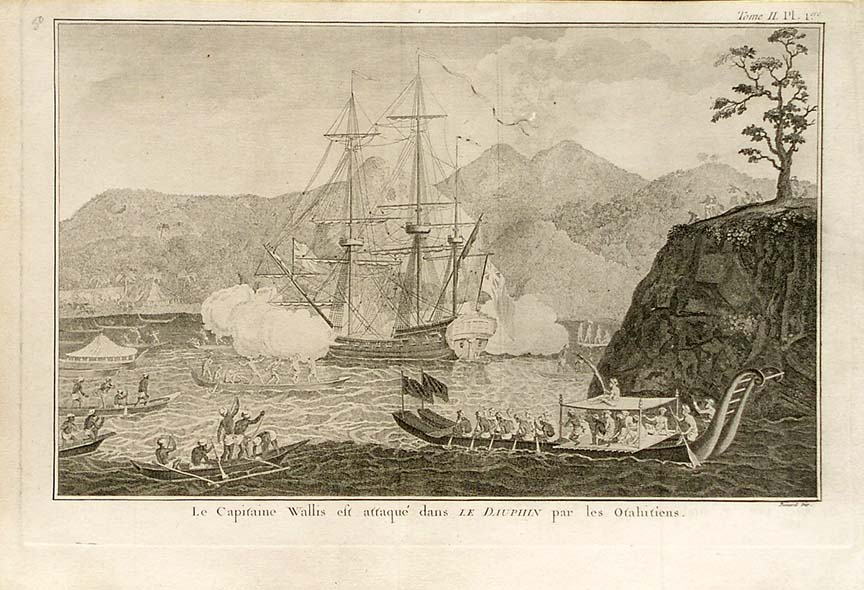
HMS Dolphin at Tahiti in 1767

Considered the first scientific voyage undertaken by the Royal Navy, its primary purpose was the discovery of new lands in the South Atlantic Ocean. It was during this trip that several islands of the Tuamotu archipelago were discovered. Dolphin was a 24-gun post ship launched in 1751 and used as a survey ship from 1764, making two circumnavigations under the command of John Byron and Samuel Wallis. She was broken up in 1777.

- Captain: John Byron (1723–1786).
- Publications: J. Byron, A Voyage round the world. (London, 1767), translated into French the same year under the title Journey around the world in 1764 and 1765, on the English warship "The Dolphin", commissioned by Vice-Admiral Byron ... (Paris).

==== 1766–68: HMS Dolphin and HMS Swallow ====
A circumnavigation by the English navigator Samuel Wallis, on board HMS Dolphin, accompanied by Philip Carteret on the consort ship Swallow. In August 1766, the two ships passed through the Strait of Magellan. In December 1766, conflicts between the two captains led to the separation of the ships. Dolphin reached Tahiti in June 1767, where Wallis and the British opened fire on the native Tahitians with the ship’s cannons, killing many Tahitians. There was also an exploitative trade and the transfer of disease, which was often devastating for indigenous societies. Meanwhile, Philip Carteret in Swallow explored and studied the Solomon Islands, New Ireland (island) (now part of Papua New Guinea) and the islands of the Indonesian archipelago (Sulawesi among others). The expedition also stopped in Batavia from June to September 1768 and returned to London in March 1769.

- Captains: Samuel Wallis (1728–1795) (leader of the expedition), Philip Carteret (1733–1796) (Commander of Swallow which was separated from the Dolphin and returned to its point of departure a year later).
- Second Lieutenant: Tobias Furneaux (1735–1781).

==== 1766: HMS Niger ====
This British ship explored Newfoundland and Labrador with Constantine Phipps aboard and Thomas Adams (Captain?), and with Joseph Banks also aboard. HMS Niger was a 33-gun fifth-rate launched in 1759, converted to a prison ship in 1810 and renamed Negro in 1813. She was sold in 1814.

- Captain: Thomas Adams (?–1770)
- Also aboard: Joseph Banks (1743–1820) and Constantine Phipps.

==== 1766–69: La Boudeuse and L'Étoile ====
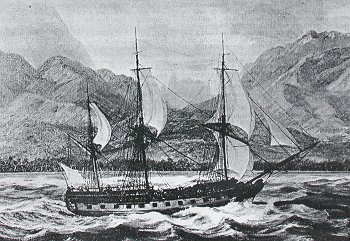
La Boudeuse arriving in Matavai Bay on the north coast of Tahiti in 1767

Ordered by Louis XV, it was the first trip around the world initiated by the French. The discovery and description of Tahiti by Louis Antoine de Bougainville in his trip influenced several Enlightenment philosophers including Jean-Jacques Rousseau (1712–78). The expedition was organised by Louis Antoine de Bougainville and received the support of such prominent figures of the time as Charles de Brosses (1709–77), Comte de Buffon (1707–88), Pierre Louis Moreau de Maupertuis (1698–1759) and Jérôme Lalande (1732–1807).

The expedition aimed to discover new territories available for settlement, to open a new route to reach China, to found new outlets for the French East India Company and, finally, discover acclimatable spices for the Isle de France (now Mauritius).

- Captains: Louis Antoine de Bougainville (1729–1811) Chief of expedition, Nicolas Pierre Duclos-Guyot (Captain of La Boudeuse), François Chenard de la Giraudais (1727–1775) (Captain of L'Étoile)
- Naturalists: Philibert Commerçon (1727–73), Jeanne Baré (1740–1807)
- Astronomer: Pierre-Antoine Véron (1736–70)
- Cartographer: Charles Routier de Romainville (1742–92?)
- Publication: Louis Antoine de Bougainville, Journey Around the World by the Commander of the La Boudeuse and L'Étoile, in 1766, 1767, 1768 and 1769" (Paris, 1771)

==== 1768–71: HMS Endeavour ====
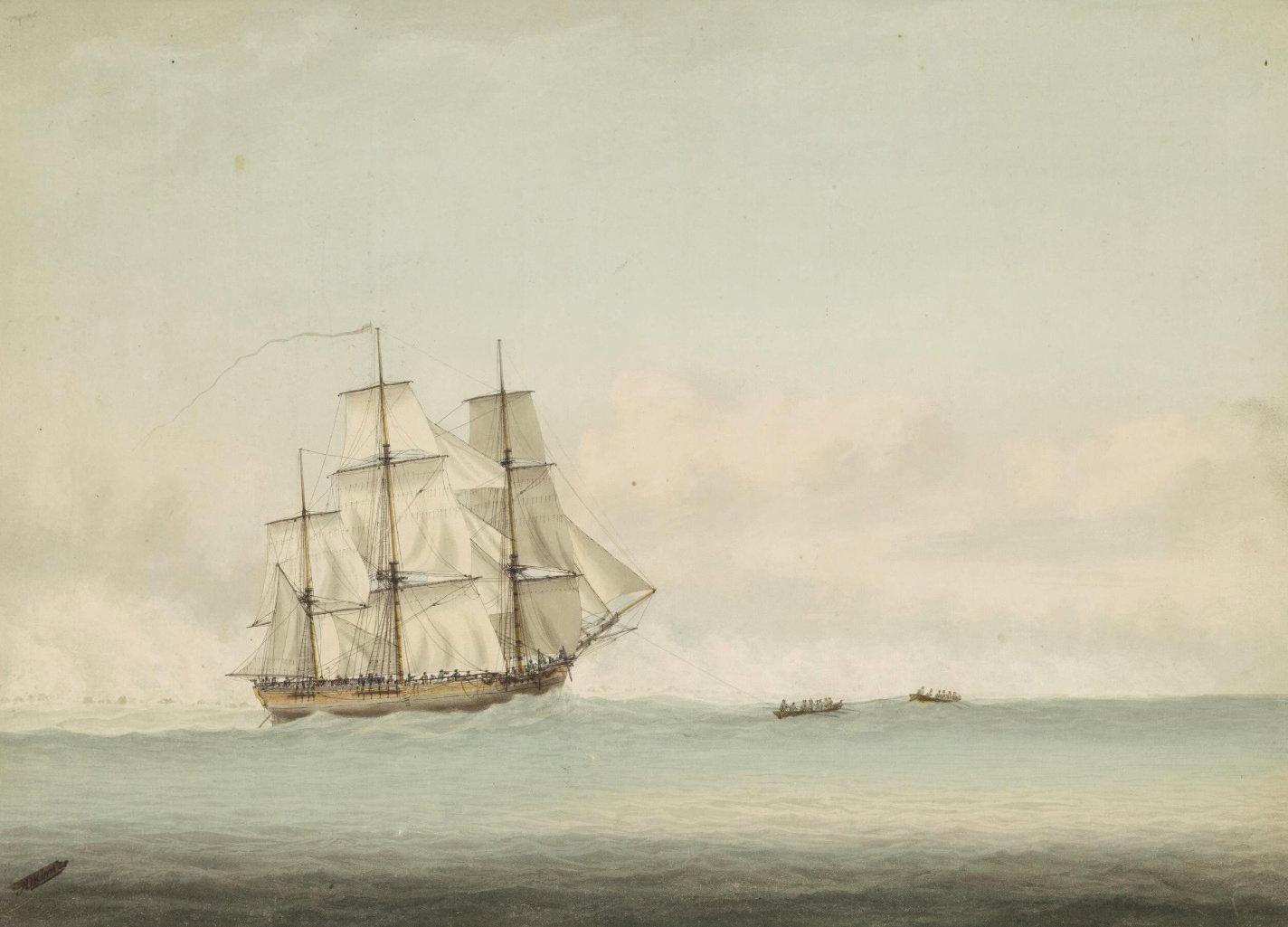
HMS Endeavour off the coast of New Holland (ie. Australia), by Samuel Atkins c. 1794

An expedition to observe the transit of Venus across the Sun (in 1769) that included the discovery of new Islands, Tuamotu and Society Islands, the first circumnavigation of New Zealand and charting of the East coast of New Holland.

- Captain: James Cook (1728–1779)
- Naturalists: Sir Joseph Banks (1743–1820) and Daniel Solander (1733–1782)
- Astronomer: Charles Green (1735–1771)
- Artist: Sydney Parkinson (1745–1771)
- Publications: "A Journal of a voyage round the world [printed], in His Majesty's ship Endeavour, in the years 1768, 1769, 1770, and 1771… to which is added, a Concise vocabulary of the language of Otahitee" (London, 1771). The identity of the authors of this report remains controversial because different authors attribute it to Cook, to Banks, Solander as well as various officers having shared in the voyage. It is translated into French under the title of "Journal of a voyage around the world, 1768, 1769, 1770, 1771; containing the various events of the voyage; with the relationship of the lands newly discovered in the méridional… hemisphere " (Paris, 1772).
  John Hawkesworth (c. 1715 – 1773) is commissioned by the Admiralty to make a synthesis of different shipments under the title "An Account of the Voyages undertaken… for making discoveries in the Southern Hemisphere and performed by Commodore Byrone John Byron, Captain Hallis, Captain Carteret and Captain Cook (from 1702 to 1771) drawn up from the Journals…" (London, three volumes, 1773).

==== 1771–72: Isle de France and Le Nécessaire ====
Expedition to harvest spices for production on Mauritius, to prevent the monopoly of their trade by the Dutch.

- Captains: Chevalier de Coëtivi (Isle of France) and Mr. Cordé (Le Nécessaire)
- Naturalist: Pierre Sonnerat (1748–1814)
- Publication: P. Sonnerat, Trip to New Guinea, which is the description of places, the physical and moral observations, and details about the naturelle… history (Paris, 1776)

==== 1771–72: La Fortune and Le Gros-Ventre ====
Exploration of the southern Indian Ocean and the shipping routes to India.

- Captains: Yves-Joseph de Kerguelen-Trémarec (1734–1797), Louis Aleno de St Aloüarn (1738–1772)

==== 1772: Sir Lawrence ====
An expedition in the brig Sir Lawrence exploring Iceland and the islands along the West coast of Scotland.

- Captain: John Gore (1772–1836)
- Naturalists: Joseph Banks (1743–1820) and Daniel Solander (1733–1782)

==== 1772–75: HMS Resolution and HMS Adventure ====
Cook's second voyage in Resolution and Adventure around the world. He again visited New Zealand, sailed near the Antarctic and discovered many islands in the Pacific. Swedish Sparrman embarked during a stopover at the Cape.

- Captains: James Cook (1728–1779) (Resolution) expedition leader, Charles Clerke and Tobias Furneaux (1735–1781) (Adventure)
- Surgeon-naturalist: William Anderson (1750–1788)
- Naturalists: Johann Reinhold Forster (1729–1798), Georg Forster (1754–1794) and Anders Sparrman (1748–1820)
- Astronomers: William Wales (c. 1734 – 1798), William Bayly (1737–1810)
- Aboard as crew member George Vancouver, also to become a famous Explorer
- Publications: Cook's journals; also the two Forsters each released an account of this journey (Georg A Voyage Round the World (1777), Reinhold Observations Made during a Voyage round the World (1778)).

==== 1773: HMS Racehorse and HMS Carcass ====
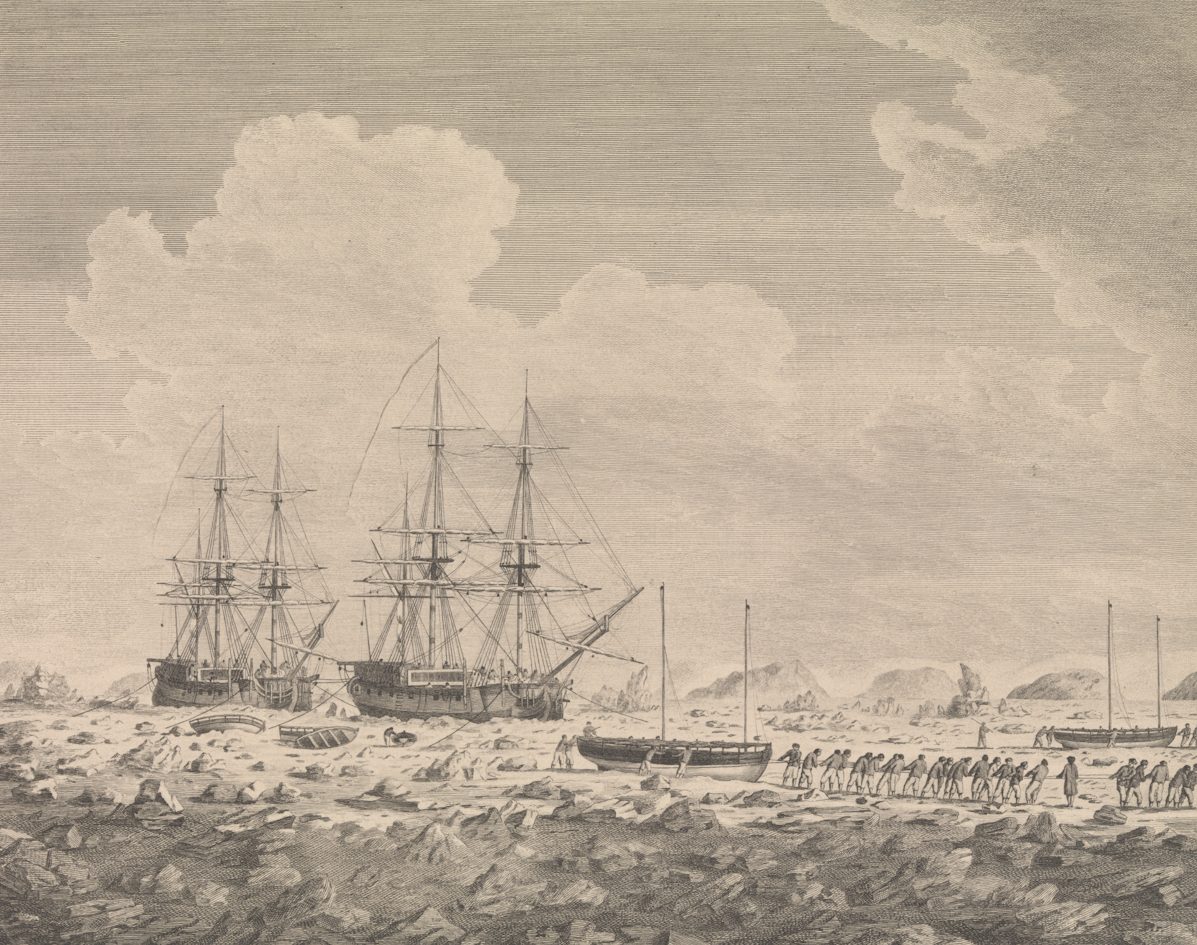
HMS Racehorse and HMS Carcass stuck in the ice on 7 August 1773

A British expedition to explore the Arctic Sea. The two ships reached Svalbard before turning back because of the ice. The teenage Horatio Nelson was a midshipman aboard HMS Carcass.

- Captain: Constantine John Phipps (1744–1792)
- Surgeon-naturalist: Charles Irving, assisted by Olaudah Equiano
- Astronomer: Israel Lyons (1739–1775)
- Publication: C.J. Phipps (1774), A Voyage towards the north pole undertaken ....

==== 1773–74: Le Roland and L'Oiseau ====
Exploration of the southern Indian Ocean.

- Captain: Yves-Joseph de Kerguelen-Trémarec (1734–1797)
- Naturalist: Jean Guillaume Bruguière (1749 or 1750–1798)
- Astronomer: Joseph Lepaute Dagelet

==== 1776–80: HMS Resolution and HMS Discovery ====
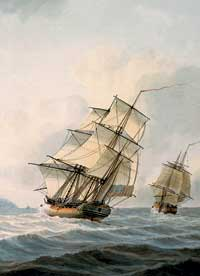
Resolution and Discovery by Samuel Adkin

Cook's Third Voyage to find the Northwest Passage by crossing the Bering Strait. Cook was killed in the Hawaiian archipelago.

- Captains: James Cook (1728–1779) (Resolution) and Charles Clerke (1741–1779) (Discovery)
- Surgeon-naturalists: William Anderson (1750–1788) and William Ellis (1747–1810)
- Astronomer: William Bayly (1737–1810), assistant astronomer Joseph Billings (1758–1806)
- Illustrator: John Webber (1750–1793)
- Crew members: George Vancouver (1757–1798) was to become a celebrated explorer himself and William Bligh (1754–1817) who would later command HMS Bounty, James King (1750–1784) was second lieutenant and shared astronomical duties with Cook on Resolution.

==== 1785–88: Boussole and Astrolabe ====
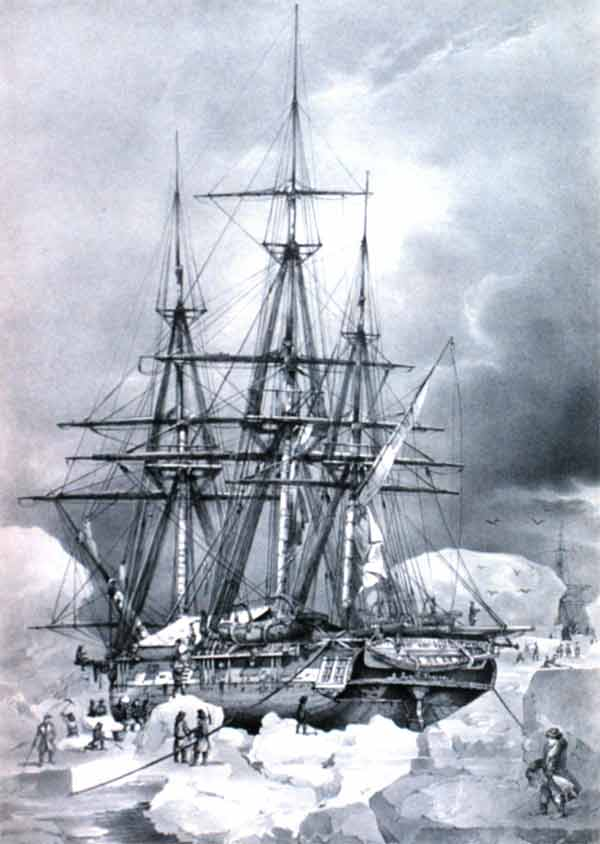
The Astrolabe on an ice floe – 6 February 1838

French King Louis XVI inspired by Cook's voyages mounted his own expedition under the direction of de Lapérouse. Cook's anti-scorbutic remedies to eradicate scurvy were applied successfully. Lamanon and twelve other members of the expedition were massacred by natives at Vanuatu where they were looking for water. The two ships disappeared in the Solomon Islands, at Vanikoro, during a violent storm.

- Captain: Jean-François de Galaup, comte de Lapérouse (1741–1788) (on the Boussole) and Paul Antoine Fleuriot de Langle (1744–1787) (on the Astrolabe)
- Chief Engineer: Paul Mérault Monneron (1748–1788)
- Geologist: Robert de Lamanon (1752–1787)
- Artists: the uncle and nephew Prevost, Duché De Vancy
- Naturalists: Jean-André Mongez (1751 – c. 1788)
- Interpreter of Russian: Barthélemy de Lesseps (1766–1834) landed at Petropavlovsk, and in charge of bringing to France the log, maps and drawings of the trip.

==== 1785–88: King George ====
Global circumnavigation.

- Captain: Nathaniel Portlock

==== 1785–94: Slava Rossii ====
A Russian expedition commanded by the British Captain Joseph Billings, astronomer on Cook's third voyage. This expedition lasted more than ten years attempting, unsuccessfully, to find the Northwest Passage that had remained undiscovered after Cook's explorations.

- Captain: Joseph Billings (c. 1758 – 1806)
- Naturalists: Carl Heinrich Merck and Carl Krebs
- Surgeons-naturalists: Michael Robeck and Peter Allegretti
- Cartographer: Gavriil Sarytchev
- Publications: J. Billings, An Account of a Geographical and Astronomical expedition to the Northern parts of Russia. (1802), translated into French the same year under the title of Voyage made by order of Empress Catherine II Russia, in the North of the Asian Russian the icy sea, in the sea on the coasts of America, from 1785 until 1794, by commodore Billings and Anadyr (Paris, 1802); Peter Simon Pallas (1741–1811), Zoographia Rosso – Asiatica (1811), where he described the species discovered by this expedition.

==== 1790–91: La Solide ====
The Solide expedition was the second successful circumnavigation by the French, after that by Bougainville. It occurred from 1790 to 1792 but remains little known due to its mostly commercial aims in the fur trade between the northwest American coast and China.

- Captain: Étienne Marchand (1755–1793)

==== 1789–94: Descubierta and Atrevida ====
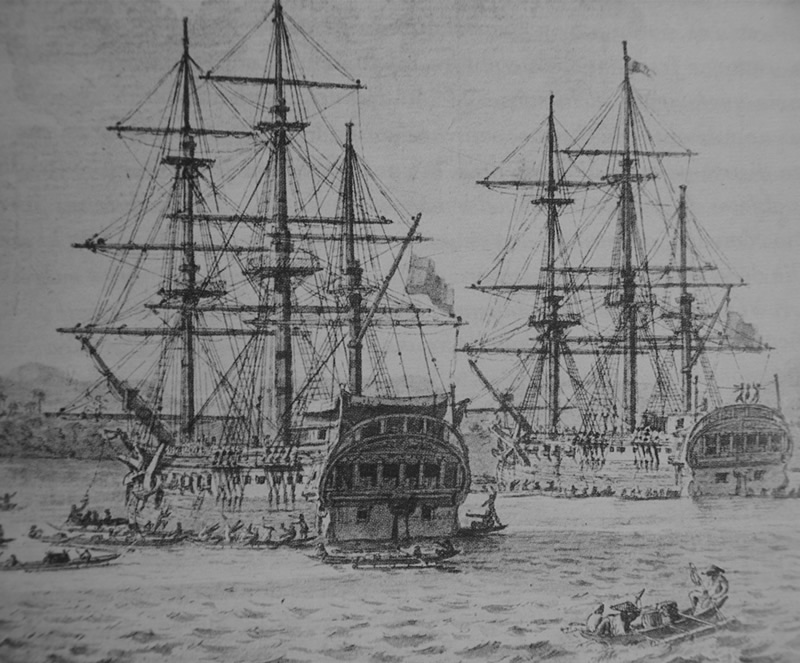
Drawing of the Spanish corvettes Descubierta and Atrevida

The Spanish Malaspina Expedition explored the coasts of Spanish possessions in America and Alaska, always looking for the Northwest Passage. More than 70 crates of natural history specimens were sent to Madrid. On return Captain Malaspina was forced into exile because of his ideas, suggesting, among other things, that Spain abandon the military domination of its colonies in favour of a Federation. The scientific journal of the trip was lost but recovered in 1885.

- Captains: Alessandro Malaspina (1754–1810) (Descubierta) and José de Bustamante y Guerra (1759–1825) (Atrevida)
- Naturalists: Antonio Pineda (1751–1792), Thaddäus Haenke (1761–1817), Luis Née (c. 1789 – 1794) and Tomas de Suria
- Artist: José del Pozo and José Guío
- Publication: Pedro de Novo y Colson (1846–1931), Viaje político-científico alrededor del mundo: por las corbetas Descubierta y Atrevida al mando los capitanes navío d. Alejandro Malaspina y Don José de Bustamante y Guerra, desde 1789 á 1794. (Madrid, 1885).

==== 1791–94: La Recherche and L'Espérance ====
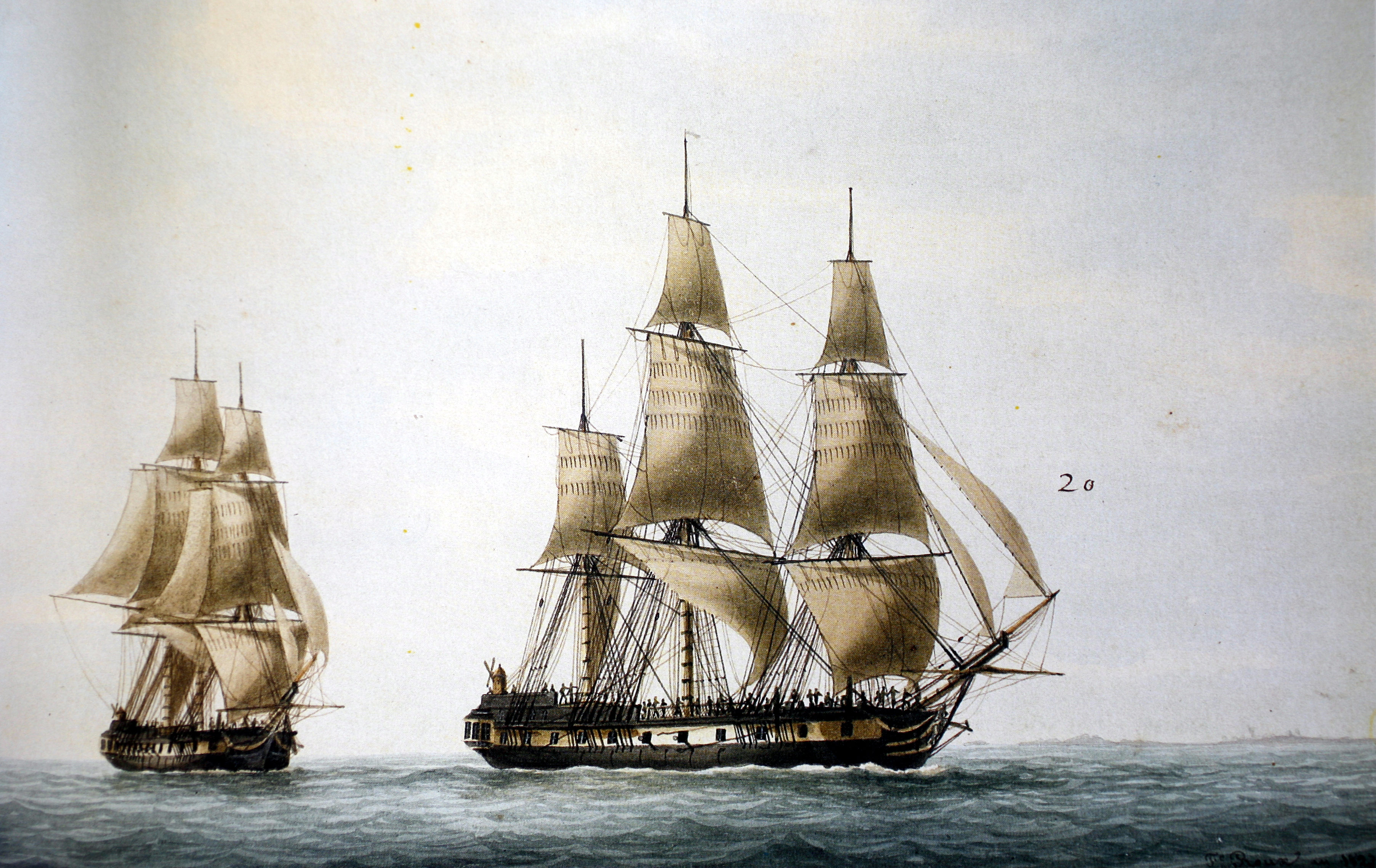
The frigates Recherche and Espérance

An expedition to find the two vessels commanded by Jean-François de La Pérouse (1741–1788), and of which there was no news after they had left Port Jackson heading for southern Tasmania and southern Australia. The two captains of the search expedition both perished en route: Captain Kermadec died in May 1793 of tuberculosis and Captain d'Entrecasteaux died of scurvy in July of the same year. The expedition was headed by a royalist, and heard of The Terror in France when putting into the Dutch colonies. The crew was arrested and collections of natural history confiscated and offered by the Dutch to the British. These were however, on the express request of the scientist Joseph Banks (1743–1820), returned to France.

- Captains: Antoine Bruni d'Entrecasteaux (1737–1793) (Recherche) and Jean-Michel de Kermadec (1748–1793) (Espérance)
- Naturalists: Jacques-Julien de Labillardière (1755–1834), Claude Riche (1762–1798), Jean Blavier (1764–1828), the father Louis Ventenat (1765–1794) and Louis Deschamps (1765–1842)
- Hydrographer: Charles-François Beautemps-Beaupré (1766–1854)
- Gardener: Félix Delahaye (1767–1829)
- Artist: Piron (?–1796)
- Publication: J.H. La Billardière, Relation of the voyage for the Perugia, made by order of the constituent Assembly during the years 1791, 1792 and during the first and second years of the Republic Françoise (Paris, 1799); Elizabeth Rossel, Voyage of Entrecasteaux, sent for Lapérouse, 2 vols, 1809.

==== 1791–93: HMS Providence ====
The Royal Society of Arts, Manufactures and Commerce offered a reward of fifty pounds for living breadfruit plants. Bligh completed this in Providence, his second mission to collect breadfruit plants and other botanical specimens from the Pacific. These he transported to the West Indies, specimens being given to the Royal Botanic Gardens in Saint Vincent. This expedition was a success, returning to the Royal Botanic Gardens Kew with 1,283 plants including varieties of apple, pear, oranges and mangoes. In addition to these specimens, the expedition accomplished many observations and cartographic surveys in the South Seas.

- Captain: William Bligh (1754–1817)
- Surgeon-naturalist: Thomas Dancer (c. 1750 – 1811)

==== 1791–95: HMS Discovery and HMS Chatham ====
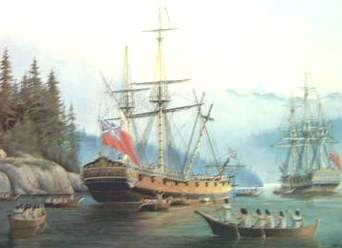
Discovery in 1789

A mission to the South Seas and Pacific Northwest coast of America. In 1791, Discovery left England with Chatham. Both ships anchored at Cape Town before exploring the south coast of Australia. In King George Sound, the Discovery's naturalist and surgeon Archibald Menzies collected various plant species including Banksia grandis, the first recording of the genus Banksia from Western Australia. The two ships sailed to Hawaiʻi where Vancouver named Kamehameha I. Chatham and Discovery then sailed on to the Northwest Pacific. Over the course of the next four years, Vancouver surveyed the northern Pacific Ocean coast in Discovery wintering in Spanish California or Hawaiʻi. Discovery's primary mission was to exert British sovereignty over this part of the Northwest Coast following the hand-over of the Spanish Fort San Miguel at Nootka Sound, although exploration in co-operation with the Spanish was seen as an important secondary objective. Exploration work was successful as relations with the Spanish went well; resupply in California was especially helpful. Vancouver and the Spanish commandant Juan Francisco de la Bodega y Quadra were on such good terms that the original name of Vancouver Island was actually Quadra and Vancouver's Island.

- Captains: George Vancouver (1757–1798) (Discovery) and William Robert Broughton (1763–1822) (Chatham)
- Naturalist: Archibald Menzies (1754–1842)
- Physician-naturalist: Alexander Cranstoun

==== 1800–04: Le Géographe and Naturaliste ====
This expedition was organised to establish a permanent colonial presence in the South Seas before the British, concentrating on the mapping of the coast of the Australia and New Guinea. Nicolas Baudin died in Mauritius in 1803, another naturalist on the island of Timor, two other naturalists chose to stay on the island and two astronomers died of dysentery. Péron, assisted by his friend Lesueur, managed to gather a vast zoological collection. Naturaliste returned to France in 1803 with a part of the collections. Captain Baudin bought a schooner, the Casuarina, at the British settlement of Port Jackson in Australia. Baudin was replaced by Pierre Bernard Milius (1773–1829).

- Commanders: Nicolas Baudin (1754–1803) (Le Géographe) and Jacques Hamelin (1768–1839) (Le Naturaliste).
- Physician, surgeon (first doctor in the Navy) and biologist: Pierre François Keraudren (1769–1858) (Le Géographe).
- Naturalists: Jean Baptiste Leschenault de la Tour (1773–1826), René Maugé Cely, Stanislas Levillain (1774–1801), François Péron (1775–1810), Jean-Baptiste Bory de Saint-Vincent (1778–1846) (left the expedition to Mauritius), Désiré Dumont, André Michaux (1746–1803)
- Artist: Charles-Alexandre Lesueur (1778–1846) assisted by Nicolas-Martin Petit (1777–1804)
- Astronomers: Pierre-François Bernier (1779–1803) and Frédéric de Bissy (1768–1803)
- Cartographer: Charles-Pierre Boullanger
- Geographer: Pierre Faure (1777–1855)
- Mineralogist: Louis Depuch, Joseph Charles Bailly
- Publications: F. Péron, Voyage of discovery to the southern lands (three volumes, Paris, 1807–1816); many species of birds are described by Louis Pierre Vieillot (1748–1831) in the New Dictionary of Natural History (1816–1819).

==== 1801–03: HMS Investigator ====
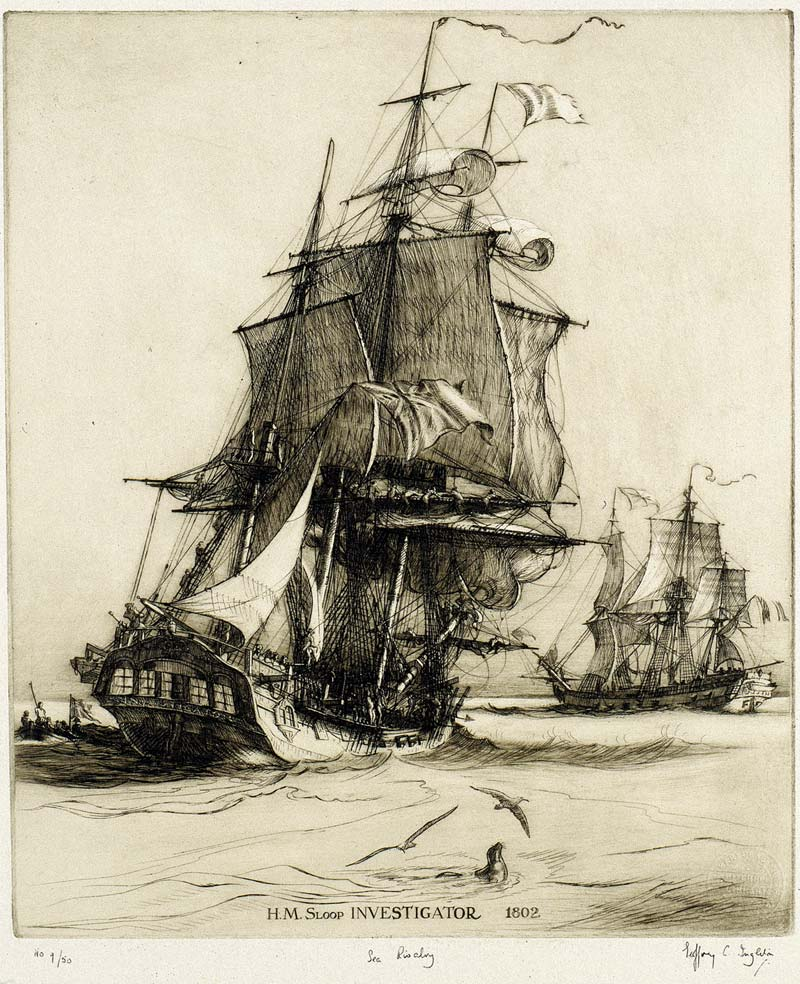
A 20th-century drawing of Investigator

The first circumnavigation of Australia. The work of scientific observation was interrupted due to damage and many specimens transferred to HMS Porpoise were lost when it sank. The observations of Brown on the flora of this continent were the most extensive at this time.

- Captain: Matthew Flinders (1774–1814).
- Naturalist: Robert Brown (1773–1858)
- Physician-naturalist: Hugh Bell
- Mineralogist: John Allen
- Astronomer: John Crosley
- Artists: Ferdinand Bauer (1760–1826) and William Westall (1781–1850)
- Publication: M. Flinders, A Voyage to Terra Australis, undertaken for the purpose of completing the discovery of that vast country and prosecuted in the years 1801, 1802 and 1803 ... (two volumes, 1814).

==== 1803–06: Nadezhda and Neva ====
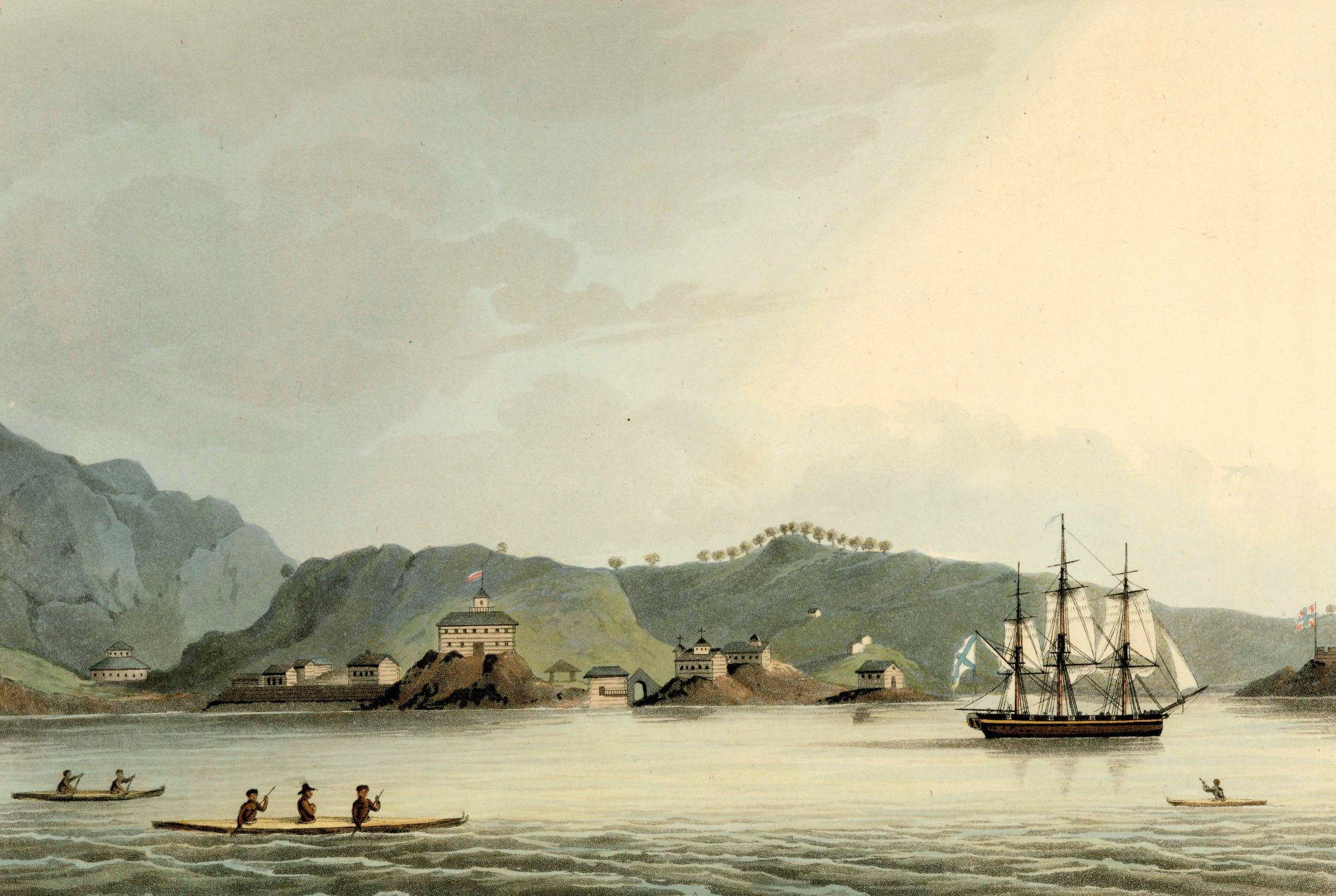
The Russian sloop Neva visits Kodiak in Alaska

The first Russian circumnavigation of the world was intended to establish a link with Russian possessions in America, the transport of goods at that time being via Siberia (a journey lasting about two years). The second objective, which was not achieved, was to establish trade and diplomatic links with Japan. This expedition took place during the rule of emperor Alexander I (1777–1825).

Nadezhda and Neva explored the Aleutian Islands, Sakhalin and discovered the mouth of the Love River. They also visited the Marquesas Islands and Hawaii. Baron von Langsdorff left the expedition in 1805 to explore the Interior of Alaska and California. Thirteen cases of natural history specimens were shipped to the St. Petersburg Academy of Sciences.

- Captains: Adam Johann von Krusenstern (1770–1846) (Nadezhda) and Yuri Fyodorovich Lisianski (Neva)
- Naturalist: Georg Heinrich von Langsdorff (1774–1852)
- Physician-naturalist: Wilhelm Gottlieb Tilesius von Tilenau (1769–1857)
- Publication: G. H. von Langsdorff, Bemerkungen auf einer Reise um die Welt in den Jahren 1803 bis 1807, von G. h. von Langsdorff, ... (Frankfurt am Main, two volumes, 1812).

==== 1815–18: Rurik ====
A Russian expedition funded by the Chancellor of Russia, count Nikolai P. Romanzof to investigate the Northeast Passage in the Bering Sea. The coast of Alaska was studied and the South Pacific, also the cartography of 36 islands including the Marshall Islands. Also natural history collections made.

- Captain: Otto von Kotzebue (1787–1846)
- Naturalist: Adelbert von Chamisso (1781–1838)
- Physician-naturalist: Johann Friedrich von Eschscholtz (1793–1831)
- Publication: J.F. Eschscholtz, Entdeckungs – Reise in die Süd – See und nach der Berings – Strasse zur Erforschung einer nordöstlichen Durchfahrt, unternommen in den Jahren 1815, 1816, 1817 1818 und, auf Kosten… a… Grafen Rumanzoff, auf dem Schiffe ″Rurick″, unter dem Befehle of the Lieutenants… Otto von Kotzebue… (three volumes, Weimer, 1821).

==== 1817–20: L'Uranie and La Physicienne ====
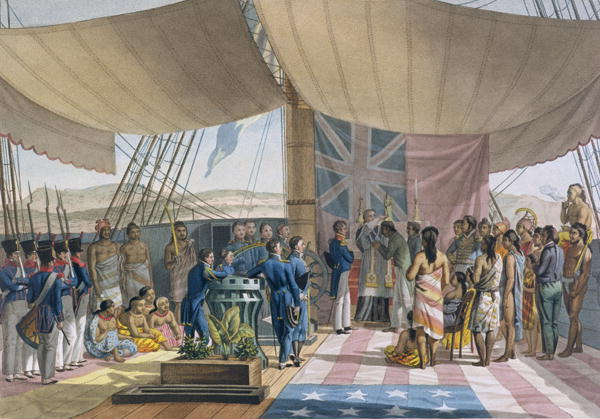
Baptism of Hawaiians on the Uranie in 1819

A French expedition exploring Western Australia and islands of Timor, Molucca, Samoa and Hawaii. L'Uranie visited Rio de Janeiro to take a series of pendulum measurements as well as other observations, not only in geography and ethnology, but in astronomy, terrestrial magnetism, and meteorology, and for the collection of specimens in natural history.

- Commander: Commander Louis Claude de Saulces Freycinet (1779–1842)
- Second: Louis Isidore Duperrey (1786–1865)
- Physician-naturalist: Joseph Paul Gaimard (1796–1858) and Jean René Constant Quoy (1790–1869)
- Botanist: Charles Gaudichaud-Beaupré (1789–1854)
- Illustrator: Jacques Arago (1790–1855), Adrien Taunay the Younger (1803–1828)
- Publication: de Freycinet, L. Voyage autour du Monde...exécuté sur les corvettes de L. M. "L'Uranie" et "La Physicienne," pendant les années 1817, 1818, 1819 et 1820. Paris. pp. 192–401. J. Arago, Drive around the world during the years 1817, 1818, 1819 and 1820, on the corvettes of the King the Urania and physicist, commissioned by Mr. Freycinet, by Js. Arago, designer of the expedition (Paris, 2 volumes, 1822).

==== 1819–21: Le Rhône and La Durance ====
One of the missions of this expedition was to take plants from Java and the Philippines to French Guiana. The botanist Samuel Perrottet (1793–1870) settled in Guyana to investigate the acclimatisation of plants transplanted from Asia. La Durance returned to France in 1820, Le Rhône the following year.

- Captain: Pierre Henri Philibert (1774–?)
- Botanist: George Samuel Perrottet (1793–1870)

==== 1822–25: La Coquille ====
Louis Isidore Duperrey commanded the expedition in La Coquille with Jules Dumont d'Urville as second in command. The naturalists appointed to the expedition were the surgeon, pharmacist and zoologist René Primevère Lesson and surgeon-major Prosper Garnot. Doctor Garnot had a severe attack of dysentery and was sent back on the Castle Forbes with some of the specimens collected in South America and the Pacific. The specimens were lost when the ship was wrecked off the Cape of Good Hope in July 1824. Garnot and Lesson wrote the zoological section of the voyage's report.

- Commander: lieutenant Louis Isidore Duperrey (1786–1865)
- Second: lieutenant Jules Dumont d'Urville, botanist (1790–1842)
- Physician-naturalist: the surgeon, pharmacist and zoologist René Primevère Lesson (1794–1849) and surgeon-major Prosper Garnot (1794–1838)
- Astronomer: Charles Hector Jacquinot (1796–1879)
- Illustrators: Jules Louis Lejeune (1804–1851), Jacques Arago (1790–1855)
- Hydrographer: Victor Charles Lottin (1795–1858)
- Publications: Lesson and Garnot, Voyage autour du monde exécuté par ordre du roi sur la corvette La Coquille (1828–32)/Journey around the world on the corvette La Coquille (Paris, six volumes, 1826–1830).

==== 1823–26: Predpriyatiye ====
An expedition of two ships of war, the main object of which was to take reinforcements to Kamchatka. There was, however, a staff of scientists on board the Russian sailing sloop Predpriyatiye (Russian: "Enterprise"), who collected much valuable information and material on geography, ethnography and natural history. The expedition, proceeding by Cape Horn, visited the Radak and Society Islands, and reached Petropavlovsk in July 1824. Many positions along the coast were mapped more accurately, the Navigator islands visited, and several discoveries made. The expedition returned by the Marianas, Philippines, New Caledonia and the Hawaiian Islands, reaching Kronstadt on 10 July 1826.

- Captain: Otto von Kotzebue (1787–1846)
- Physician-naturalist: Johann Friedrich von Eschscholtz (1793–1831) and Dr. Lenz
- Publication: O. von Kotzebue, Reise um die Welt in den Jahren 1823, 24, 25 und 26, von Otto von Kotzebue, ... (Weimer, 1830).

==== 1824–25: HMS Blonde ====
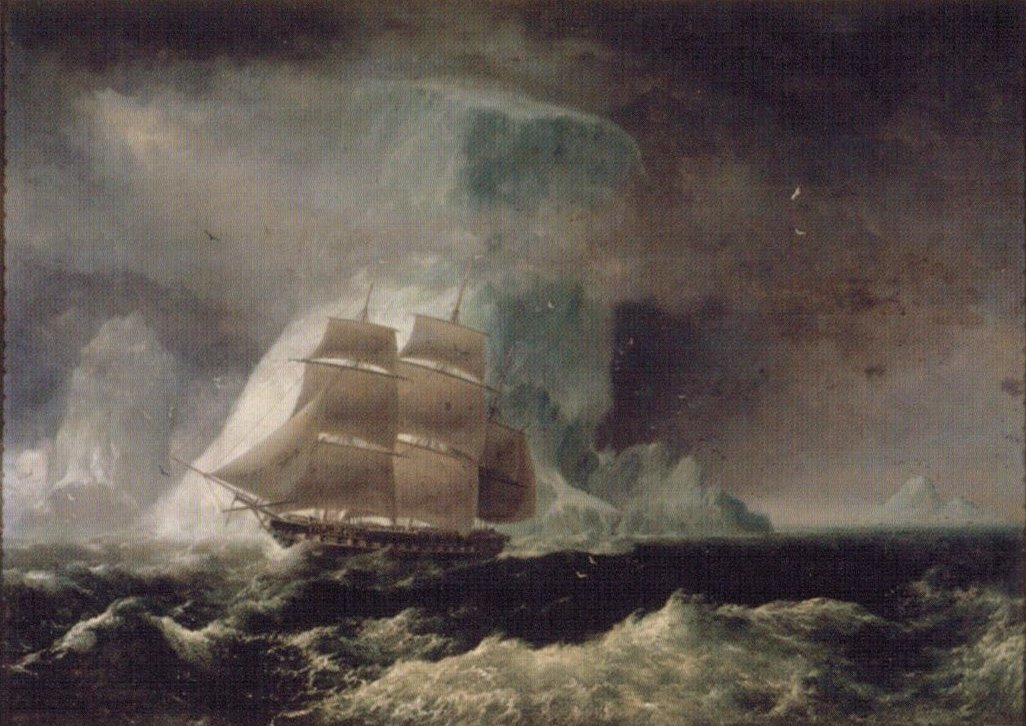
HMS Blonde, by Robert Dampier, 1825

In 1824 Byron was chosen to accompany homewards the bodies of Hawaiian monarchs Liholiho (known as King Kamehameha II) and Queen Kamāmalu, who had died of measles during a state visit to England. He sailed in HMS Blonde in September 1824, accompanied by several naturalists and, amongst others, his lieutenant, Edward Belcher. He toured the islands and made observations. With the consent of Christian missionaries to the islands, he also removed wooden carvings and other artifacts of the chiefs of ancient Hawaii from the temple ruins of Puʻuhonua O Hōnaunau. On his return journey in 1825, Lord Byron discovered and charted Malden Island, which he named after his surveying officer, Mauke; and Starbuck Island. Starbuck was named in honour of Captain Valentine Starbuck, an American whaler who had sighted the island while carrying the Hawaiian royal couple to England in 1823–1824, but which had probably been previously sighted by his cousin and fellow-whaler Captain Obed Starbuck in 1823.

- Captain: George Anson Byron (1789–1868)
- Naturalists: Andrew Bloxam (1801–1878) and James Macrae
- Published by: G.A. Byron, Voyage of H.M.S. Blonde to the Sandwich Islands, in the years 1824–1825. The Right Hon. captain. Lord Byron order. (London, 1826).

==== 1824–26: Le Thétis and L'Espérance ====
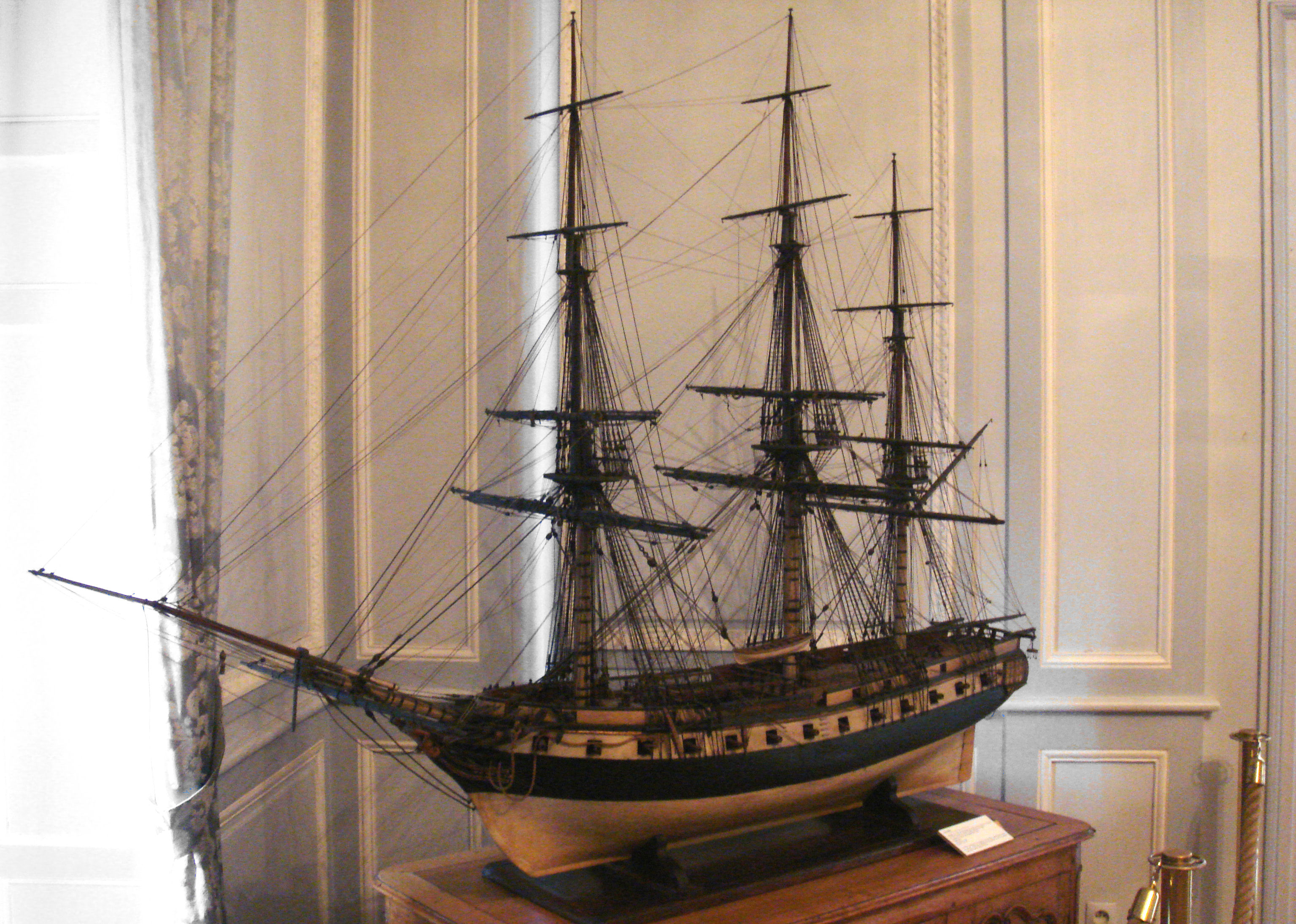
1813 model of the frigate Thétis in the Musée National de la Marine (Rochefort).

A French mission to establish diplomatic relations with Indochina and make geographical observations. On 12 January 1825, Hyacinthe de Bougainville led an embassy to Vietnam with Captain Courson de la Ville-Hélio, arriving in Da Nang, with the warships Thétis and L'Espérance. Although they had a 28 January 1824 letter from Louis XVIII, the ambassadors could not obtain an audience with Minh Mạng.

- Captains: Hyacinthe de Bougainville (1781–1846) (Le Thétis) and Paul de Nourquer du Camper (L'Espérance)
- Surgeon-naturalist: François Louis Busseuil (1791–1835)

==== 1825–28: HMS Blossom ====
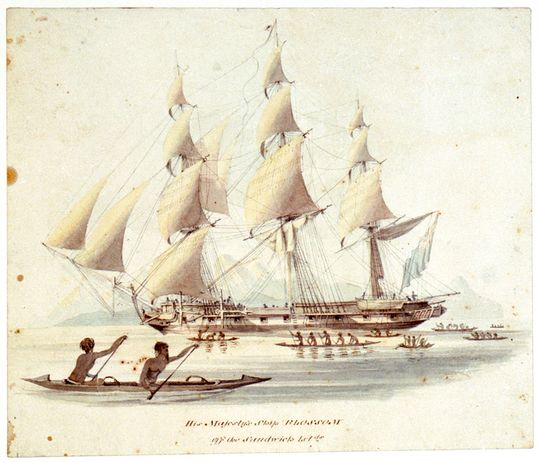
HMS Blossom off the Sandwich Islands, now the Hawaiian Islands

A British expedition to the Bering Sea attempting a rendezvous with the expedition of Sir John Franklin (1786–1847) at the mouth of the Mackenzie River. Blossom reached as far north as Point Barrow, Alaska, the furthest point into the Arctic any non-Inuit had been at the time, but was unable to join the Franklin expedition. With Lay ill it was Beechey and Collie that performed most of the specimen collection but many could not be preserved.

- Captain: Frederick William Beechey (1796–1856)
- Physician-naturalist: Alexander Collie (1793–1835)
- Naturalist: George Tradescant Lay (1800?–1854)
- Publication: F.W. Beechey, Narrative of a Voyage to the Pacific and Behring's Strait" (1831), "The Zoology of Captain Beechey's voyage to the Pacific and Behring's Strait. (1839).

==== 1825–30: HMS Adventure and HMS Beagle ====
The mission was the hydrographic survey of Patagonia and Tierra del Fuego, under the overall command of the surveyor Commander Phillip Parker King, in HMS Adventure.

In the desolate waters of Tierra del Fuego Stokes, the captain of HMS Beagle, became depressed and shot himself on 2 August 1828 dying a few days later. Parker King replaced Stokes with Lieutenant W.G. Skyring as commander of the ship, and both ships sailed to Montevideo. After the ships arrived at Rio de Janeiro for repairs and provisioning, Rear Admiral Sir Robert Otway, the Commander-in-chief of the South American station, gave command of Beagle to his aide, Lieutenant Robert FitzRoy. Fuegians were taken back with them when the Beagle returned. During this survey, the Beagle Channel was identified and named after the ship.

- Captain: Philip Parker King (1793–1856) (Adventure) and Pringle Stokes (?–1828) (Beagle)
- Naturalist: James Anderson (1797–1842)
- Publication: P.P. King, Narrative of the first surveying voyage of H. M. ships ″Adventure″ and ″Beagle″, between the years 1826 and 1836, describing their examination of the Southern shores of South-America and the ″Beagle's″ circumnavigation of the world ... Vol. i. [containing the proceedings of the first expedition, 1826–1830 under the command of captain P. Parker King "(London, 1839).]

==== 1826–29: L'Astrolabe ====
This mission, led by Dumont d'Urville, searched for the two vessels of La Pérouse (1741–1788). The coasts of Australia, of New Zealand, of Fiji and the Loyalty Islands were explored. Dumont d'Urville renamed La Coquille as L'Astrolabe as a tribute to the ship of La Pérouse.

- Captain: Jules Dumont d'Urville (1790–1842)
- Physician-naturalist: Joseph Paul Gaimard (1796–1858) and Jean René Constant Quoy (1790–1869)
- Pharmacy-botanist: René Primevère Lesson (1805–1888)
- Publications: J. Dumont d'Urville, Voyage of the Astrolabe. (14 volumes, 1830–1835).

==== 1826–29: Senyavin and Moller ====
A Russian circumnavigation on the ship Senyavin, sailing from Kronstadt and rounding Cape Horn, accompanied by Captain Mikhail Nikolaievich Staniukovich in command of the sloop Moller. During the voyage Litke and his team described the western coastline of the Bering Sea, the Bonin Islands off Japan, and the Carolines, and discovered 12 new islands. The expedition strengthened the Russian presence near Alaska. A large collection of natural history specimens was made including 1,000 new species of insects, fish, birds and other animals, and 2,500 plant specimens including algae and minerals.

- Captain: Fyodor Litke (1797–1882)
- Botanist-naturalist: Karl Heinrich Mertens (1796–1830)
- Naturalist: Heinrich von Kittlitz (1799–1874)
- Mineralogist: Alexander Philipov Postels (1801–1871)
- Published by: F. Litke, Trip around the world (1835–1836).

==== 1827–28: La Chevrette ====
The first French expedition to map the coast of India.

- Captain: Theodore Fabré (1795–1830)
- Surgeon-naturalist: Auguste Adolphe Marc Reynaud (1804–?)

==== 1828: Ms. Korvet Triton ====
Dutch exploration of New Guinea.

- The corvette Triton
- The brig Iris
  - Expedition leader: Dr. H.C. Macklot
  - Captain of Triton: J.J. Steenboom

==== 1829: La Cybèle ====
Scientific exploration was placed under the direction of Jean-Baptiste Bory de Saint-Vincent (1778–1846).

- Captain: Marie Antoine Chevalier de Robillard (1788–1837)
- Zoologists: Gaspard Auguste Brullé (1809–1873) and Sextius Delaunay
- Botanist: Jean-Marie Despréaux (1794–1843)
- Geologist: Pierre Théodore Virlet D'Aoust (1800–1894)
- Artist: Prosper Baccuet (1798–1854)

==== 1829–32: La Favorite ====
As British, American and Dutch voyages consolidated their interest in Australia, Hawaii and New Guinea, the French government sought to secure the religious freedoms and rights of French residents in the South Pacific. The expedition passed the Cape of Good Hope, stopping at Pondicherry and Madras, and then exploring the coast of Cochinchina and Tonkin, stopping in the Philippines, Australia, Tasmania and New Zealand. The expedition was considered a great success, many hydrological observations were completed and natural history collections assembled.

- Captain: Cyrille Pierre Théodore Laplace (1793–1875)
- Naturalist: Joseph Fortuné Théodore Eydoux (1802–1841)
- Publication: C.P.T. Laplace, Journey around the world by the India and China seas, running on the corvette of the State the Favorite during the 1830s, 1831 and 1832 under the command of Mr Laplace captain of frégatte. Published by order of Mr. Vice-Admiral comte Rigny Minister of marine and colonies. (seven volumes including two atlas, Paris, 1833–1839).

==== 1831–36: HMS Beagle ====
A world circumnavigation to make a hydrographic survey of the coast of Patagonia, Tierra del Fuego, Chile and Peru, and establish accurate longitude measurements. Charles Darwin paid his own way as a naturalist/companion to the captain, and found the voyage a stimulus both to his understanding as a geologist and to the formulation of his Theory of Evolution.

- Captain: Robert FitzRoy (1805–1865)
- Physician-naturalist: Robert McCormick (1800–1890) until April 1832, followed by Benjamin Bynoe (1803–1865)
- Artist: Augustus Earle, replaced by Conrad Martens
- Naturalist (supernumerary passenger): Charles Darwin (1809–1882)
- Publications: C. Darwin (editor), Zoology of the Voyage of H.M.S. Beagle. (five volumes, 1838–1843),
  R. FitzRoy (editor), Narrative of the surveying voyages of His Majesty's Ships Adventure and Beagle between the years 1826 and 1836, describing their examination of the southern shores of South America, and the Beagle's circumnavigation of the globe. (volume 2 and appendix by FitzRoy, Proceedings of the second expedition, 1831–36, under the command of Captain Robert Fitz-Roy, R.N. (1839), volume 3 by C. Darwin Journal and Remarks, (1839).)
  C. Darwin, The Geology of the Voyage of The Beagle (three volumes, The Structure and Distribution of Coral Reefs (1842), Geological Observations on the Volcanic Islands (1844), Geological Observations on South America (1846).)

==== 1835 and 1836: La Recherche ====
Two French expeditions to the coasts of Iceland and Greenland in an attempt to trace the Bordelaise commanded by Jules de Blosseville (1802–1833), which had been missing since 1833.

- Captain François Thomas Tréhouart (1798–1873)
- Physician-naturalist: Joseph Paul Gaimard (1796–1858) assisted by Elie Jean-François Le Guillou (1806–1894) (first voyage) and by Charles René Augustin Léclancher (1804–1857) (second voyage), Louis Eugène Robert

==== 1836–39: Vénus ====
A French expedition (circumnavigation) in the frigate Vénus to assess the economic viability of whaling in the North Pacific. Notably, Captain Abel Aubert du Petit-Thouars was responsible for safeguarding French Catholics in the Pacific.

- Captain: Abel Aubert du Petit-Thouars (1793–1864)
- Engineer hydrographer: Urbain Dortet de Tessan (1804–1879)
- Physician-naturalist: Adolphe Simon Neboux (1806–1844)
- Surgeon: Charles René Augustin Léclancher (1804–1857)
- Publication: A.A. Petit-Thouars, Travel around the world on the frigate Venus. (eleven volumes, 1840–1864).

==== 1836–37: La Bonite ====
A global circumnavigation sailing the coast of South America, back along the West Coast to California, across the Pacific, reaching Manila, China, India, the Isla Borbón and returning to France. More than 1,000 new plant species were collected and many geographical and meteorological observations were made.

- Captain: Auguste-Nicolas Vaillant (1793–1858)
- Physician-naturalist: Joseph Fortuné Théodore Eydoux (1803–1841) and Louis François Auguste Souleyet (1811–1852)
- Hydrographer: Benoît Darondeau (1805–1869)
- Pharmacy-botanist: Charles Gaudichaud-Beaupré (1789–1854)
- Publication: A. N. Vaillant, Trip around the world executed during the years 1836 and 1837 on the corvette Bonito ... (eleven volumes, Paris, 1841–1852).

==== 1836–42: HMS Sulphur ====
Exploration of the Pacific coast of America and interior of Nicaragua and El Salvador. Sulphur participated in the First Opium War between 1840 and 1841 and was later used to survey the harbour of Hong Kong in 1841, returning to England in 1842.

- Captain: Edward Belcher (1799–1877)
- Physician-naturalist: Richard Brinsley Hinds (1811–1846)
- Publications: E. Belcher, Narrative of a Voyage Round the World in HMS Sulphur. (two volumes, 1843) (Volume 1, Volume 2); R.B. Hinds (editor), "The Zoology of the Voyage of HMS Sulphur" (two volumes, 1843–1844).

==== 1837–40: L'Astrolabe and La Zélée ====
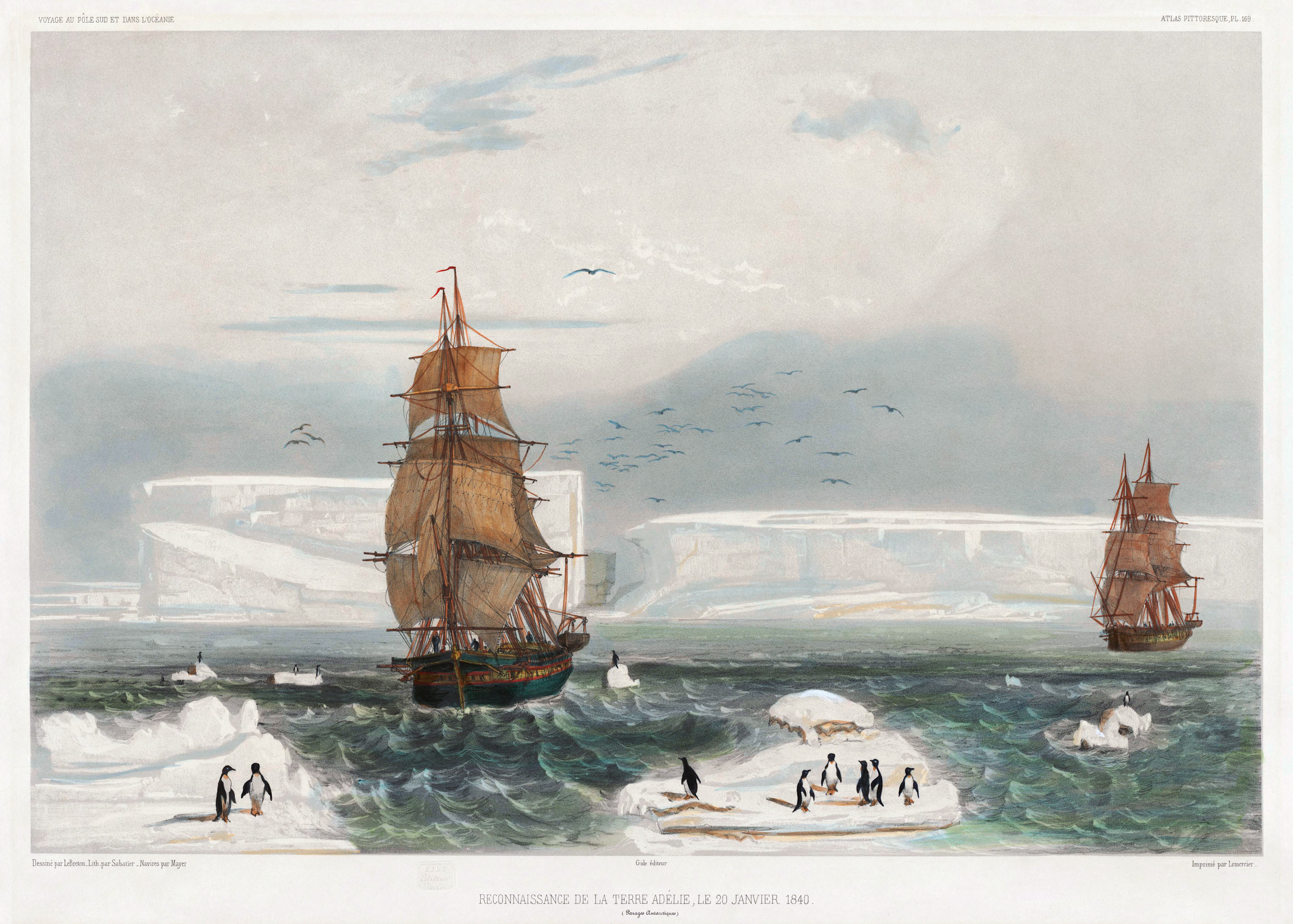
L'Astrolabe and La Zélée in 1840

The second voyage of L'Astrolabe, this time accompanied by La Zélée, sailed on 7 September 1837 and at the end of November, the ships reached the Strait of Magellan. Dumont thought there was sufficient time to explore the strait for three weeks, taking into account the precise maps drawn by Phillip Parker King between 1826 and 1830, before heading south again but two weeks after seeing their first iceberg, the ships were encased in pack ice for a while. After reaching the South Orkney Islands, the expedition headed directly to the South Shetland Islands and the Bransfield Strait. Then located some land which was named Terre de Louis-Philippe (now called Graham Land), the Joinville Island group and Rosamel Island (now called Andersson Island). In poor shape the two ships headed for Talcahuano in Chile. Turning south they led for the first time some experiments to determine the approximate position of the South Magnetic Pole, discovered the Terre Adélie on 20 January 1840, and landed two days later on an islet of the Géologie Archipelago (66°36′19″S 140°4′0″E) 4 km from the mainland to take mineral and animal samples.

- Captains: Jules Dumont d'Urville (1790–1842) (L'Astrolabe), Charles Hector Jacquinot (1796–1879) (La Zélée)
- Physician-naturalist: on "The Astrolabe", Jacques Bernard Hombron (1798–1852) surgeon-major of 2nd class and Louis Le Breton (1818–1866) surgeon 3rd class and "La Zélée" Honoré Jacquinot (1815–1887) 3rd class surgeon, Elie Jean François Le Guillou (1806 – after 1860) surgeon, 3rd class
- Preparer-naturalist, phrenologist: Pierre Marie Alexandre Dumoutier (1797–1871)
- Illustrator: Ernest Goupil (1814–1840) (replaced on his death on 1 April 1840 to Hobart-Town by Louis Le Breton surgeon, 3rd class)
- Hydrographer-cartographer: Clément Adrien Vincendon-Dumoulin (1811–1858)
- Publications: J. Dumont d'Urville then Clément Adrien Vincendon-Dumoulin, assisted Desgraz Secretary of L'Astrolabe "Histoire du voyage" from Tome 4 to 10 tome 1, tome 2, tome 3, tome 4, tome 5, volume 6, tome 7, tome 8, tome 9, tome 10.

For all other publications by themes and authors, refer to Expédition Dumont d'Urville in the Publications part.

==== 1837–43: HMS Beagle ====
The mission was the hydrographic survey of the coasts of Australia. In 1839 Lieutenant Stokes sighted a natural harbour which Wickham named Port Darwin after Charles Darwin, who had previously sailed round the world on the Beagle. The later settlement nearby eventually became the city of Darwin, Northern Territory. In 1841 Wickham fell ill, and Stokes took command.

- Captain: John Clements Wickham (1798–1864), succeeded by John Lort Stokes (1812–1885)
- Physician-naturalist: Benjamin Bynoe (1804–1865)
- Publication: J. L. Stokes, Discoveries in Australia, With an Account of the Coasts and Rivers Explored and Surveyed During The Voyage of H.M.S. Beagle, in the Years 1837-38-39-40-41-42-43. By Command of the Lords Commissioners of the Admiralty. Also a Narrative of Captain Owen Stanley's Visits to the Islands in the Arafura Sea. Vol. 1 and Vol. 2 (London, 1846)

==== 1838–42: USS Vincennes and USS Peacock ====
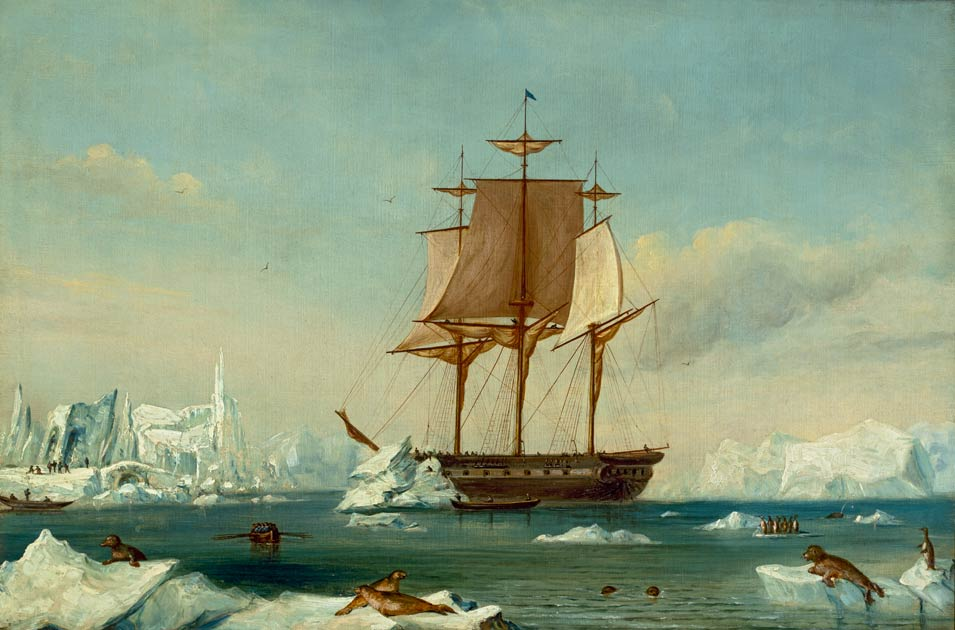
USS Vincennes in Disappointment Bay, Antarctica, during the Wilkes expedition.

The "Wilkes Expedition", included naturalists, botanists, a mineralogist, taxidermists, artists and a philologist in the ships Vincennes, Peacock, the brig Porpoise, the store-ship Relief, and two schooners, Sea Gull, and Flying Fish.

Departing Hampton Roads on 18 August 18, 1838, the expedition stopped at Madeira and Rio de Janeiro, Argentina; visited Tierra del Fuego, Chile, Peru, the Tuamotu Archipelago, Samoa, and New South Wales. From Sydney, the fleet sailed into the Antarctic Ocean in December 1839 and reported the discovery "of an Antarctic continent west of the Balleny Islands" of which it sighted the coast on 25 January 1840. Next, the expedition visited Fiji and the Hawaiian Islands in 1840. In July 1840, two sailors, one of whom was Wilkes' nephew, Midshipman Wilkes Henry, were killed while bartering for food on Malolo, in Fiji. Wilkes' retribution was swift and severe. According to an old man of Malolo Island, nearly 80 Fijians were killed in the incident.

From December 1840 to March 1841, his men with native Hawaiian porters hauled a pendulum to the summit of Mauna Loa to measure gravity. He explored the west coast of North America, including the Strait of Juan de Fuca, Puget Sound, the Columbia River, San Francisco Bay and the Sacramento River, in 1841. The expedition returned by way of the Philippines, the Sulu Archipelago, Borneo, Singapore, Polynesia and the Cape of Good Hope, reaching New York City on 10 June 1842. This was the first circumnavigation of the world funded by the Government of the United States and the last by a sailing vessel. The expedition was poorly prepared and of five vessels which left, only two returned to port. The natural history collections were very rich with 50,000 plant specimens (approximately 10 000 species) and 4,000 specimens of animals (half being new species).

- Captains: Charles Wilkes (1798–1877) (USS Vincennes) and William Levereth Hudson (USS Peacock) (1794–1862)
- Doctor-tries: J.L. Fox
- Naturalists: Charles Pickering (1805–1878), Titian Ramsay Peale (1799–1885), James Dwight Dana (1813–1895), William Dunlop Brackenridge (1810–1893)
- Publication: V. Wilkes, Narrative of the United States exploring Expedition. (twenty volumes, 1845–1876)

==== 1839–43: HMS Erebus and HMS Terror ====
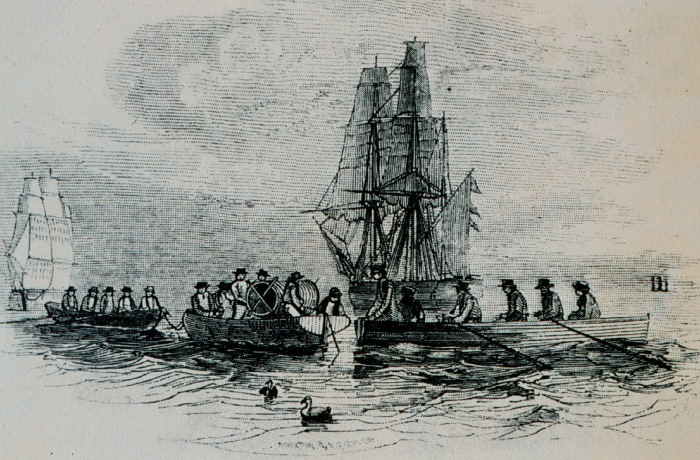
Erebus and Terror, ships of James Clark Ross. The ships were later lost searching for the Northwest Passage under John Franklin.

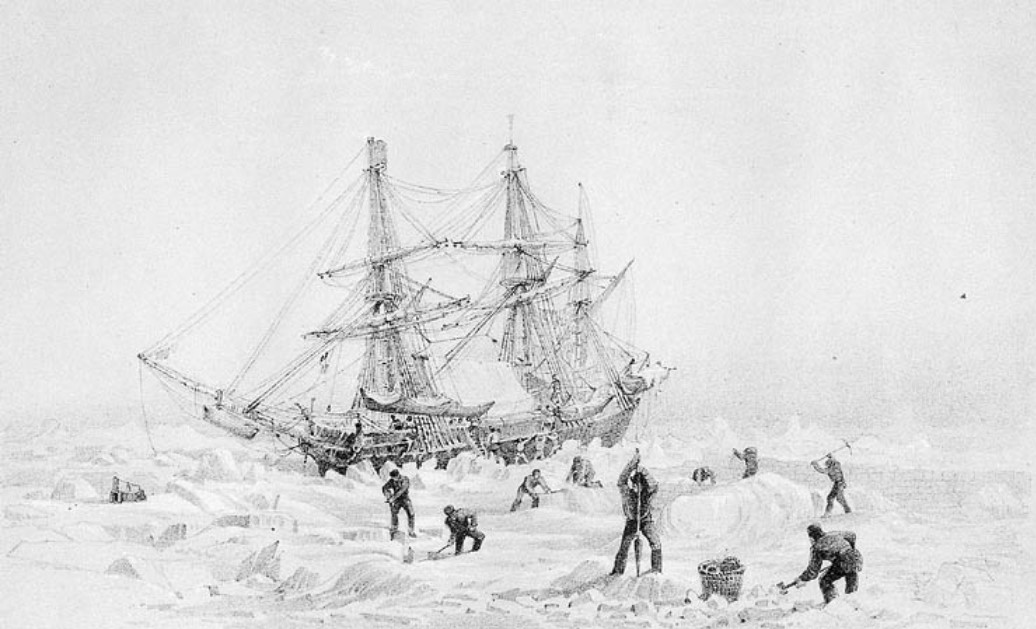
Terror in the Arctic

This British trip, sponsored by the Royal Society, was to discover magnetic and geographic features of the Antarctic. The expedition was prepared with great care by James Clark Ross, already familiar with Polar navigation. The two ships left the United Kingdom on 19 September 1839, stopping to explore the Kerguelen Islands in 1840, and then on Tasmania to build a magnetic observatory for the Antarctic and to conduct cartographic work. Mount Erebus and the Ross Sea were discovered during this journey. After three attempts, Ross admitted that the magnetic pole lay in land that he could not reach. Following the footsteps of his uncle John Ross, he performed the first deep sea surveys up to 4800 m (2677 fathoms), using ropes. Unfortunately biological specimens collected decomposed.

- Captains: Sir James Clark Ross (1800–1862) (Erebus) and Francis Crozier (1796–1848) (Terror)
- Physician-naturalist: Robert McCormick (1800–1890), Joseph Hooker (1817–1911), John Robertson, David Lyall (1817–1895)
- Publications: J.C. Ross, A Voyage of Discovery and Research in the Southern and Antarctic Regions. (1847), J.E. Gray and John Richardson, The zoology of the Voyage of HM Ships Erebus and Terror (1844–1875). J.D. Hooker, The botany of the Antarctic voyage of HM discovery ships Erebus and Terror in the years 1839–1843 under the command of Captain Sir James Clark Ross. Three volumes: I. Flora Antarctica (1844), II. Flora Novae Zelandiae (1853–1855), III. Flora Tasmaniae (1860).

==== 1841–44: La Favorite ====
A French scientific exploration in the China Sea and Indian Ocean.

- Captain: Théogène François Page (1807–1867)
- Surgeon-naturalist: Charles René Augustin Léclancher (1804–1857)

==== 1842–46: HMS Fly ====
During the early to mid-1840s, Fly charted numerous trade and other routes between many locations, primarily off Australia's north-east coast and nearby islands. Such islands included Whitsunday Island and the Capricorn Islands. After being discovered during the survey of the Gulf of Papua, New Guinea, the Fly River was named after HMS Fly. For the most of its seaworthy existence, Fly was captained by Francis Price Blackwood.

- Captain: Francis Price Blackwood (1809–1854)
- Physician-naturalist: Benjamin Bynoe (1804–1865)
- Naturalists: Joseph Beete Jukes (1811–1869) and John MacGillivray (1821–1867)
- Publication: J.B. Jukes, "Narrative of the surveying voyage of H. M. S. ″Fly″, commanded by captain F. P. Blackwood,... in Torres Strait, New Guinea and other islands of the Eastern Archipelago, during the years 1842–1846, together with an excursion into the interior of the Eastern part of Java" (two volumes, 1847).

==== 1845–47: HDMS Galathea ====
The corvette Galathea was sent out by King Christian VIII of Denmark, with its main purposes the handover of the Danish colonies in India to the British East India Company, and exploring and possibly recolonising the Nicobar Islands in the Indian Ocean. Additional aims were the expansion of trade with China and the discovery of new trading opportunities, as well as making extensive scientific collections.

- Captain: Steen Andersen Bille
- Physician-naturalist: Didrik Ferdinand Didrichsen
- Naturalists: Bernhard Casper Kamphǿvener, Carl Emil Kiellerup, Hinrich Johannes Rink, Wilhelm Friedrich Georg Behn and Johannes Theodor Reinhardt.
- Artists: Johan Christian Thornam and Poul August Plum.
- Publication: Steen Bille, Beretning om Corvetten Galathea's Reise omkring Jorden i 1845, 46 og 47, Universitetsboghandler C. U. Reitzels Forlag, Kjøbenhavn 1853

==== 1846–50: HMS Rattlesnake and HMS Bramble ====
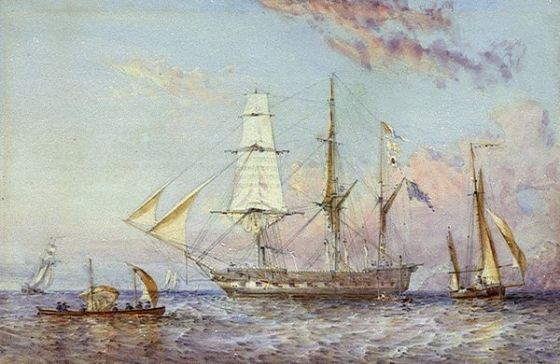
Rattlesnake, painted 1853 by Oswald Brierly, artist on the expedition

A British expedition to the Cape York and Torres Strait areas of northern Australia.

- Captain: Owen Stanley (1811–1850) (Rattlesnake) and Charles Bampfield Yule (Bramble)
- Surgeon: John Thomson
- Physician-naturalist: Thomas Henry Huxley (1825–1895)
- Naturalists: John MacGillivray (1821–1867) and James Fowler Wilcox (1823–1881)
- Artist: Oswald Brierly (1817–1894)
- Publication: J. MacGillivray, Narrative of the Voyage of HMS Rattlesnake. (1852). Goodman, J. The Rattlesnake: A Voyage of Discovery to the Coral Sea. London: Faber & Faber, ISBN 978-0-571-21078-7 (2006). Goodman, J. Losing it in New Guinea: the voyage of HMS Rattlesnake. Endeavour (Elsevier) 29 (2): 60–65, doi:10.1016/j.endeavour.2005.04.005, PMID 15935857 (2005). J. Huxley, T.H. Huxley's diary of the voyage of HMS Rattlesnake. London: Chatto & Windus (1935).

==== 1851–54: Capricieuse ====
A French expedition circumnavigating the world via Cape Horn, stopping in Tahiti and Ualan to determine an astronomical Meridian intended for future travel in the Pacific, then arriving in China. There, the ship performed several missions of exploration including, in July–August 1852, in the seas of Korea and Japan (then very little known in Europe) and on the coasts of Kamchatkata, completely unknown since the Lapérouse expedition. The Capricieuse then returned to France via the Cape of Good Hope. This was the last French global circumnavigation by sail.

- Commander: Commander Gaston de Rocquemaurel (1804–1878)
- Second: Navy lieutenant Jules Duroch
- Publication: The narrative of the voyage remained unpublished.

==== 1851–53: Eugenie ====
A Swedish natural history excursion, the first Swedish circumnavigation of the world, which contributed to the Capture of Manuel Briones, a robber who seized an American whaler, the George Howland, and who was a terror on the coast of the Ecuador.

- Captain: Christian Adolf Virgin (1797–1870).
- Physician-naturalist: Johan Gustaf Hjalmar Kinberg (1820–1908)
- Naturalist: Nils Johan Andersson (1821–1880)
- Publication: N.J. Andersson, Fregatten "Eugenies" resa omkring jorden åren 1851–1853, under befäl af utgifven af, v. a. Virgin v. Skogman ... (Stockholm, 1856).

==== 1852–63: HMS Herald ====
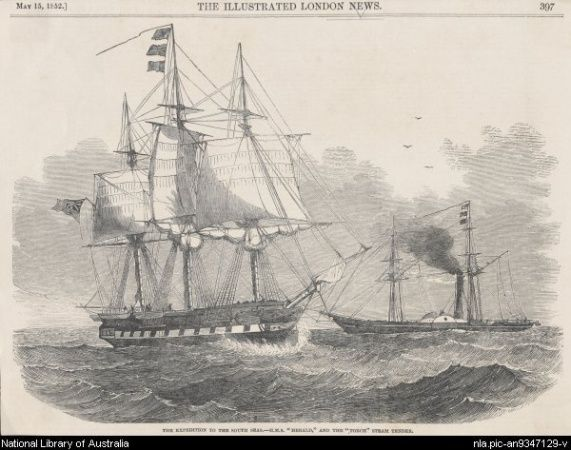
Herald

A survey of the Australian coast and Fiji Islands, continuing the mission of HMS Rattlesnake. Following disagreements with the captain, naturalist John MacGillivray disembarks at Sydney in January 1854. Herald was a 500-ton, 28-gun sixth-rate, launched as Termagant in 1822 and renamed in 1824. She served as a survey ship under Henry Kellett and Henry Mangles Denham and was sold in 1864.

- Captain: Henry Mangles Denham (1800–1887)
- Naturalists: John MacGillivray (1821–1867), William Milne (botanist) and Denis Macdonald as Assistant Surgeon-zoologist.
- Publication: Edward Forbes (1815–1854), The zoology of the voyage of H.M.S. Herald under the command of Captain Henry Kellett,... during the years 1845–51. (London, 1854).

==== 1853–55: USS Vincennes and USS Porpoise ====
(See North Pacific Exploring and Surveying Expedition)

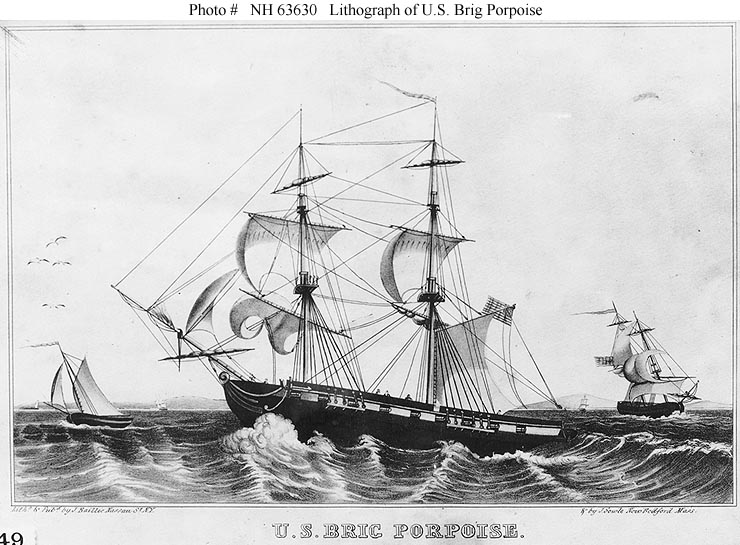
USS Porpoise

This American expedition explored the coasts of Japan, China, Siberia and Kamchatka before putting in at the Cape of Good Hope and returning to the United States. Porpoise sank in a typhoon in 1854.

- Captain: John Rodgers (1812–1882)
- Naturalists: William Stimpson (1832–1872) and Charles Wright (1811–1885)
- Publication: due to the outbreak of civil war, there is no record of this voyage, scientific discoveries have been published separately from scientific journals.

==== 1857–60: SMS Novara ====
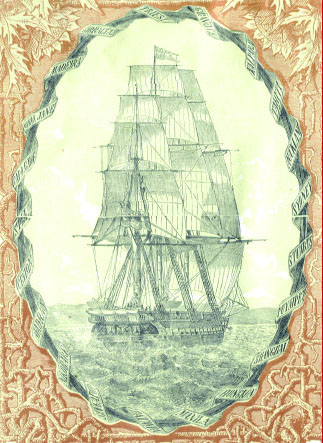
Frigate Novara from the 21 vol. expedition report: Voyage of the Austrian Frigate Novara around the Earth (1861–1876)

An expedition organized by the Emperor of Austria to demonstrate the power of the Crown. Novara departed Trieste in April 1857, passing the Cape of Good Hope to reach the Philippines, Australia, and New Zealand. Fourteen of the forty-four guns were dumped to make more room for the scientific collections.

- Captain: Bernhard von Wüllerstorf-Urbair (1816–1883)
- Naturalists: Ferdinand von Hochstetter (1829–1884), Georg von Frauenfeld (1807–1873) and Johann Zelebor (1819–1869).
- Publication: Reise der österreichischen Fregatte Novara um die Erde in den Jahren 1857, 1858, 1859 unter den Befehlen Commodore b. von Wüllerstorf-Urbair. (1864–1875)

==== 1860: HMS Bulldog ====
An oceanographic survey in HMS Bulldog for the laying of a submarine telegraph cable in the North Atlantic.

- Captain: Francis Leopold McClintock (1819–1907)
- Naturalist: George Charles Wallich (1815–1899)
- Publication: The North Atlantic Sea – Bed; comprising a diary of the voyage on board H. M. S. Bulldog, in 1860, and observations on the presence of animal life, and the formation and nature of organic deposits, at great depths in the ocean. (1862).

==== 1862: Arctic expedition of Krusenstern ====
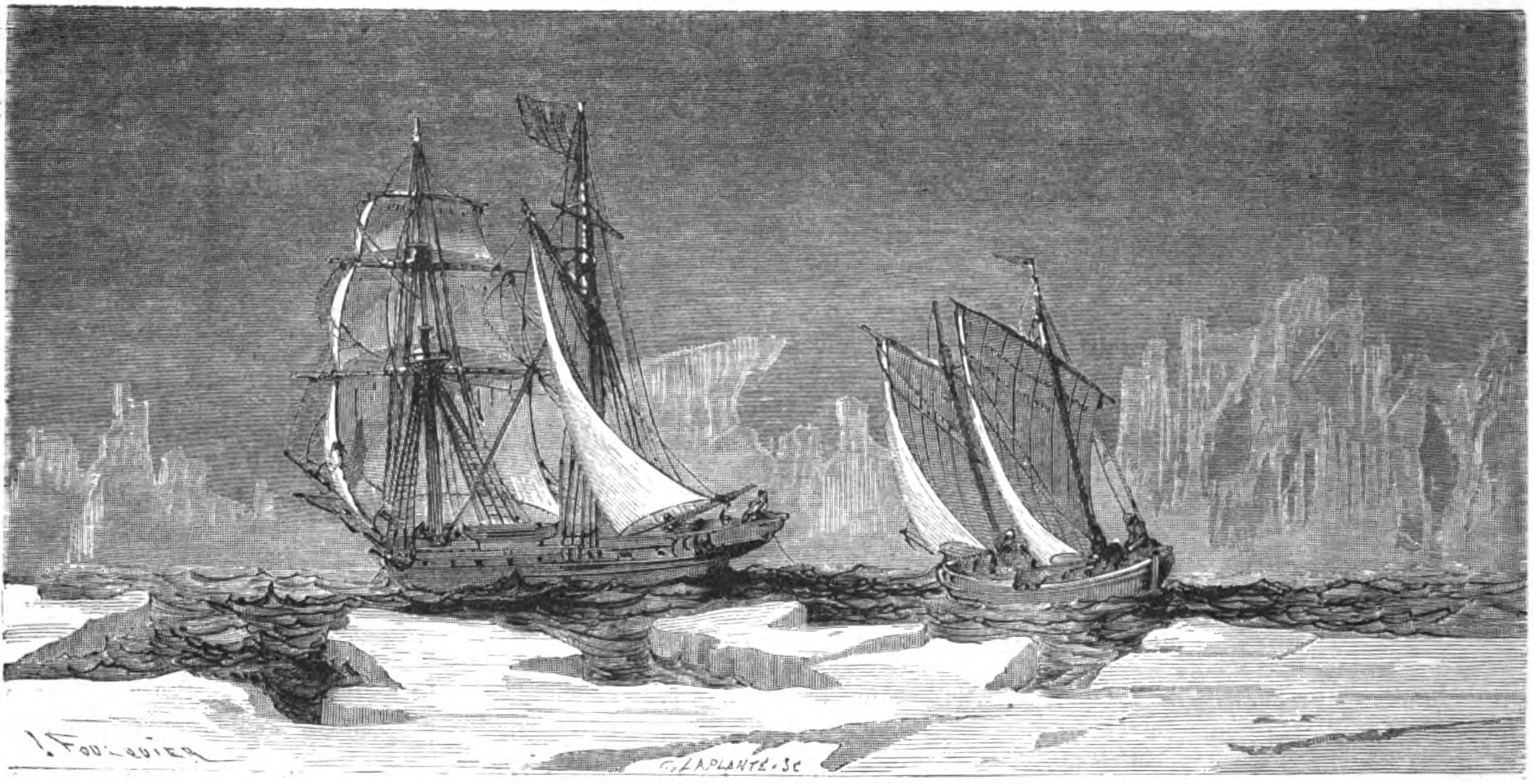
The schooner MV Iermak and the MV Embryo on their ill-fated 1862 voyage of exploration to the gulf of the Yenissei under Krusenstern

Arctic expedition of two ships, MV Iermak and MV Embrio in order to discover the Yenissei river delta, resulted in shipwreck in the Kara Sea.

- Captain: Paul Theodor von Krusenstern
- Publication: Naufrage du lieutenant Krusenstern dans les glaces de la mer de Kara (1863, in Le Tour du monde Volume 8 pp. 203–208)

==== 1865–68: Magenta ====
An Italian circumnavigation of the globe that made important scientific observations in South America. The purpose of the trip was also to establish diplomatic relations with China and Japan, but without success. De Filippi set out in 1866 on a government-sponsored scientific voyage to circumnavigate the globe. The ship, the Italian warship Magenta, sailed under the command of Vittorio Arminjon, departing Montevideo on 2 February 1866. It reached Naples on 28 March 1868. However, De Filippi himself died en route at Hong Kong, on 9 February 1867, from serious dysentery and liver problems. The scientific report was completed by his assistant, Professor Enrico Hillyer Giglioli. Giglioli returned to Italy in 1868.

- Captain: Vittorio Arminjon (1830–1897)
- Naturalists: Filippo de Filippi (1814–1867) and Enrico Hillyer Giglioli (1845–1909)
- Publications: E.H. Giglioli, Note intorno alla distribuzione della Fauna Vertebrata nell oceano prese durante un viaggio intorno al Blobo. (1870) and Viaggio intorno al globo della r. pirocorvetta italiana ″Magenta″ negli anni 1865-66-67-68, sotto it comando del capitano di fregata V. f. Arminjon. Relazione descrittiva e scientifica pubblicata sotto gli auspici del ministero di Agricoltura, industria e commercio dal dottore Enrico Hillyer Giglioli… Con una introduzione etnologica di Paolo Mantegazza. (Milan, 1875).

==== 1865: HMS Curacoa ====
An expedition embarked in Curacoa leaving Sydney in June 1865 to explore the Pacific Islands. One of the objectives is to punish the inhabitants of the islands of Tanna for mistreating a missionary.

- Captain: Sir William Wiseman, 8th Baronet (1814–1874)
- Naturalist: Julius Lucius Brenchley (1816–1873)
- Publication: J.L. Brenchley, Jottings during the cruise of H.M.S. Curoçoa among the south sea islands in 1865. (London, 1873). Collections by Brenchley are handled by various specialists as George Robert Gray (1808–1872) for Albert Günther (1830–1914) birds to fish and reptiles.

==== 1868 and 1869–70: HMS Lightning and HMS Porcupine ====
Two British oceanographic expeditions in the Atlantic Ocean and Mediterranean Sea.

- Captains: Captain May (Porcupine), Killwick Calver (1813–1892) (Lightning).
- Naturalists: Sir Charles Wyville Thomson (1830–1882) and Philip Herbert Carpenter (1813–1885)
- Publication: The Depths of the Sea: An Account of the General Results of the Dredging Cruises of H.M.SS. Porcupine and Lightning during the summers of 1868, 1869, and 1870, Under the Scientific Direction of Dr. Carpenter, J. Gwyn Jeffreys, and Dr. Wyville Thomson.

==== 1873–76: HMS Challenger ====
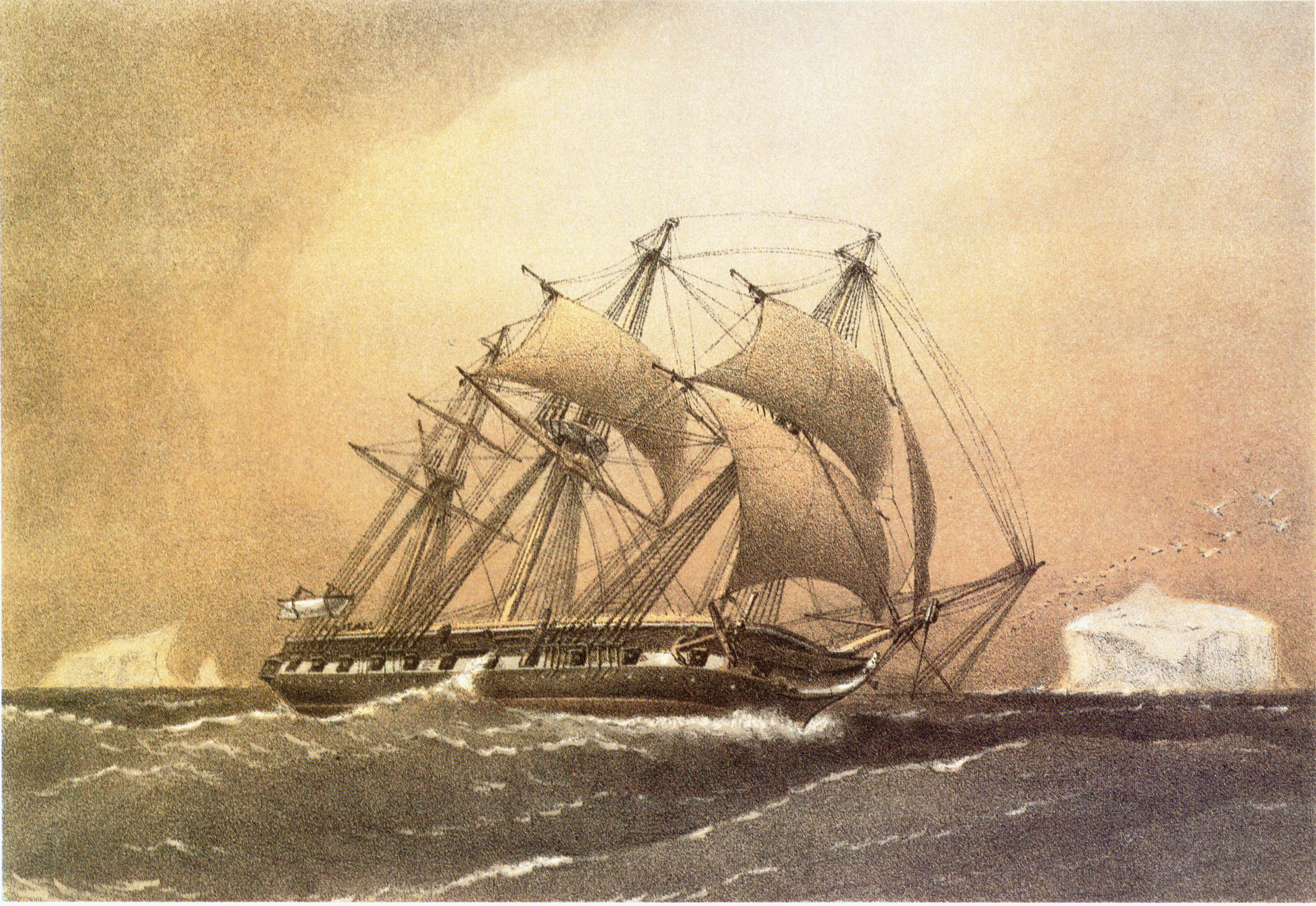
Painting of Challenger by William Frederick Mitchell

The celebrated Challenger Expedition was a grand tour of the world covering 68,000 nautical miles (125,936 km), organised by the Royal Society in London in collaboration with the University of Edinburgh. Charles Thomson was the leader of a large scientific team.

- Captains: George Nares (1873 and 1874) and Frank Tourle Thomson (1875 and 1876)
- Naturalists: Charles Wyville Thomson (1830–1882), Henry Nottidge Moseley (1844–1891) and Rudolf von Willemoes-Suhm (1847–1875)
- Oceanographers: John Young Buchanan (1844–1925) and John Murray (1841–1914)
- Publications: C.W. Thomson, Report on the scientific results of the voyage of HMS Challenger during the years 1873–76… prepared under the superintendence of the late Sir C. Wyville Thomson,... and now of John Murray,... (fifty volumes, London, 1880–1895). H.N. Moseley, Notes by a naturalist on the Challenger (1879). W.J.J. Spry, The cruise of the Challenger (1876).

==== 1875–76: HMS Alert and HMS Discovery ====
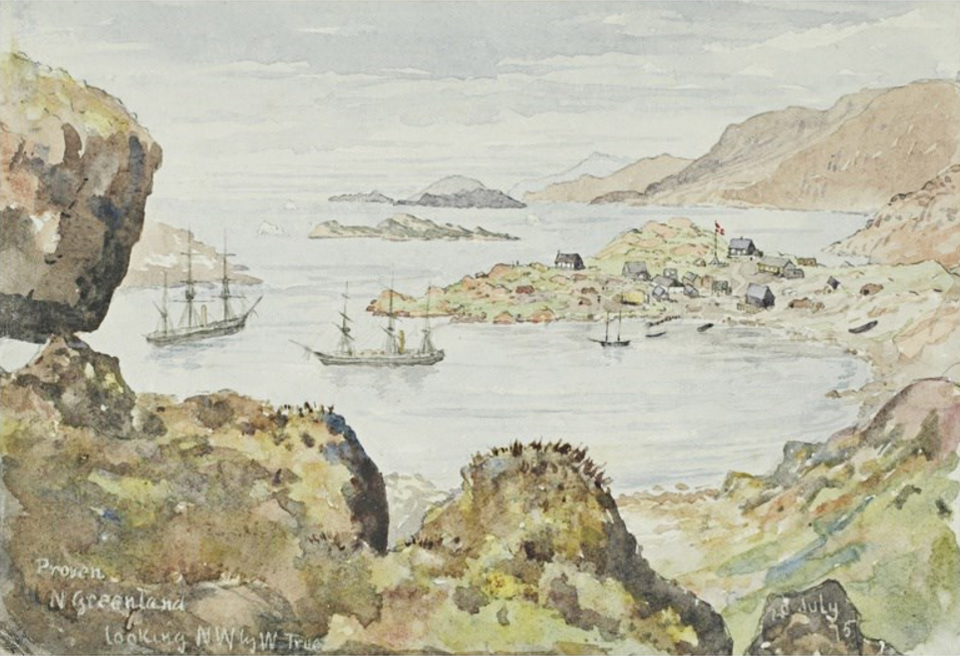
Alert and Discovery at Prøven, North Greenland in 1875, by Edward Lawton Moss

The British Arctic Expedition in Alert and Discovery, seeking to establish the geographic and magnetic North Pole.

- Captain: George Strong Nares (1831–1915)
- Physician-naturalist: Richard William Coppinger (1847–1910) and Edward Lawton Moss
- Naturalists: Henry Chichester Hart (1847–1908) and Henry Fielden
- Publication: G. Nares, Narrative of a voyage to the Polar Sea during 1875–6 in the ships HMS Alert and HMS Discovery. (London, 1878); translated into French (Paris, 1877).

==== 1881: USRC Thomas Corwin ====
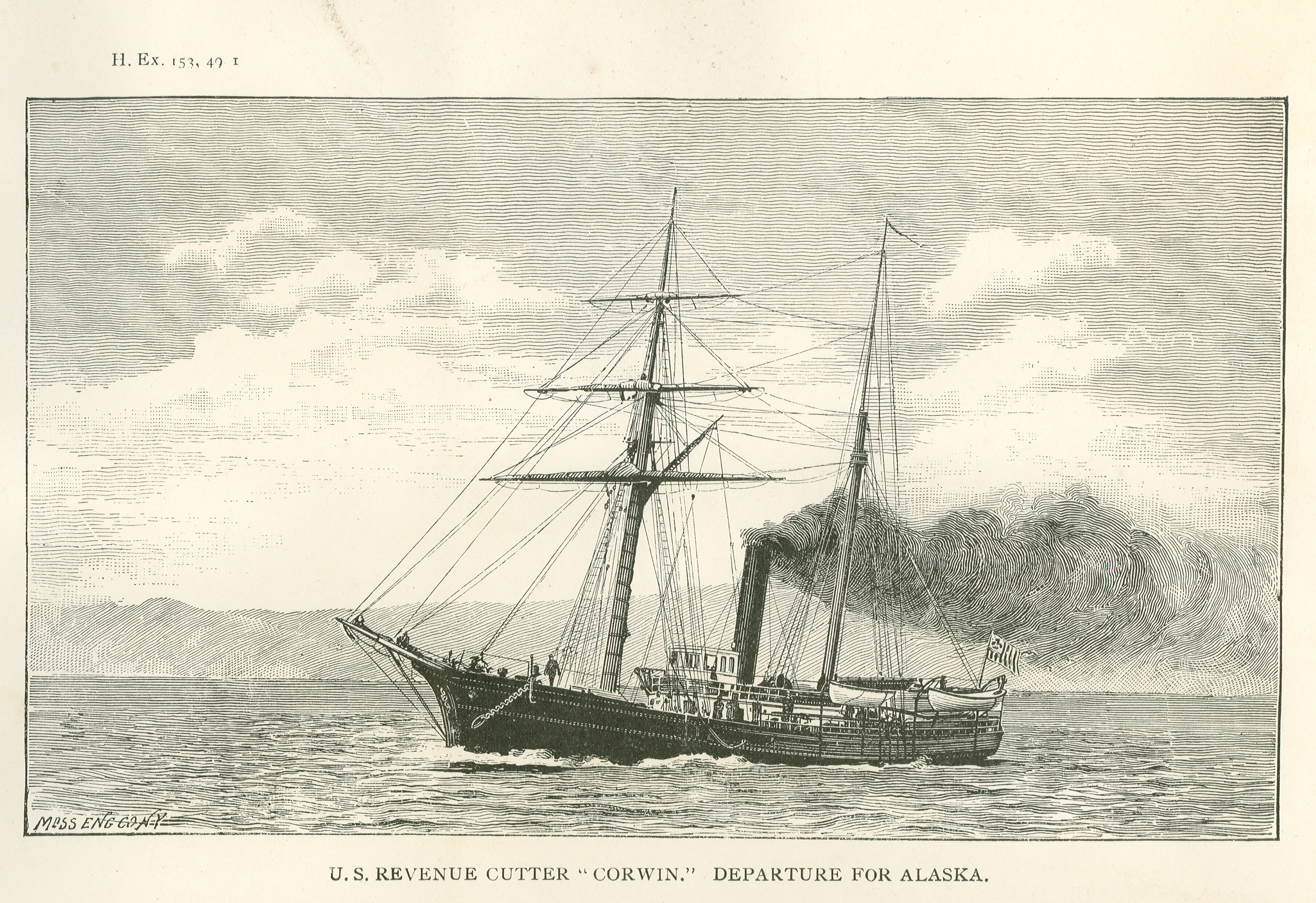
USRC Thomas Corwin: Departure for Alaska, 1885

Several expeditions were conducted in the Bering Sea in 1881 to find the Jeannette and two whaling ships. Wrangel Island was discovered and made part of the United States in August 1881 with the landing of famed explorer John Muir and the crew of U. S. Revenue Marine ship Thomas Corwin under the command of Captain Calvin Leighton Hooper. The landing at the mouth of the Clark River was illustrated by Muir in his book The Cruise of the Corwin. Two weeks after the Corwin took possession, USS John Rodgers conducted a complete survey of the island, which turned out to equal the size of Rhode Island and Delaware combined.

- Captain: Calvin Leighton Hooper
- Naturalist: Edward William Nelson (1855–1934)
- Explorer: John Muir (1838–1914)
- Publication: Muir, J. The Cruise of the Corwin.

==== 1882–83: La Romanche ====
The French Navy frigate La Romanche was built for a French multidisciplinary expedition on a scientific mission to Tierra del Fuego. The primary object was to observe and photograph the transit of the planet Venus. The expedition also collected specimens of flora and fauna, and studied local Yahgan indigenous people, with the assistance of local Anglican missionary Thomas Bridges. (See also Romanche Glacier)

- Captain: Ferdinand Martial
- Officers/photographers: Payen, Doze
- Botanists: Émile Bescherelle, Paul Auguste Hariot, Adrien René Franchet, Paul Petit
- Doctor/geologist/ anthropologist: Paul Hyades
- Ornithologist: Emile Oustalet

==== 1882–85: Vettor Pisani ====
The Vettor Pisani was an Italian naval corvette equipped for scientific exploration.

==== 1886–96: USS Albatross ====
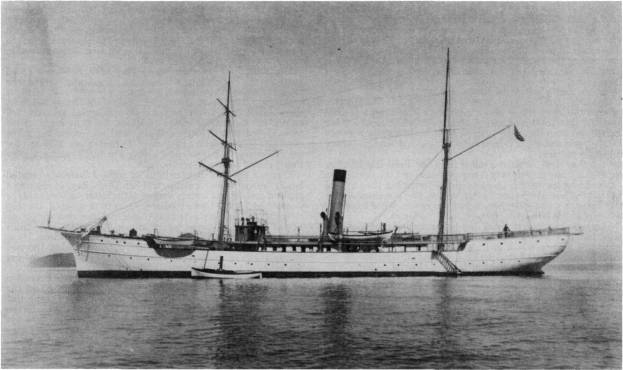
United States Fish Commission Steamer Albatross, in the 1890s

Albatross belonged to the Committee on Fisheries of the United States and it carried out numerous scientific expeditions under the direction of Alexander Emanuel Agassiz (1835–1910). The primary goal was an inventory of the Pacific fishery reserves but many other observations are carried out by Townsend and other scientists.

- Captain: Zera Tanner (1835–1906)
- Naturalist: Charles Haskins Townsend (1859–1944)

==== 1897–98: Lila and Mattie ====
Zoologist Walter Rothschild commissioned the Webster-Harris Expedition to the Galápagos Islands from June 1897 to February 1898. This expedition on the schooner Lila & Mattie is well-described in the 1983 book titled Dear Lord Rothschild by Miriam Rothschild. In the 1936 book Oceanic Birds of South America by Robert Cushman Murphy, Rollo Beck describes the seminal telegram from C.M Harris that started his long and important association with the Galápagos Islands. The original of this telegram is in the Rollo Beck Collection in the California Academy of Sciences Archives. There is also a photo from Beck's Sierra Nevada collecting trip in the archives of the Museum of Vertebrate Zoology on the University of California, Berkeley campus. The story of buried treasure on Tower Island connected with this trip was apparently known to Captain Lindbridge during this voyage, but the information was not revealed until after the group had left Tower Island. This trip lasted from June 1897 to February 1898, after having started on a tragic note with the deaths of three of the original crew to Yellow Fever, and having to reconstitute the expedition in San Francisco, California.

- Naturalist: Rollo Beck (1870–1950)
- Organizer: Frank Blake Webster
- Organizer: Charles Miller Harris

==== 1897–98: Belgica ====
Adrien de Gerlache was an officer in the Belgian Royal Navy who led the Belgian Antarctic Expedition of 1897 to 1899. He acquired Le Patria in 1896 renaming it Belgica. He left Antwerp on 16 August 1897 passing winter in the Antarctic before returning to Belgium on 5 November 1898.

- Captain: Adrien de Gerlache (1866–1934)
- Naturalist: Emil Racovita (1868–1947)

==== 1898–99: Valdivia ====
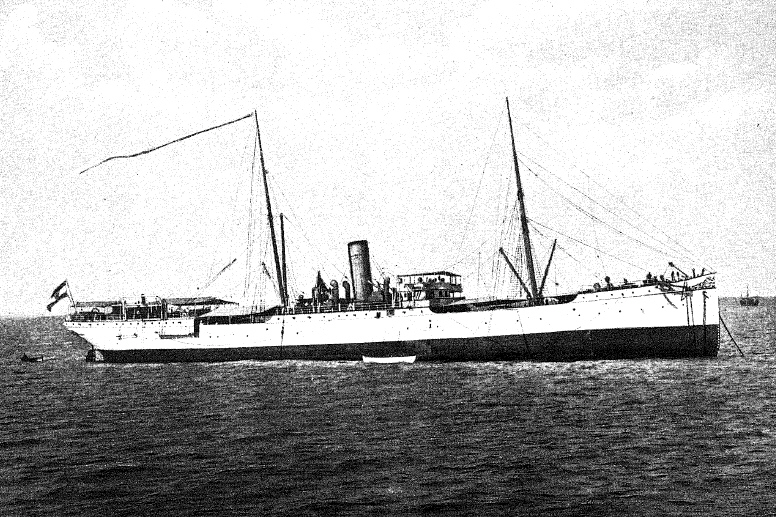
Valdivia, 1898

A German deep-sea expedition exploring in Antarctic regions, the Valdivia being a steamship in the Hamburg-American line of steamers. The subscription was launched by Georg von Neumayer (1826–1909) and only consisted of a single vessel instead of the two planned. The expedition quickly reached the Cape of Good Hope where the study of deep waters began. The ship reached Antarctic pack ice and rediscovered Bouvet Island followed by the Kerguelen Islands. For the first time, evidence of deep water in this region was provided by survey. The Valdivia then passed to the Indian Ocean, studying the coast of Sumatra before returning to its port of origin 29 April 1899.

- Captain: Adalbert Krech (1852–1907)
- Naturalist: Carl Chun (1852–1914).
- Publication: C. Chun (1903), "Aus den Tiefen des Weltmeeres".

== See also ==
- Circumnavigation
- History of navigation
- List of explorers
- List of circumnavigations
- United States Coast and Geodetic Survey
- U.S. National Geodetic Survey
- Chronology of European exploration of Asia
- Timeline of European exploration
- List of Arctic expeditions
- List of Antarctic expeditions
- Apostles of Linnaeus
- Capture of Manuel Briones

== Bibliography ==
- Bauchot, Marie-Louise; Daget, Jacques & Bauchot, Roland (1997). "Ichthyology in France at the Beginning of the 19th Century: The Histoire Naturelle des Poissons of Cuvier (1769–1832) and Valenciennes (1794–1865)". In Collection Building in Ichthyology and Herpetology (Pietsch T.W. & Anderson W.D., eds), American Society of Ichthyologists and Herpetologists: 27–80. ISBN 0-935868-91-7
- Broc, Numa (1988, 1992, 1999, 2003). Dictionnaire illustré des explorateurs et grands voyageurs français du XIXe siècle. 4 vols, Éditions du Comité des Travaux historiques et scientifiques (Paris. ISBN 2-7355-0158-2, 2-7355-0233-3, 2-7355-0391-7, 2-7355-0461-1
- Brosse, Jacques (1983). Great Voyages of Exploration. The Golden Age of Discovery in the Pacific. Transl. Stanley Hochman. Sydney: Doubleday. ISBN 0-86824-182-2.
- Colledge, J. J.; Warlow, Ben (2006) [1969]. Ships of the Royal Navy: The Complete Record of All Fighting Ships of the Royal Navy from the 15th Century to the Present (3rd Rev ed.). London: Chatham Publishing. ISBN 978-1-86176-281-8. OCLC 67375475.
- Daum, Andreas (2019). "German Naturalists in the Pacific around 1800: Entanglement, Autonomy, and a Transnational Culture of Expertise". In Berghoff, Hartmut (ed.). Explorations and Entanglements: Germans in Pacific Worlds from the Early Modern Period to World War I. Berghahn Books. pp. 79–102.
- Dunmore, John (1992). Who's Who in Pacific Navigation. Melbourne University Press. ISBN 0-522-84488-X.
- King, P. Parker (1839). Narrative of the first surveying voyage of H.M. ships "Adventure" and "Beagle", between the years 1826 and 1836, describing their examination of the Southern shores of South-America and the "Beagle's" circumnavigation of the world ... [containing the proceedings of the first expedition, 1826–1830 under the command of Captain P. Parker King]. Vol. i. London.
- Mearns, Barbara & Mearns, Richard (1998). The Bird collectors. Academic Press (London): xvii + 472 p. ISBN 0-12-487440-1
- Rice, Tony (2010). Voyages of Discovery. London: Allen & Unwin. ISBN 978-1-74237-225-9.
- Sardet, Michel (2007). Naturalists and explorers of the Health Service of the Navy in the 19th century. Pharmathèmes (Paris): 285 p. ISBN 978-2-914399-17-3
- Singaravélou, Pierre (ed.) (2008). The empire of Geographers: geography, exploration and colonization, 19th–20th century. Belin (Paris): 287 p. ISBN 978-2-7011-4677-5
- Sloane, Hans (1707–1725). A voyage to the islands Madera, Barbados, Nieves, S. Christophers and Jamaica :with the natural history of the herbs and trees ... British Museum.
- Speake, Jennifer, ed. (2003). Literature of Travel and Exploration: An Encyclopedia. New York: Fitzroy Dearborn. ISBN 1-57958-247-8. OCLC 55631133.
- Taillemite, Étienne (2004). The discoverers of the Pacific: Bougainville, Cook, Lapérouse. Gallimard (Paris), collection Discovery: 176 p. ISBN 978-2-07-076333-7
- Zanco, Jean-Philippe (2008). The legacy forgotten Dumont d'Urville and explorers of the Pacific: voyages of Gaston de Rocquemaurel, 1837–1854. Symposium Lapérouse and French explorers of the Pacific, Museum of the Navy, 17–18 October 2008,
