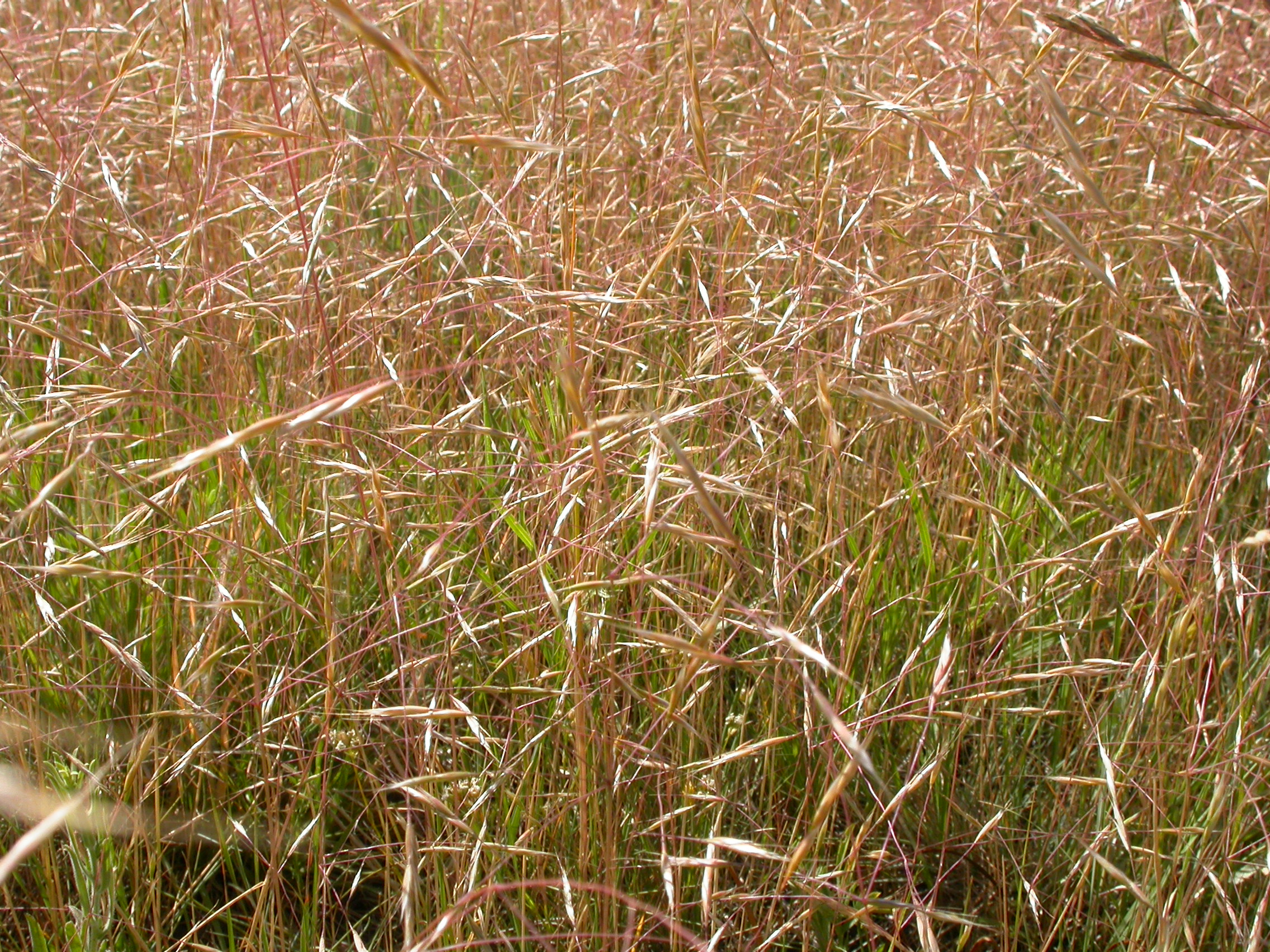

Scientific classification
- Kingdom: Plantae
- Clade: Tracheophytes
- Clade: Angiosperms
- Clade: Monocots
- Clade: Commelinids
- Order: Poales
- Family: Poaceae
- Subfamily: Pooideae
- Genus: Ventenata
- Species: V. dubia

Binomial name
- Ventenata dubia (Leers) Coss.

= Ventenata dubia =

Species of grass

Ventenata dubia is a species of grass known by the common names North Africa grass and wiregrass. It is native to southern Europe, North Africa and the Middle East. It is becoming well known in North America, where it is an introduced species and a noxious weed of cultivated and disturbed habitat. It is problematic in the Pacific Northwest, where it was first identified in Washington in 1952 and Idaho in 1957. It was found in Utah in 1996. It probably spreads when it gets mixed in with grass seed and is transported and inadvertently planted.

This is an annual grass growing 15 to 70 centimeters tall with thin, branching stems that are naked and wiry. These wiry stems make the grass hard to cut. The inflorescence is an open panicle with very slender, spreading branches bearing spikelets at their tips. The spikelet is 1 to 1.5 centimeters in length and has riblike longitudinal veins. The upper flower has a wavy awn up to 1.5 centimeters long.
