= Louis Ventenat =

Louis Ventenat (1765 - 1794) was a French Catholic priest and naturalist born in Limoges. He was the brother of botanist Étienne Pierre Ventenat (1757-1808).

Ventenat was a member of a mission led by Antoine Bruni d'Entrecasteaux (1737-1793) in a search for explorer Jean-François de La Pérouse (1741-1788), of whom there was no news of for five years. Ventenat served as chaplain and naturalist on the expedition. In 1793 he and other members of the expedition were captured by Dutch authorities, and imprisoned in the Dutch East Indies. In captivity he became gravely ill, but was able to obtain leave to the Île-de-France, where he died soon afterwards.

Ventenat's botanical collections were preserved by Benjamin Delessert (1773-1784) at an herbarium in Geneva. Dutch botanist Friedrich Anton Wilhelm Miquel (1811-1871) dedicated the botanical species Peperomia ventenatii in his honor.

== See also ==
- European and American voyages of scientific exploration
