= Jean Marie Despréaux =

French botanist, lichenologist and mycologist

Louis Jean Marie Despréaux Saint-Sauveur
- Born: 20 December 1794; Fougères, France
- Died: 27 November 1843 (aged 48); Mexico City, Mexico
- Citizenship: French
- Known for: Morea expedition in Greece (1829)
- Scientific career
- Fields: botany
- Author abbrev. (botany): Despr.

Jean-Marie Despréaux or Louis Despréaux Saint-Sauveur, born on 20 December 1794 in Fougères and deceased on 27 November 1843 in Mexico City, was a French botanist.

== Life ==
Jean-Marie Despréaux participated in several Napoleonic campaigns. After practicing for a few years as a doctor, he got involved in politics, belonged to the editorial staff of the National and was a member of the scientific mission in Morea in 1829, within the Section of Physical Sciences led by the naturalist Jean-Baptiste Bory de Saint-Vincent. In addition to his participation in the scientific exploration of Greece, he participated later to that in the Canary Islands.

He then settled as a doctor in Mexico City and created a company for the exploitation of the resin of the trees of Mayorazgo (it was a failure) and published articles in the magazine El Museo Mexicano.

Jean-Marie Despréaux was a specialist of cryptogams, and in particular of lichens, fungi and algae. The species Convolvulus × despreauxii, endemic to the Canary Islands and of which he collected the nomenclatural type specimen in April 1839 in the mountains near Santiago del Teide in the Canaries Islands, was named after him.
