= Étienne Pierre Ventenat =

Late 18th century French botanist and taxonomist (1757-1808)

Étienne Pierre Ventenat (1 March 1757 – 13 August 1808) was a French botanist born in Limoges. He was the brother of naturalist Louis Ventenat.

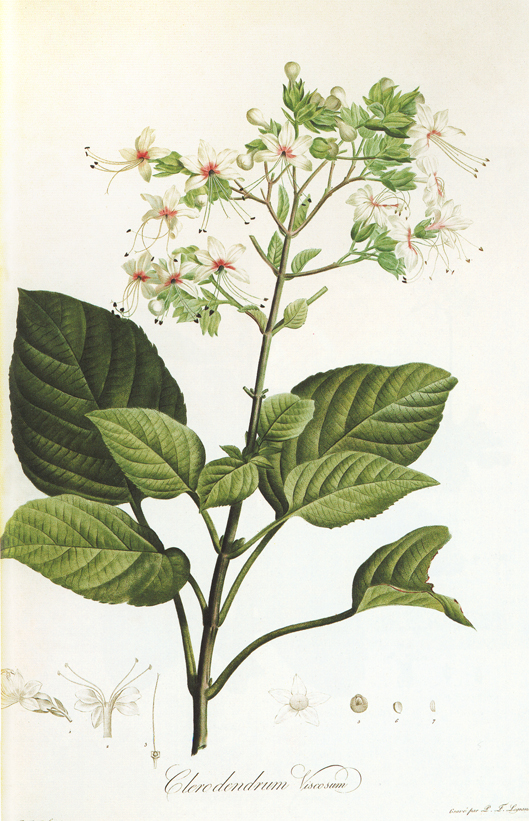
Clerodendrum viscosum, Jardin de La Malmaison

While employed as director of the ecclesiastic library Sainte-Geneviève in Paris, Ventenat took a trip to England. Here he investigated the country's botanical gardens, inspiring him to pursue a vocation in sciences. Following his time at library he became an active botanist, studying under and collaborating with botanist Charles Louis L'Héritier de Brutelle. In 1795 he was elected a member of the Institut national des sciences et des arts, later known as the Académie des sciences.

In 1794 he wrote a treatise on the principles of botany titled Principes de botanique, expliqués au Lycée républicain par Ventenat. After publication he became so disappointed with its mediocrity that he reportedly made efforts to procure all copies of the book and have them destroyed. In 1798 he published a French translation of Antoine-Laurent de Jussieu's Genera plantarum as Tableau du règne végétal selon la méthode de Jussieu. In his translation of the work, Ventenat added information involving the properties and uses of plants.

In 1799 he published Description des plantes nouvelles et peu connues, cultivées dans le jardin de J.-M. Cels, a work that described flora in the botanical garden of Jacques Philippe Martin Cels, and in 1803 he published Le Jardin de la Malmaison, being written at the request of Joséphine de Beauharnais, who wished to immortalize the rare species of plants found in the gardens and greenhouses of Château de Malmaison. The illustrations in the two aforementioned works were performed by botanical artist Pierre-Joseph Redouté. Ventenat is also credited with continuing the work on Jean Baptiste François Pierre Bulliard's Histoire des champignons de la France, a landmark work on mushrooms native to France.

== Works ==
- Principes de botanique : expliqués au Lycée républicain 1792
- Ventenat, Étienne-Pierre (1799). Tableau du règne végétal, selon la méthode de Jussieu 3 vols (in French). Paris: J. Drisonnier.
  - Vol. I Discours sur l'étude de la botanique p. i, Dictionaire de botanique p. 1, Nomenclature méthodique p. 579
  - Vol. II Acotylédones p. 1, Monocotylédones p. 75, Dicotylédones p. 225
  - Vol. III Dicotylédones (continued: Class 12 Polypetales onwards) Schema p. 139
- Description des plantes nouvelles et peu connues, cultivées dans le jardin de J.-M. Cels, 1799
- Choix de plantes : dont la plupart sont cultivées dans le jardin de Cels 1803
- Ventenat, É. P (1803–1804). Jardin de la Malmaison 2 vols (in French). Paris: Crapelet.
- Decas Generum Novorum, 1808.

== Bibliography ==
- Adrien Davy de Virville (dir.),Histoire de la botanique en France, SEDES, Paris, 1955 : 394 p.
- H. Walter Lack, Un Jardin d’Eden. Chefs-d’œuvre de l’illustration botanique, Taschen, Cologne, 2001 : 576 p.
- William Wheeler, L'Illustration botanique, Les Éditions du Carrousel, Paris, 1999 : 175 p.
- Stearn, William Thomas (28 February 1939). "Ventenat's "Description des Plantes... de J. M. Cels," "Jardin de la Malmaison" and "Choix des Plantes"". Journal of the Society for the Bibliography of Natural History. 1 (7): 199–201. doi:10.3366/jsbnh.1939.1.7.199.
- Callmander, Martin W.; Durbin, Olivier D.; Lack, Hans-Walter; Bungener, Patrick; Martin, Pascal; Gautier, Laurent (3 April 2017). "Etienne-Pierre Ventenat (1757–1808) and the Gardens of Cels and Empress Joséphine". Candollea. 72 (1): 87–132. doi:10.15553/c2017v721a8. S2CID 90248584.
