= Louis Eugène Robert =

French naturalist, geologist and entomologist (1806–1882)

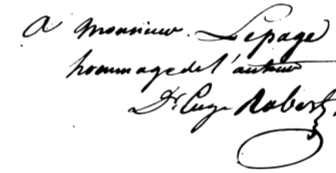
- Born: 6 December 1806; Meudon, France
- Died: 28 May 1882 (aged 75); Sézanne, France
- Occupation: Naturalist
- Known for: Accompanying the La Recherche Expedition as a naturalist

Louis Eugène Robert (6 December 1806 – 28 May 1882) was a French naturalist, geologist, and entomologist.

Robert wrote numerous works on forest insects and geology, along with a treatise on the human and environmental history of his hometown of Meudon. He served as mayor of Meudon from 1870 to 1871. He was a friend of Félix Édouard Guérin-Méneville.

Robert accompanied scientific expeditions to Central America, Iceland, Greenland, Scandinavia, and Lapland as a member of the La Recherche Expeditions of 1836 and 1838, led by Francois Thomas Tréhouart. Robert served as a naturalist alongside Joseph Paul Gaimard during the second voyage of La Recherche.
