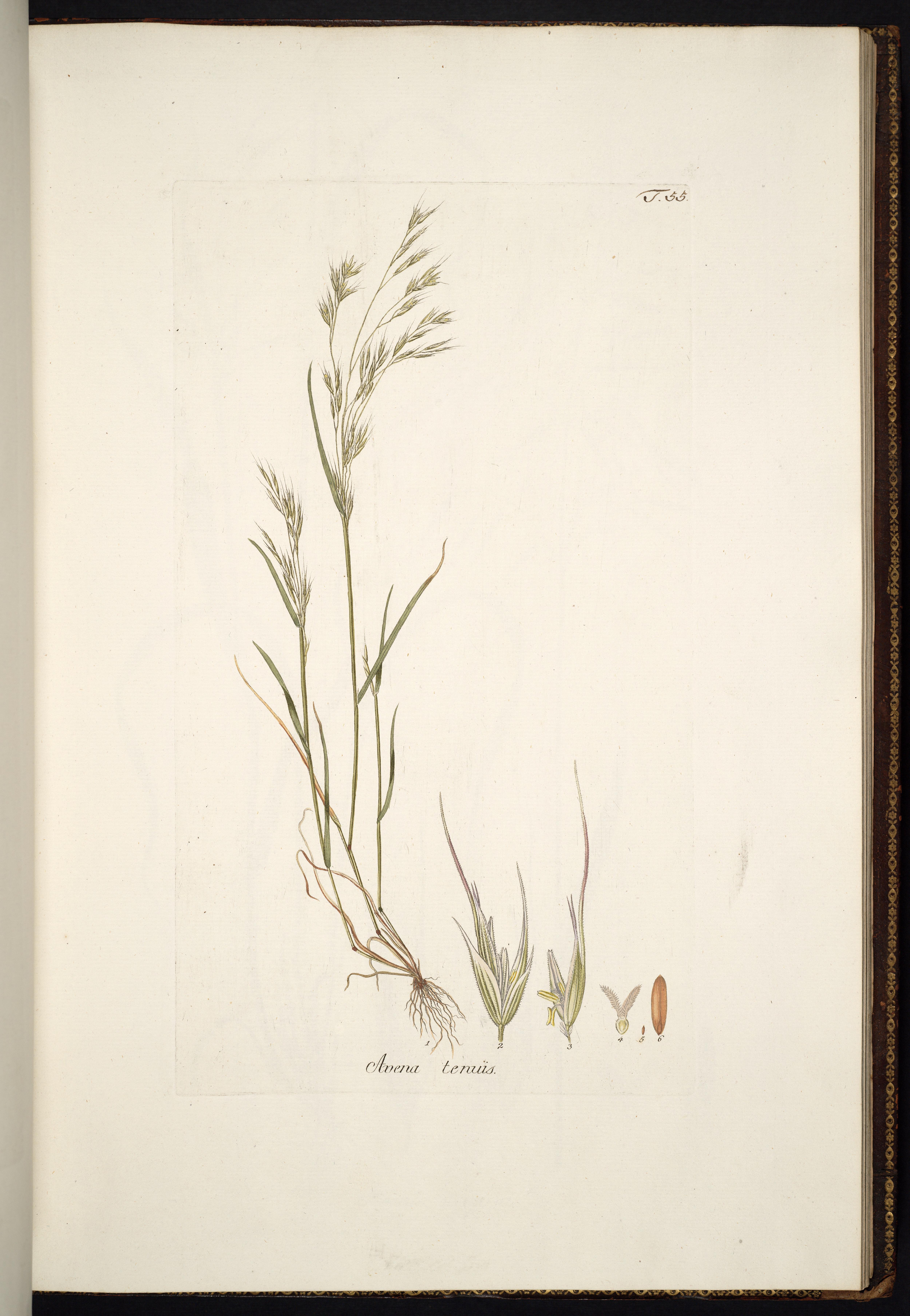
- Ventenata dubia

Scientific classification
- Kingdom: Plantae
- Clade: Tracheophytes
- Clade: Angiosperms
- Clade: Monocots
- Clade: Commelinids
- Order: Poales
- Family: Poaceae
- Subfamily: Pooideae
- Supertribe: Poodae
- Tribe: Poeae
- Subtribe: Ventenatinae
- Genus: Ventenata; Koeler

Type species
- Ventenata avenacea (syn of V. dubia) Koeler

Synonyms
- Gaudinopsis (Boiss.) Eig; Heteranthus Borkh., rejected name; Heterochaeta Besser not DC. 1836 (Asteraceae); Malya Opiz; Pilgerochloa Eig

= Ventenata =

Genus of grasses

Ventenata is a genus of plants in the grass family, native to Europe, North Africa, and central + southwest Asia. One species, Ventenata dubia, is considered an invasive weed in many places.

Species

- Ventenata blanchei Boiss. - Lebanon, Syria, Palestine, Jordan, Israel
- Ventenata dubia (Leers) Coss. & Durieu - central Europe, Mediterranean, Ukraine, southern European Russia, Caucasus, Turkey, Kazakhstan; naturalized in parts of North America
- Ventenata eigiana (H.Scholz & Raus) Dogan - Turkey
- Ventenata huber-morathii (Dogan) D.Heller - Turkey
- Ventenata macra (Steven) Balansa ex Boiss. - Greece, Crimea, Turkmenistan, Turkey, Iran, Iraq, Turkey, Caucasus, Cyprus
- Ventenata quercetorum Boiss. & Bal. - Turkey
- Ventenata sorgerae (Dogan) D.Heller - Turkey
- Ventenata subenervis Boiss. & Balansa - Turkey, islands of Eastern Aegean
