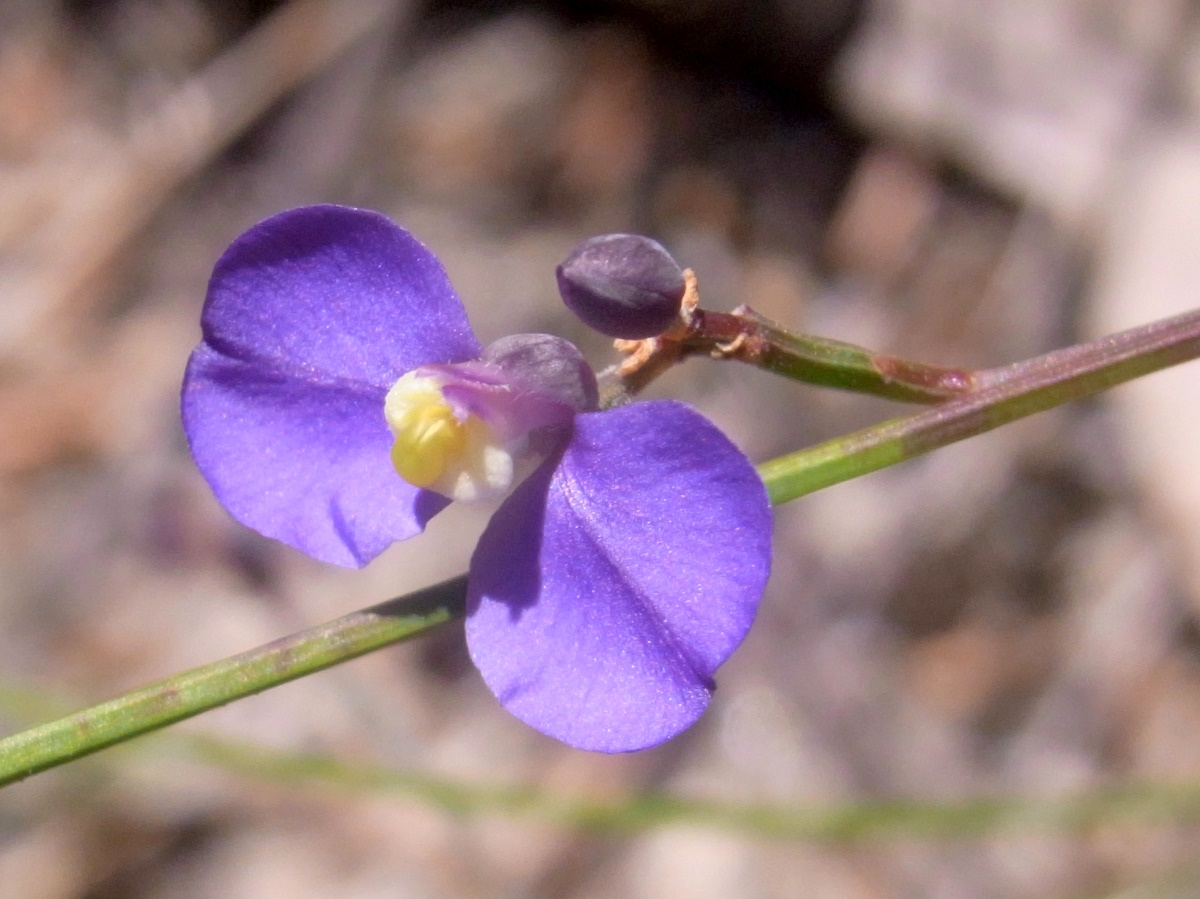
- Ku-ring-gai Chase National Park, Australia

Scientific classification
- Kingdom: Plantae
- Clade: Tracheophytes
- Clade: Angiosperms
- Clade: Eudicots
- Clade: Rosids
- Order: Fabales
- Family: Polygalaceae
- Genus: Comesperma
- Species: C. sphaerocarpum

Binomial name
- Comesperma sphaerocarpum Steetz
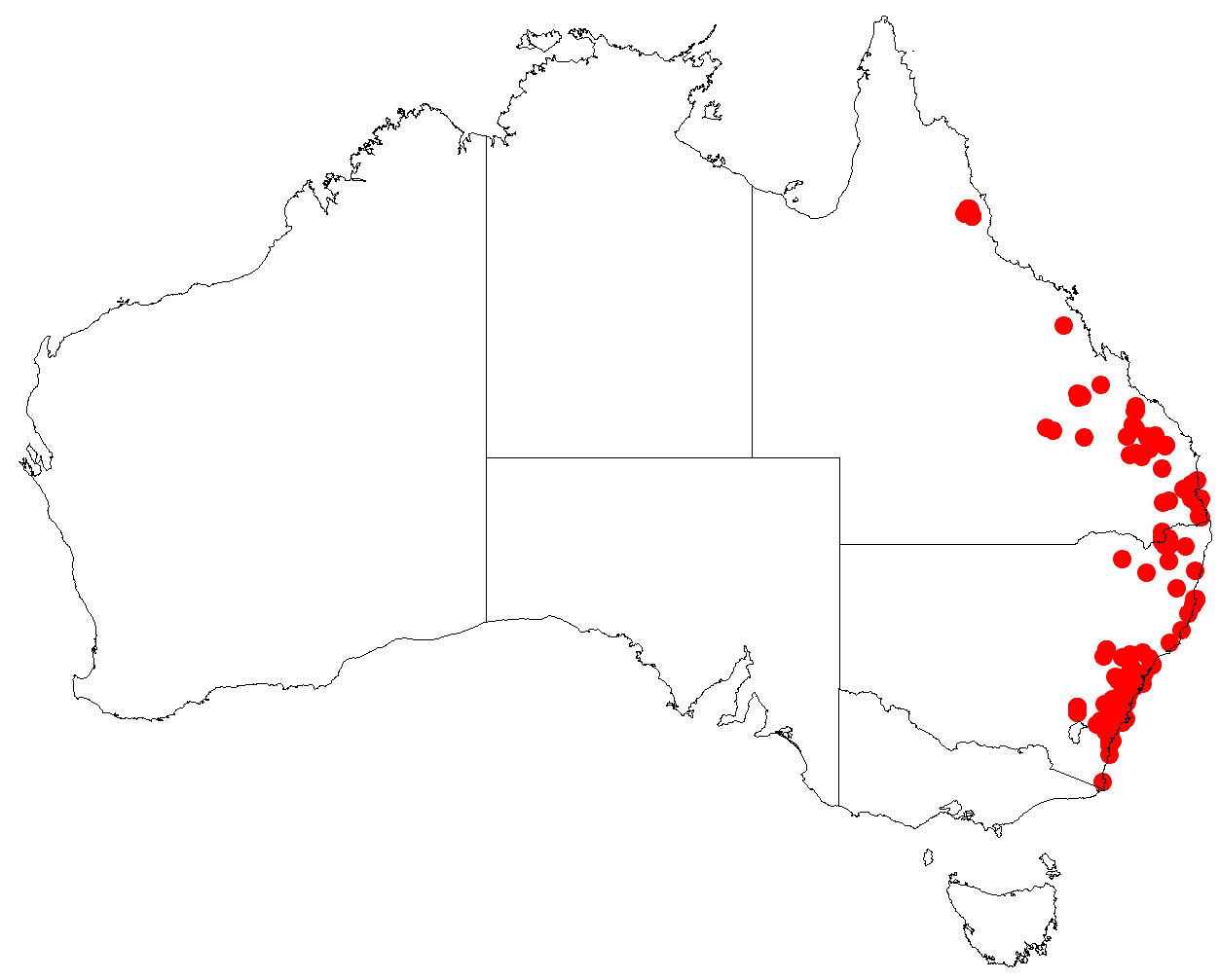
- Occurrence data from AVH

Synonyms
- * Bredemeyera sphaerocarpa (Steetz) Steenis

= Comesperma sphaerocarpum =

Species of flowering plant

Comesperma sphaerocarpum, commonly known as the broom milkwort, is an Australian plant in the milkwort family. Inconspicuous unless in flower, it grows from 10 to 30 cm (4 to 12 in) high. The stems are ridged and usually leafless, and arise from the plant's woody base. The rarely seen leaves are at the base of the shoot. They are thick in texture, and measure 8 mm long by 2 mm wide. This plant first appeared in scientific literature in Plantae Preissianae in 1846, authored by the German botanist Joachim Steetz.

Endemic to New South Wales, Comesperma sphaerocarpum is found along the tablelands and coast, from Warialda in the north to Nowra. In the Sydney region it is found in the Munmorah State Conservation Area, Royal, Lane Cove and Brisbane Water National Parks and other bushland reserves.

The habitat is sandy soils in heathland or low eucalyptus country, sometimes in high rainfall areas. The specific epithet sphaerocarpum is from the Ancient Greek, referring to the ball-shaped fruit. The attractive violet or blue flowers form from October to May. The width of the flower is around 1 cm (0.5 in). The fruit is somewhat broadly triangular or round, and tapers to the stem, although not as prominently tapered as are other plants in this genus. The fruit is 4 mm long.

Its habit distinguishes it from the related pink matchheads or heath milkwort (Comesperma ericinum) which has erect stems, and the love creeper (Comesperma volubile) which has a twining habit.

In cultivation this plant prefers sunny situations in moist infertile soils.
