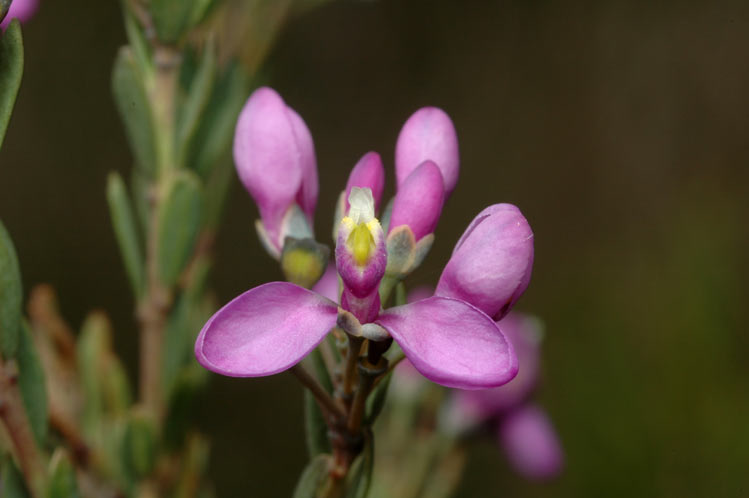

Scientific classification
- Kingdom: Plantae
- Clade: Tracheophytes
- Clade: Angiosperms
- Clade: Eudicots
- Clade: Rosids
- Order: Fabales
- Family: Polygalaceae
- Genus: Comesperma
- Species: C. retusum

Binomial name
- Comesperma retusum Labill.

= Comesperma retusum =

Milkwort

Species of plant

Comesperma retusum, commonly known as milkwort, is a slender herb in the family Polygalaceae. It is an upright shrub with purple or mauve-pink pea-like flowers and grows in eastern Australia.

== Description ==
Comesperma retusum is a small, upright, leafy shrub to 1.5 m (4 ft 11 in) high and sparsely branched with more or less, pinkish warty stems. The leaves are elliptic to oblong-shaped, thick, 5–15 mm (0.20–0.59 in) long, 2–3 mm (0.079–0.118 in) wide and blunt or with a small point at the apex. The flowers are in a terminal raceme up to 1 cm (0.39 in) long, occasionally on short branches near the end of stems and the pedicels 5–8 mm (0.20–0.31 in) long. The purple or mauve-pink flowers are pea-like, 4–8 mm (0.16–0.31 in) long, outer sepals free, 2–3 mm (0.079–0.118 in) long, wing sepals usually 6–8 mm (0.24–0.31 in) long and the lateral petals equal in length as the yellow-tipped keel. Flowering occurs from November to January and the fruit is a flattened, elongated capsule 9–12 mm (0.35–0.47 in) long.

== Taxonomy and naming ==
Comesperma retusum was first formally described in 1806 by Jacques Labillardière and the description was published in Novae Hollandiae Plantarum Specimen. The specific epithet (retusum) refers to the leaf apex.

== Distribution and habitat ==
Milkwort grows in bogs and swamps in montane, subalpine locations and occasionally coastal swamps in New South Wales, Queensland, Victoria, Tasmania and the Australian Capital Territory.
