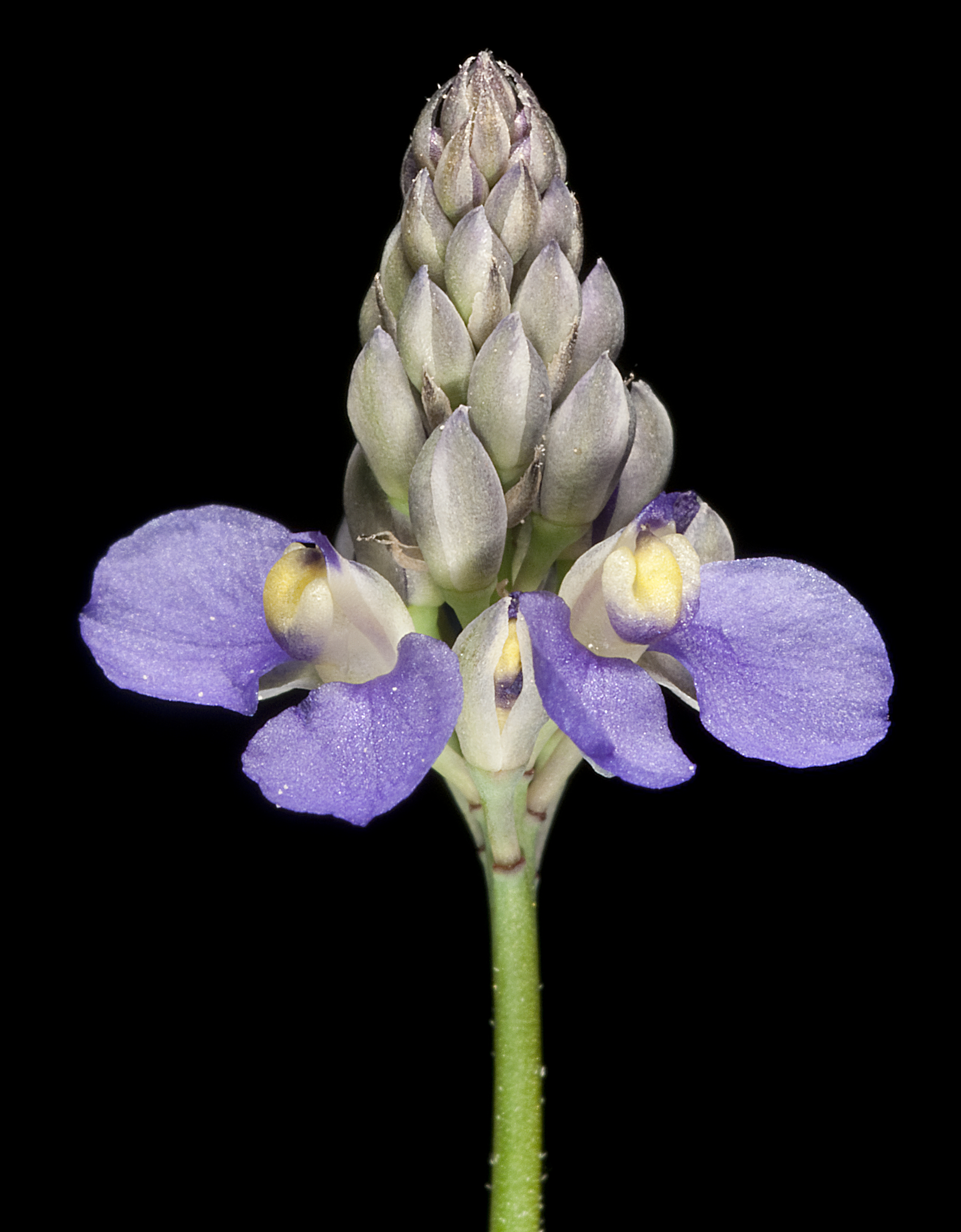

Scientific classification
- Kingdom: Plantae
- Clade: Tracheophytes
- Clade: Angiosperms
- Clade: Eudicots
- Clade: Rosids
- Order: Fabales
- Family: Polygalaceae
- Genus: Comesperma
- Species: C. calymega

Binomial name
- Comesperma calymega Labill.
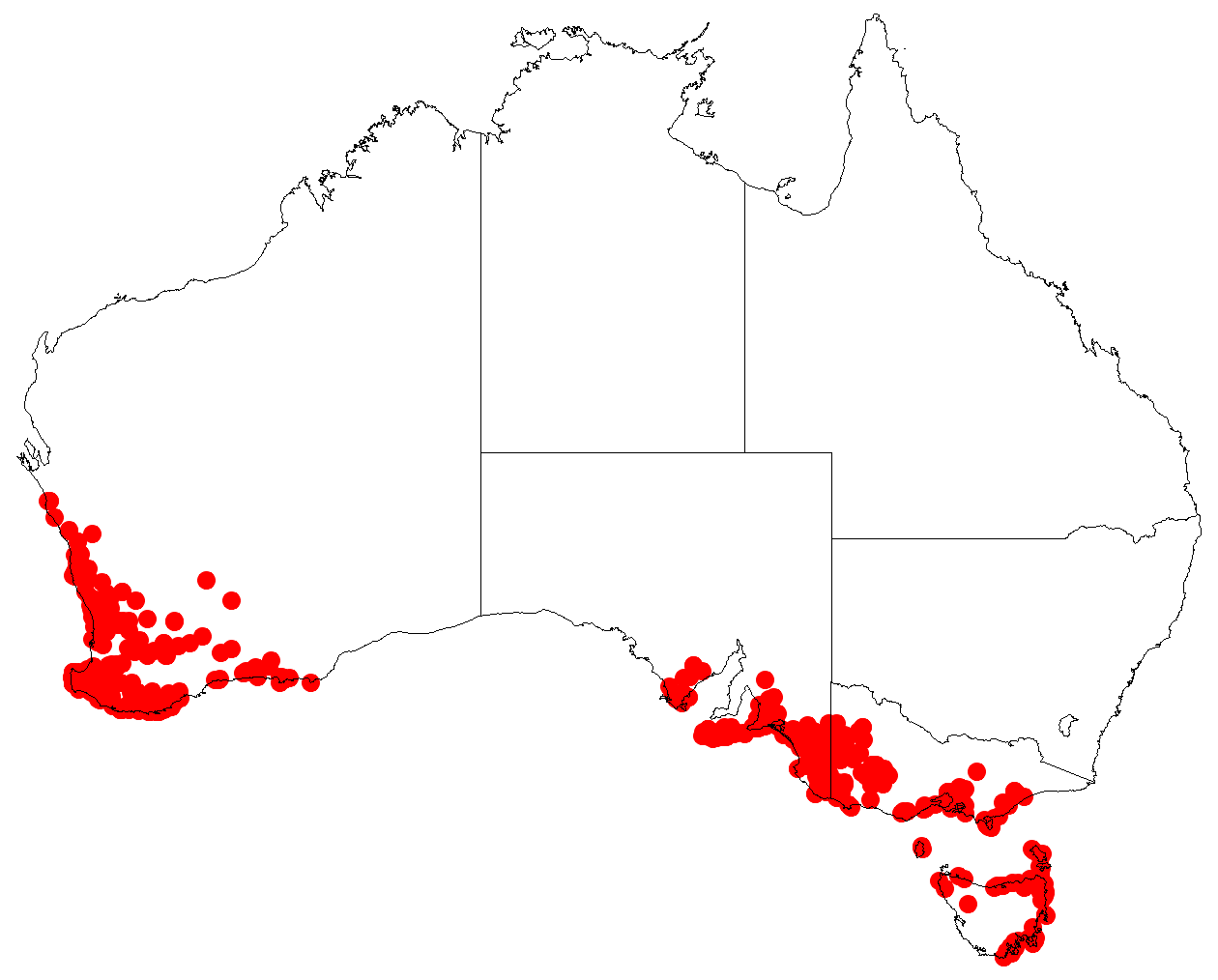
- Occurrence data from AVH

Synonyms
- Bredemeyera calymega (Labill.) Chodat; Comesperma calymega var. latifolium Benth. Comesperma calymega var. strictum (Endl.) Domin; Comesperma herbaceum Steud. Comesperma isocalyx Spreng. Comesperma parviflorum Steud. Comesperma spathulatum Turcz. Comesperma strictum Endl. Comesperma strictum var. latifolium Steetz; Comesperma tenue Steud. Comesperma varians Steud.

= Comesperma calymega =

Species of plant

Comesperma calymega, commonly known as blue-spike milkwort, is a slender herb in the family Polygalaceae. It is a perennial herb growing to between 10 cm and 50 cm high, from a short woody rhizome.

The species was first formally described by French botanist Jacques Labillardière in Novae Hollandiae Plantarum Specimen in 1806, from a specimen collected in Tasmania.

The species occurs in the states of South Australia, Tasmania, Victoria, and Western Australia.
