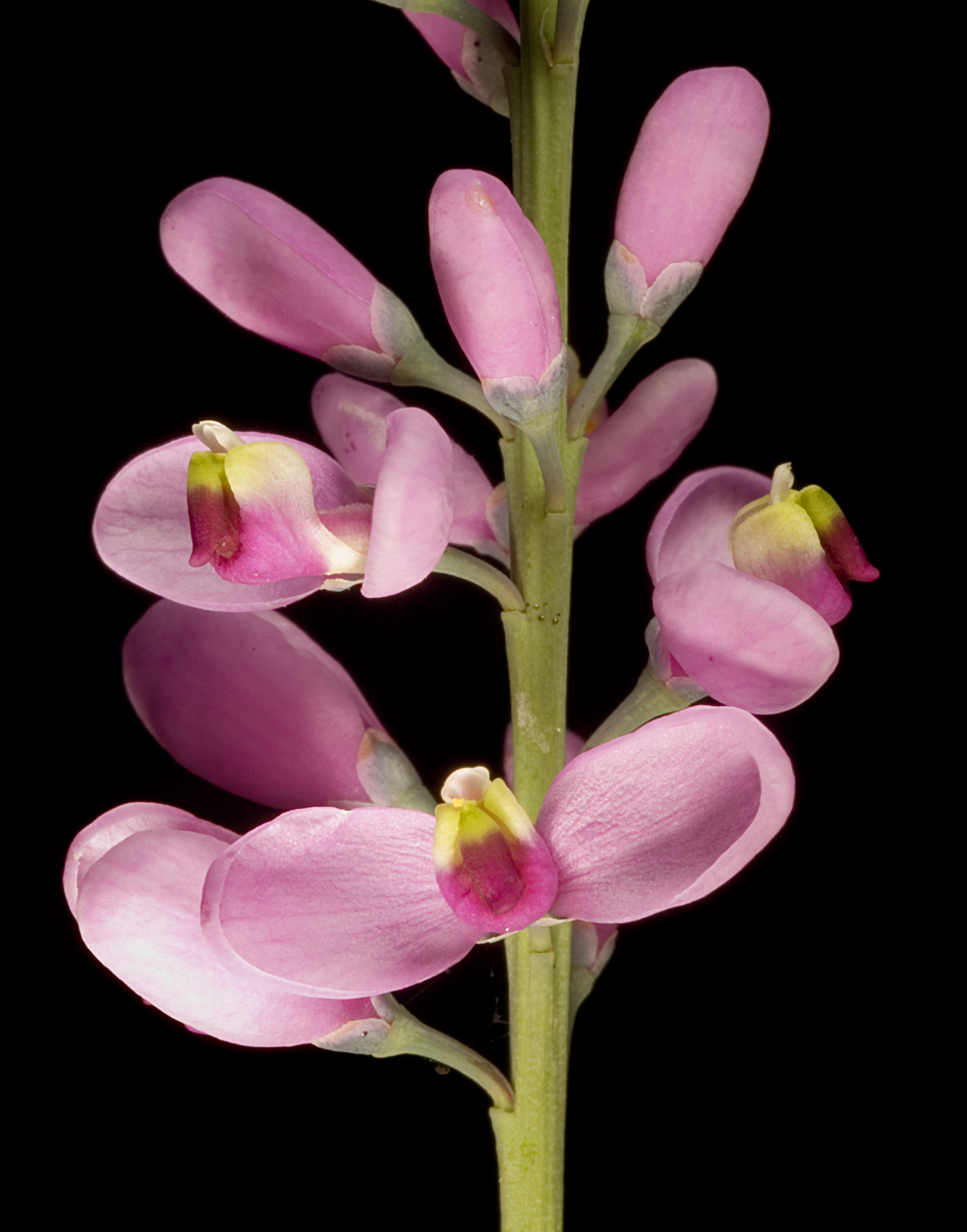

Scientific classification
- Kingdom: Plantae
- Clade: Tracheophytes
- Clade: Angiosperms
- Clade: Eudicots
- Clade: Rosids
- Order: Fabales
- Family: Polygalaceae
- Genus: Comesperma
- Species: C. virgatum

Binomial name
- Comesperma virgatum Labill.
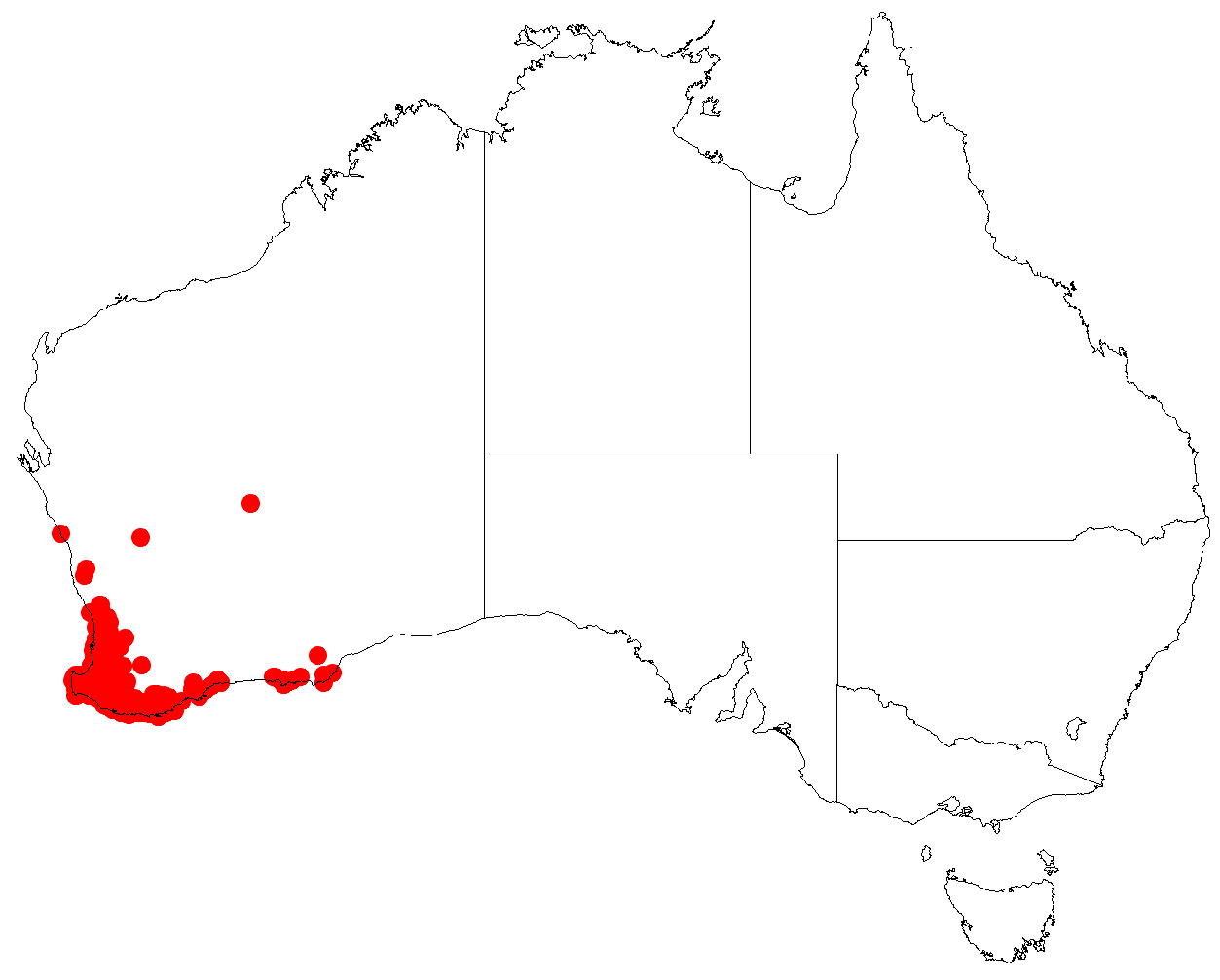
- Occurrence data from AVH

Synonyms
- List: Bredemeyera virgata (Labill.) Steenis Comesperma aemulum Steud. Comesperma contractum Steud. Comesperma corniculatum Steud. Comesperma laxiusculum Steud. Comesperma longibracteatum Steud. Comesperma roseum Steud. Comesperma selaginoides Turcz. Comesperma simplex Endl. Comesperma virgatum var. contractum (Steud.) Steetz Comesperma virgatum var. corniculatum (Steud.) Domin Comesperma virgatum var. longibracteatum (Steud.) Steetz Comesperma virgatum var. simplex (Endl.) Steetz

= Comesperma virgatum =

Species of plant

Comesperma virgatum, commonly known as milkwort, is a herb in the family Polygalaceae. It is an erect slender herb growing to between 30 cm and 1.6 m high, on sandy and lateritic soils, and sometimes in swampy conditions. Its pink to purple flowers may be seen from September to December or January to March.

The species was first formally described by French botanist Jacques Labillardière in Novae Hollandiae Plantarum Specimen in 1806, from a specimen collected in Van Leuwin's Land.

The species occurs in Western Australia.
