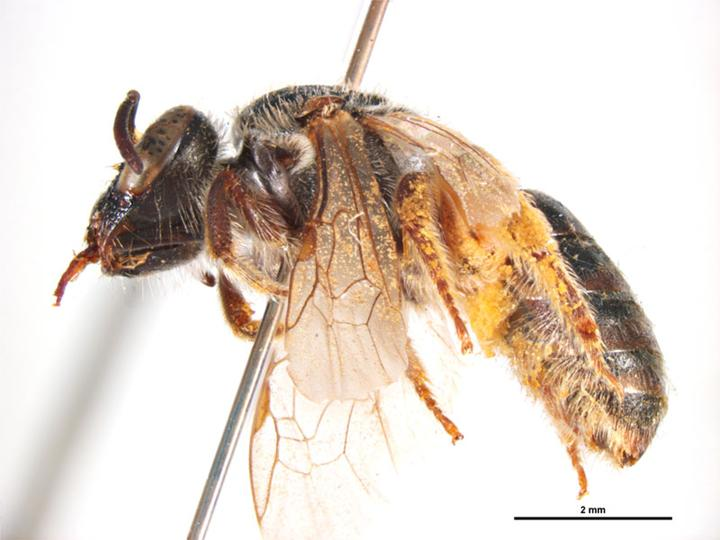
- Female

Scientific classification
- Kingdom: Animalia
- Phylum: Arthropoda
- Clade: Pancrustacea
- Class: Insecta
- Order: Hymenoptera
- Family: Halictidae
- Genus: Lasioglossum
- Species: L. orbatum

Binomial name
- Lasioglossum orbatum Smith, 1853

Synonyms
- Halictus orbatus Smith, 1853; Halictus franki Friese, 1924; Halictus viridarii Cockerell, 1930

= Lasioglossum orbatum =

Species of bee

Lasioglossum orbatum, or Lasioglossum (Chilalictus) orbatum, is a species of bee in the family Halictidae and subfamily Halictinae. It is endemic to Australia. It was described by English entomologist Frederick Smith in 1853.

== Distribution and habitat ==
The species occurs in south-eastern Australia. Type localities include the Lamington National Park in south-east Queensland.

== Behaviour ==
The adults are flying mellivores. Flowering plants visited by the bees include Acacia, Aotus, Bossiaea, Bursaria, Comesperma, Daviesia, Dillwynia, Eucalyptus, Helipterum, Hypochaeris, Jacksonia, Leptospermum, Leucopogon, Medicago, Olearia, Pultenaea, Senecio, Swainsona, Tetratheca, Trifolium, Verbena, Wahlenbergia and Watsonia species.

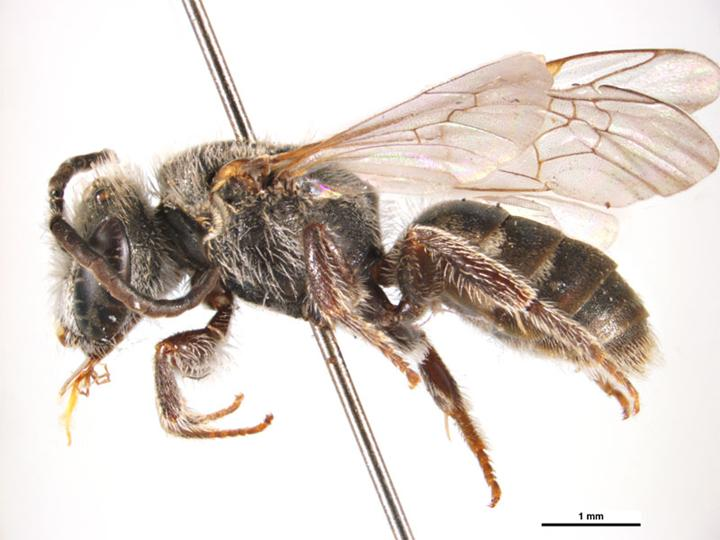
Male
