= Edward Duyker =

Australian historian, biographer and author (born 1955)

Edward Duyker FAHA
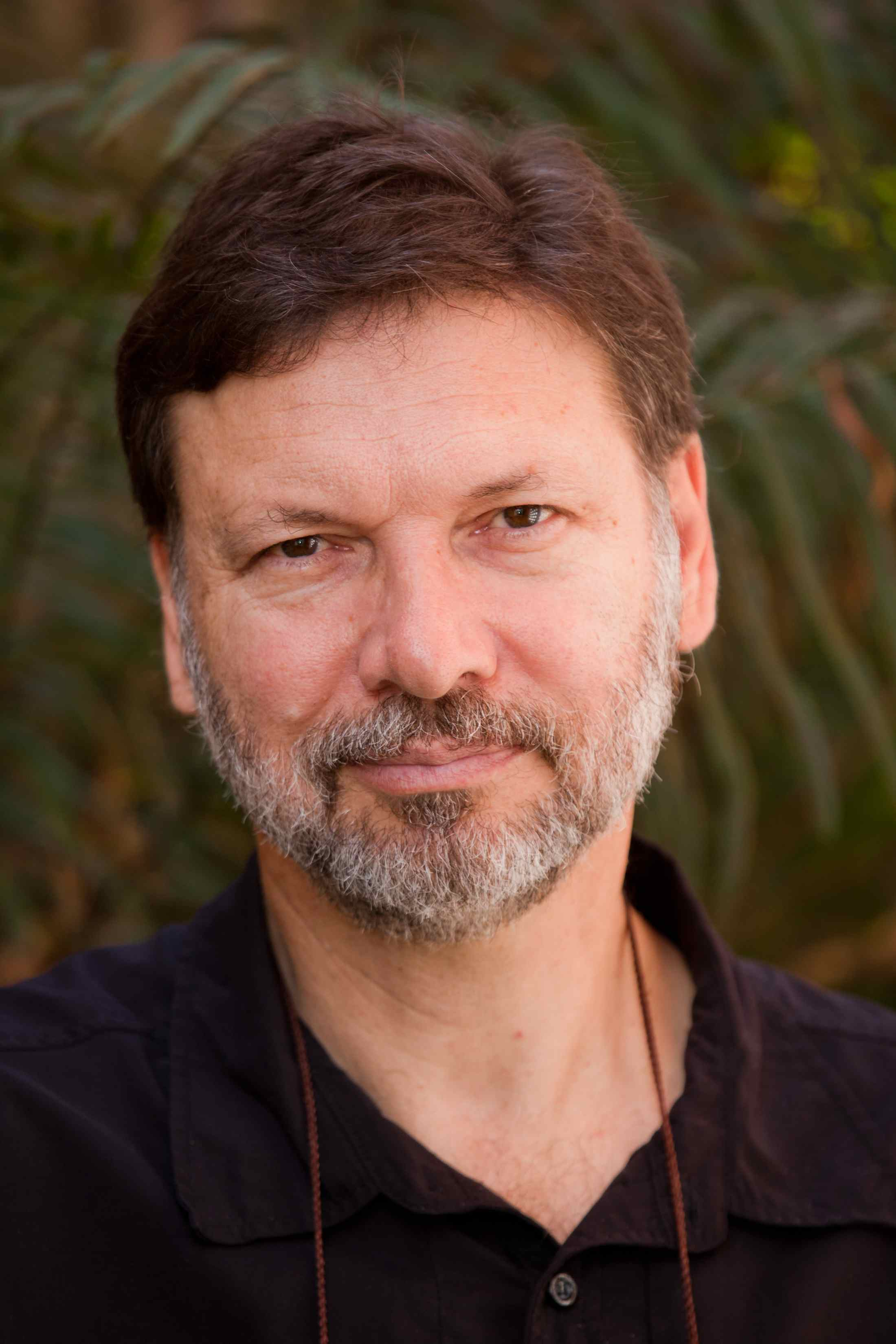
- Edward Duyker (2014)
- Born: 21 March 1955 (age 71); Melbourne, Victoria
- Occupation: Historian

Edward Duyker FAHA (born 21 March 1955) is an Australian historian, biographer and author born in Melbourne.

Edward Duyker's books include several ethno-histories – Tribal Guerrillas (1987), The Dutch in Australia (1987) and Of the Star and the Key: Mauritius, Mauritians and Australia (1988) – and numerous books dealing with early Australian exploration and natural science, among them biographies of Daniel Solander, Marc-Joseph Marion Dufresne, Jacques Labillardière, François Péron and Jules Dumont d'Urville.

== Personal and early life ==
Edward Duyker was born to a father from the Netherlands and a mother from Mauritius. His mother has ancestors from Cornwall who emigrated to Adelaide, South Australia, in 1849, and he is related to the Australian landscape painter Lloyd Rees. He is also related to the French painter Félix Lionnet and shares eighteenth-century maternal ancestors with the writer Marcel Pagnol. Duyker attended St Joseph's School, Malvern, Victoria, and completed his secondary studies at De La Salle College, Malvern. He gave evidence about those years to the Royal Commission into Institutional Responses to Child Sexual Abuse.

After undergraduate studies at La Trobe University, he was a doctoral candidate at the University of Melbourne (where he also studied Bengali language), and was supervised by the Indian philosopher Sibnarayan Ray. He received his PhD in 1981 for a thesis on the participation of the tribal Santals in the Naxalite–Maoist insurgency in India. In the course of field-research in West Bengal, he lost 20 kilograms in weight through dysentery and malnutrition – an ordeal he recounted in article "The Word in the Field".

== Career ==
After working as a spot welder at General Motors Holden in Dandenong and an RSPCA ambulance driver, Duyker was recruited by the Australian Department of Defence in Canberra in early 1981 and eventually worked in the Joint Intelligence Organization. He left in July 1983 to take up a position as a Teaching Fellow at Griffith University, Brisbane, but ultimately settled in Sydney as a full-time author in 1984.

Using the Dutch and French linguistic resources of his family, he edited The Discovery of Tasmania (1992) which brought together all known journal extracts from the first two European expeditions to Van Diemen's Land. An Officer of the Blue (1994), Duyker's biography of the explorer Marc-Joseph Marion Dufresne was the subject of an essay, "The Tortoise Wins Again!", by Greg Dening, published in his collection Readings/Writings.

Nature's Argonaut (1998), Edward Duyker's biography of Daniel Solander the naturalist on HM Bark Endeavour and the first Swede to circle the globe, was shortlisted for the New South Wales Premier's History Awards in 1999. Duyker is also the co-editor, with Per Tingbrand, of Daniel Solander: Collected Correspondence 1753–1782 (1995), With his mother Maryse Duyker he published the first English translation of the journal of the explorer Bruny d'Entrecasteaux in 2001. It has become an important Western Australian and Tasmanian historical source and, with its annotations and introduction, informed public debate regarding the heritage-listing of Recherche Bay in Tasmania. Citizen Labillardière (2003), Duyker's biography of the naturalist Jacques Labillardière, won the General History Prize among the New South Wales Premier's History Awards.

With former Australian Greens Senator Bob Brown, archaeologist John Mulvaney and broadcaster Peter Cundall, Duyker was an outspoken campaigner for the protection of Recherche Bay from logging.

François Péron: An Impetuous Life (2006), Duyker's biography of the zoologist of the expedition of Nicolas-Thomas Baudin to Australian waters (1800—1803), won the Frank Broeze Maritime History Prize in 2007.

In 2007 Edward Duyker published A Dictionary of Sea Quotations with a deeply personal introduction on his family's links with the sea.

Duyker's biographies of naturalists are largely conventional linear narratives, but they are characterised by meticulous research and great attention to detail – "written with verve, but fortified with awesome scholarship" as Dymphna Clark put it in her review of Nature's Argonaut. He makes a point of visiting the places he writes about and orienting explorers' maps and journals to a modern landscape or coast.

Thomas Nossiter of the London School of Economics praised Duyker's Tribal Guerrillas because "it exemplifies the value of synthesising anthropology and history; and, more generally, it is a scholarly contribution to a literature on tribal rebellion and insurgency far wider than India, which embraces Greece, Vietnam and Algeria as well as sub-Saharan Africa where tribal responses to imperialism and modernisation have been significant". This meeting ground between history and anthropology can also be seen in An Officer of the Blue, Duyker's biography of Marc-Joseph Marion Dufresne, in which he skilfully used missionary and other accounts of Māori oral history and French journals to explain the circumstances of the explorer's death in New Zealand's Bay of Islands in 1772. Prof. Barrie Macdonald of Massey University described it as "a fine piece of detective work – a biography written with an empathy with its subject yet a critical eye that helps set in context a death that still has its significance in New Zealand history."

Since 1985, Duyker has written more than 90 entries for the bilingual Dictionnaire de Biographie Mauricienne/Dictionary of Mauritian Biography published on his mother's native island. In November 2017, he was made an honorary member of the Société d'Histoire de l'Ile Maurice, in recognition of these contributions and for his books on the history of the Mauritians in Australia, Mauritian Heritage and Of the Star and the Key. Duyker has also written a number of pioneering monographs on the Dutch in Australia, and co-authored Molly and the Rajah (1991) the life of Esme Mary Fink, an Australian woman who married the Rajah of Pudukottai, India, in 1915. He also edited A Woman on the Goldfields (1995), dealing with the life of Emily Skinner on the nineteenth-century Victorian gold fields.

== Academic career ==
Duyker was a Teaching Fellow at Griffith University, in Brisbane, in 1983. Between 2001 and 2022, he was an honorary senior lecturer in the School of Languages and Cultures at the University of Sydney. Between 2009 and 2018, he was an adjunct and then an honorary professor of the Australian Catholic University. In 2007, Duyker was elected a Fellow of the Australian Academy of the Humanities.

== Other positions ==
Between 1996 and 2002 he served as the honorary consul of the Republic of Mauritius in New South Wales. Duyker is a member of the International Council of Museums and a life member of the Sutherland Shire Historical Society.

== Critical responses ==
Duyker's writings span a diverse range of subjects and disciplines. In many respects he has built his readership on his eclectic interests and made a strength of them. Greg Dening once described him as "an historian's historian".

Marius Damas, in his book, Approaching Naxalbari (Radical Impression, Calcutta, 1991, p. 68) commented that "Duyker brings both historical and anthropological tools into play ... Drawing on a wide range of historical and contemporary sources, including personal interviews ... [and] provides us with a richly detailed account."

Reviewing An Officer of the Blue, Michael Roe (historian) wrote: "In building his story, Duyker has to confront matters of war, politics, geography, navigation, anthropology – the list could continue. He does so with constant skill and authority."

In 1995 Paul Brunton described Duyker's (and Per Tingbrand's) Daniel Solander: Collected Correspondence (1995) as "a major contribution to textual scholarship".

In 2006, Arthur Lucas, former principal of King's College London, wrote that Citizen Labillardière was an "exceptionally readable, richly textured work ... The life Duyker recreates is as rich as that of the hero of any adventure novel, and the context is insightful history, not just the history of an important natural historian".

Duyker's biography of French explorer Jules Sébastien César Dumont d'Urville was shortlisted and a runner-up for the 2015 Frank Broeze Maritime History Prize. One of the judges wrote that it was "a thoroughly and meticulously prepared history of one of the giants of French voyaging". Another judge described it as a "monumental work". In 2022, the French edition received one of five medals awarded by the Académie de Marine, France's naval academy.

== Honours ==
- 2000 Chevalier de l'Ordre des Palmes Académiques, France.
- 2003 Centenary Medal, Australia.
- 2004 Medal of the Order of Australia
- 2022 Médaille de l'Académie de Marine, France.

== Bibliography ==
- Duyker, Edward (1984). A guide to Mauritian genealogical sources in Australia. Forest Hill: Australian Mauritian Research Group.
- — (1985). A guide to Mauritian genealogical sources in Australia (Second ed.). Ferntree Gully: Australian Mauritian Research Group.
- —, ed. (1986). Mauritian heritage : an anthology of the Lionnet, Commins and related families. Ferntree Gully: Australian Mauritian Research Group.[Highly commended, Alexander Henderson Awards, 1986]
- — (1987). Tribal guerrillas : the Santals of West Bengal and the Naxalite movement. New Delhi: Oxford University Press.
- — (1987). The Dutch in Australia. Melbourne: AE Press.
- Early Dutch Immigrant Naturalizations: An Alphabetical Index 1849—1903, Volume 1: Victoria, New South Wales & Queensland, Privately Published, Sylvania (NSW), 1987, pp. 26, ISBN 0-7316-0057-6.
- (With Maryse Duyker) Beyond the Dunes: A Dutch-Australian Story, Privately Published, Sylvania, 1987, pp. 41, ISBN 0-7316-0058-4.
- Netherlandish Family History Sources in Australia: An Annotated Bibliography, Privately Published, Sylvania (NSW), 1988, pp. 22, ISBN 0-9587981-0-9.
- Of the Star and the Key: Mauritius, Mauritians and Australia, Australian Mauritian Research Group, Sylvania, 1988, pp. 129, ISBN 0-9590883-4-2.
- (With Coralie Younger) Molly and the Rajah: Race, Romance and the Raj, Australian Mauritian Press, Sylvania, 1991, pp. xii, 130, ISBN 0-646-03679-3 [spoken word version: Hear a Book, Hobart, 2 track mono, 1993, abn 91 356351].
- (ed.) The Discovery of Tasmania: Journal Extracts from the Expeditions of Abel Janszoon Tasman and Marc-Joseph Marion Dufresne 1642 & 1772, St David's Park Publishing/Tasmanian Government Printing Office, Hobart, 1992, pp. 106, ISBN 0-7246-2241-1.
- A French Trading Expedition to the Orient: The Voyage of the Montaran 1753—1756, Stockholm University Center for Pacific Asia Studies Working Paper, No.30, August 1992, pp. 20.
- New Voices in the Southland: Multiculturalism, Ethno-history and Asian Studies in Australia, Stockholm University Center for Pacific Asia Studies Working Paper No.31, September 1992, pp. 15.
- (with Hendrik Kolenberg et al.) The Second Landing: Dutch Migrant Artists in Australia, Erasmus Foundation, Melbourne, 1993, pp. 56, ISBN 0-646-13593-7.
- An Officer of the Blue: Marc-Joseph Marion Dufresne 1724—1772, South Sea Explorer, Miegunyah/Melbourne University Press, Melbourne, 1994, pp. 229, ISBN 0-522-84565-7.
- (with Barry York) Exclusions and Admissions: The Dutch in Australia 1902–1946, Studies in Australian Ethnic History, No. 7, Centre for Immigration and Multicultural Studies, Research School of Social Sciences, Australian National University, Canberra, 1994, pp. 11, ISBN 07315 1913 2/ISSN 1039-3188.
- (with Per Tingbrand, ed. & trans) Daniel Solander: Collected Correspondence 1753—1782, Miegunyah/Melbourne University Press, Melbourne, 1995, pp. 466, ISBN 0-522-84636-X [Scandinavian University Press, Oslo, 1995 ISBN 82-00-22454-6].
- (ed.) A Woman on the Goldfields: Recollections of Emily Skinner 1854—1878, Melbourne University Press, Melbourne, 1995, pp. 129, ISBN 0-522-84652-1. [RVIB, Melbourne, 2001, Spoken word version narrated by Ronnie Evans, one of 100 titles recorded by the Royal Victorian Institute for the Blind National Information Library Service in digital audio format for the Australians All project, funded by the National Council for the Centenary of Federation.]
- Nature's Argonaut: Daniel Solander 1733—1782, Naturalist and Voyager with Cook and Banks, Miegunyah/Melbourne University Press, Melbourne, 1998 (reprinted 1999), pp. 380, ISBN 0-522-84753-6 [Short-listed, New South Wales Premier's General History Prize, 1999]
- [Introductory essay & biographical note] Mirror of the Australian Navigation by Jacob Le Maire: A Facsimile of the 'Spieghel der Australische Navigatie ...' Being an Account of the Voyage of Jacob Le Maire and Willem Schouten 1615–1616 published in Amsterdam in 1622, Hordern House for the Australian National Maritime Museum, Sydney, 1999, pp. 202, ISBN 1-875567-25-9.
- (with Maryse Duyker, ed. & trans) Bruny d'Entrecasteaux: Voyage to Australia and the Pacific 1791—1793, Miegunyah/Melbourne University Press, Melbourne, 2001, pp. xliii, pp. 392, ISBN 0-522-84932-6 [paperback edition, March 2006, ISBN 0-522-85232-7].
- Citizen Labillardière: A Naturalist's Life in Revolution and Exploration (1755—1834), Miegunyah/Melbourne University Press, Melbourne, 2003, ISBN 0-522-85010-3, Paperback reprint, 2004, ISBN 0-522-85160-6, pp. 383 (including notes, glossaries, zoological, botanical and general index), 12 maps, 18 black and white plates [Winner, New South Wales Premier's General History Prize, 2004].
- François Péron: An Impetuous Life: Naturalist and Voyager, Miegunyah/Melbourne University Press, Melbourne, 2006, pp. 349, ISBN 978-0-522-85260-8 [winner Frank Broeze Maritime History Prize, 2007].
- (ed. & compiler) A Dictionary of Sea Quotations: From Ancient Egypt to the Present, Miegunyah/Melbourne University Press, Melbourne, 2007, pp. 439, ISBN 0-522-85371-4.
- Marc-Joseph Marion Dufresne, un marin malouin à la découvertes des mers australes, traduction française de Maryse Duyker (avec l'assistance de Maurice Recq et l'auteur), Les Portes du Large, Rennes, 2010, pp. 352, ISBN 978-2-914612-14-2.
- Père Receveur: Franciscan, Scientist and Voyager with Lapérouse, Dharawal Publications, Engadine (NSW), 2011, pp. 41, ISBN 978-0-9870727-0-2.
- Dumont d'Urville: Explorer and Polymath, Otago University Press, Dunedin, 2014, pp. 671, ISBN 978 1 877578 70 0, University of Hawai'i Press, Honolulu, 2015, ISBN 9780824851392.
- Dumont d'Urville: L'homme et la mer, traduction, revision et adaption par Maryse Duyker, Anne Kehrig et Edward Duyker, Éditions CTHS [Comité des Travaux historiques et scientifiques], Paris, 2021, pp. 600, ISBN 2735509338.
- Horace Street Green: A Personal Past, Sylvania, NSW, 2023, s. 230, ISBN 978-0-6484209-0-3, [Commendation, 2023 Victorian Community History Awards].

== Selected chapters and articles ==
- ‘Land Use and Ecological Change in Central NSW’, Journal of the Royal Australian Historical Society, vol. 69, part 2, September 1983, pp. 120–132.
- ‘History and Anthropology’, Man in India, vol 64, no. 1, March 1984, pp. 74–81.
- ‘Insurgency and the Tribal Mind: West Bengal's Santal's and the Naxalite Movement’, Asian and African Studies, vol . 18, no. 2, July 1984, pp. 137–159
- ‘The Evolution of Israel's Defence Industries’, Defence Force Journal, ISSN 0314-1039, no. 38, January–February 1983, pp. 44–61.
- ‘Daughters of Deborah: Women in Israel's Military’ Part I, The Australian Rationalist Quarterly, ISSN 0159-6462, no. 20, December 1984, pp. 17–20; part II, ‘Post Independence and Conscription’, no. 21, March 1985, pp. 8–12.
- The Kashmir Conflict: An Historical Review’, The Indian Ocean Review, ISSN 1031-2331, vol. 3, no. 4, December 1990, pp. 1–6.
- ‘Uncovering Jean Piron: In Search of d’Entrecasteaux's Artist’, Explorations, December 2005 (issued June 2006), pp. 37–45.
- ‘Girardin, Louise (1754–1794)’, Australian Dictionary of Biography, Supplement 1580–1980, pp. 144–5.
- "The Mauritians", in Jupp, J. (ed.) The Australian People, Angus & Robertson, Sydney, 1988, pp. 709–713; revised edition, Cambridge University Press, Cambridge, 2001, pp. 592–597.
- "The Mauritians in Australia", The Australian Encyclopaedia, 5th edition, Australian Geographic, Sydney, 1988, vol. 5, pp. 1900–1902.
- "Histoire généalogique: Mauritius and Family History at the National Library", National Library of Australia News, vol. IV, no. 1, October 1993, pp. 4–6.
- "Going Dutch at the National Library", National Library of Australia News, vol. IV, no. 4, January 1994, pp 3–5.
- — (November 1998). "Gallifrey and beyond : Doctor Who at the National Library". National Library of Australia News. IX (2): 11–13. Archived from the original on 20 January 2012.
- — (December 1998). "On Labillardière's alpine trail". National Library of Australia News. IX (3): 14–18. Archived from the original on 20 January 2012.
- — (October 2001). "The word in French". National Library of Australia News. XII (1): 7–10. Archived from the original on 20 January 2012.
- — (March 2002). "Eavesdropping on the past". National Library of Australia News. XII (6): 16–18. Archived from the original on 20 January 2012.
- "A French Garden in Tasmania: The Legacy of Félix Delahaye (1767—1829)", in Glynnis M. Cropp, Noel R. Watts, Roger D. J. Collins and K. R. Howe (eds.) Pacific Journeys: Essays in Honour of John Dunmore, Victoria University Press, Wellington, 2005, pp. 21–35.
- "Isle de France and Baudin's Precursors in Australian Waters", in Rivière, M. S. & Issur, K. R. (ed.) Baudin–Flinders dans l'Océan Indien: Voyages, découvertes, rencontre: Travels, Discoveries, Encounter: Actes du colloque international organisé par l'Université de Maurice, octobre 2003, L'Harmattan, Paris, 2006, pp. 137–155.
- ‘Lloyd Rees: Artist and Teacher’, Arts: The Journal of the Sydney University Arts Association, ISSN 0066-8095, vol. 30, 2008, pp. 34–53.
- (with John Low) ‘A Church on Pulpit Hill: Unlocking a Blue Mountains Mystery’, Doryanthes, ISSN 1835-9817, vol. 2, no. 3, August 2009, pp. 33–6.
- ‘An Explorer's Books: The Library of Dumont d’Urville’, Explorations, ISSN 0815-6158, no. 49, part ii, December 2010, pp. 66¬–81.
- ‘Dumont d’Urville's Library: The Notarial Inventories’, Explorations, ISSN 0815-6158, no. 49, part ii, December 2010, pp. 82¬-121.
- ‘George Cookney (1799–1876): Colonial Architect’, Doryanthes, ISSN 1835-9817, vol. 4, no. 1, February 2011, pp. 14–19.
- ‘France's Military Dead in Australia: An Historical Survey’, The French Australian Review, ISSN 0815-6158, no. 56, Australian Winter, 2014, pp. 65–83.
- ‘Faire la lumière sur Jean Piron : sur les traces de l’artiste de d’Entrecasteaux’, Saint-Hubert d’Ardenne: Société régionale d’histoire, d’archéologie et de sauvegarde du patrimoine hubertin Bulletin semestriel 01-2017, No 9, pp. 14–22.
- ‘Revealing Receveur: A Portrait Beneath our Noses?’, French Australian Review, ISSN 0815-6158 n ° 71, Australian Summer 2021–2022, pp. 103–8.
- ‘A False Portrait of Lapérouse?’, French Australian Review, ISSN 0815-6158, no. 73, Australian Summer 2022–2023, pp. 159–163.
- ‘Lapérouse in Fiction: Apocrypha, Pantomime and Other Literature’, French Australian Review, ISSN 0815-6158, no. 80, Winter 2026 pp. 92–100.
