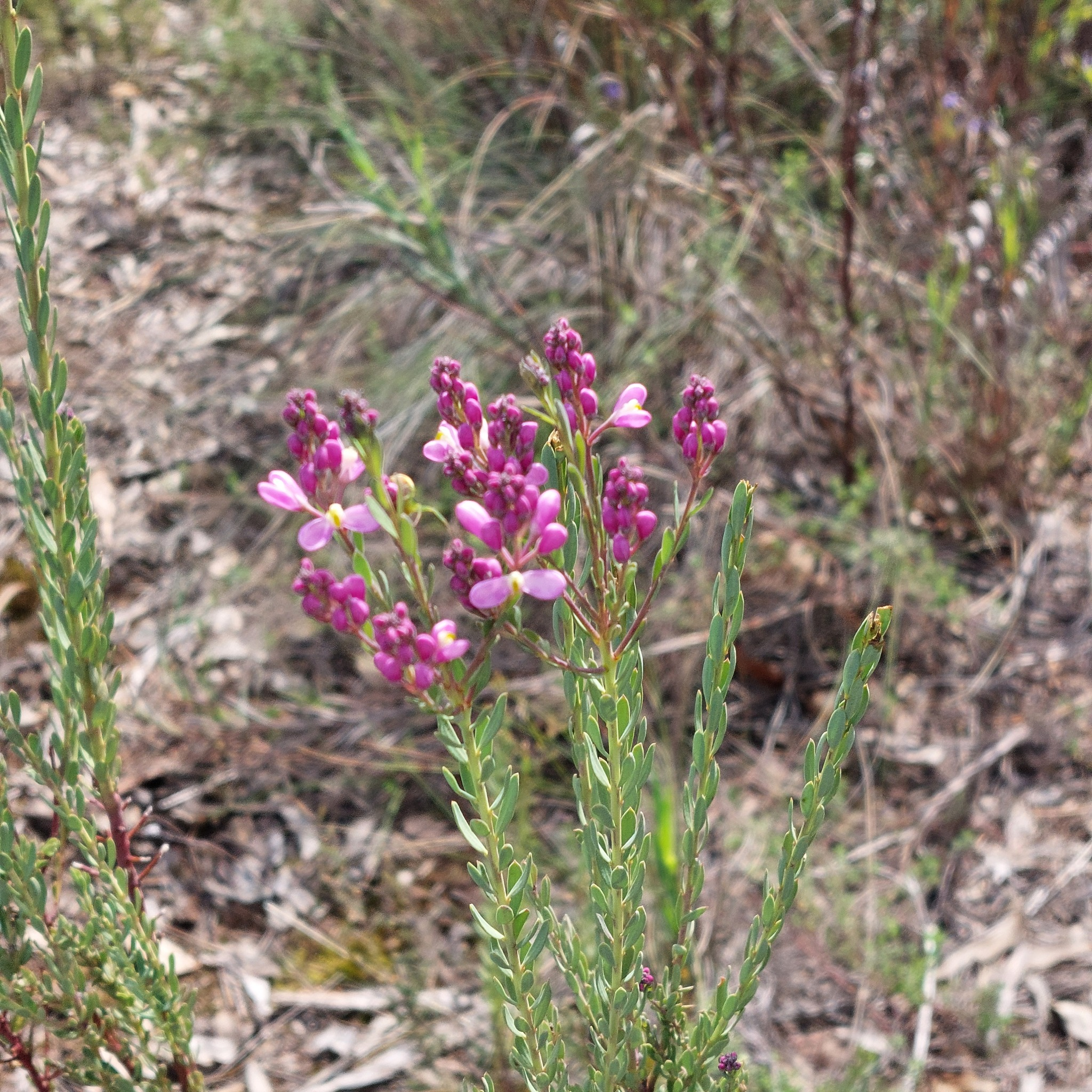
- (observed near Narrabri)

Scientific classification
- Kingdom: Plantae
- Clade: Tracheophytes
- Clade: Angiosperms
- Clade: Eudicots
- Clade: Rosids
- Order: Fabales
- Family: Polygalaceae
- Genus: Comesperma
- Species: C. sylvestre

Binomial name
- Comesperma sylvestre Lindl.
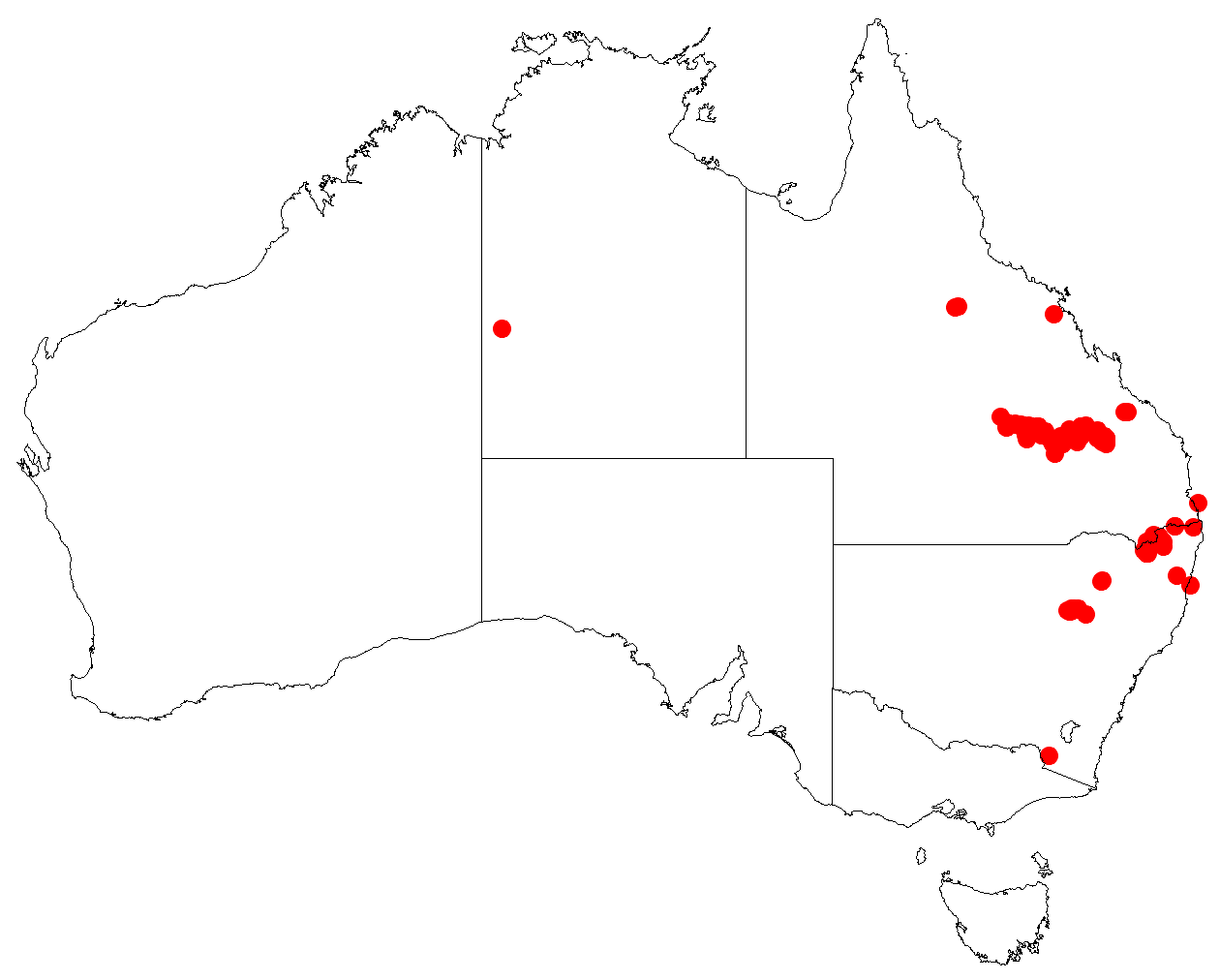
- Occurrence data from AVH

= Comesperma sylvestre =

Species of plant

Comesperma sylvestre is a shrub in the family Polygalaceae.

The species was first formally described in 1848 by the botanist John Lindley.

The species occurs in New South Wales, and Queensland.

== Description ==
Comesperma sylvestre is a sparsely branched shrub growing from 1 m to 3 m high. The outer sepals of the flowers are a quarter as long as the wing sepals which are from about 6 mm to 8 mm long.
