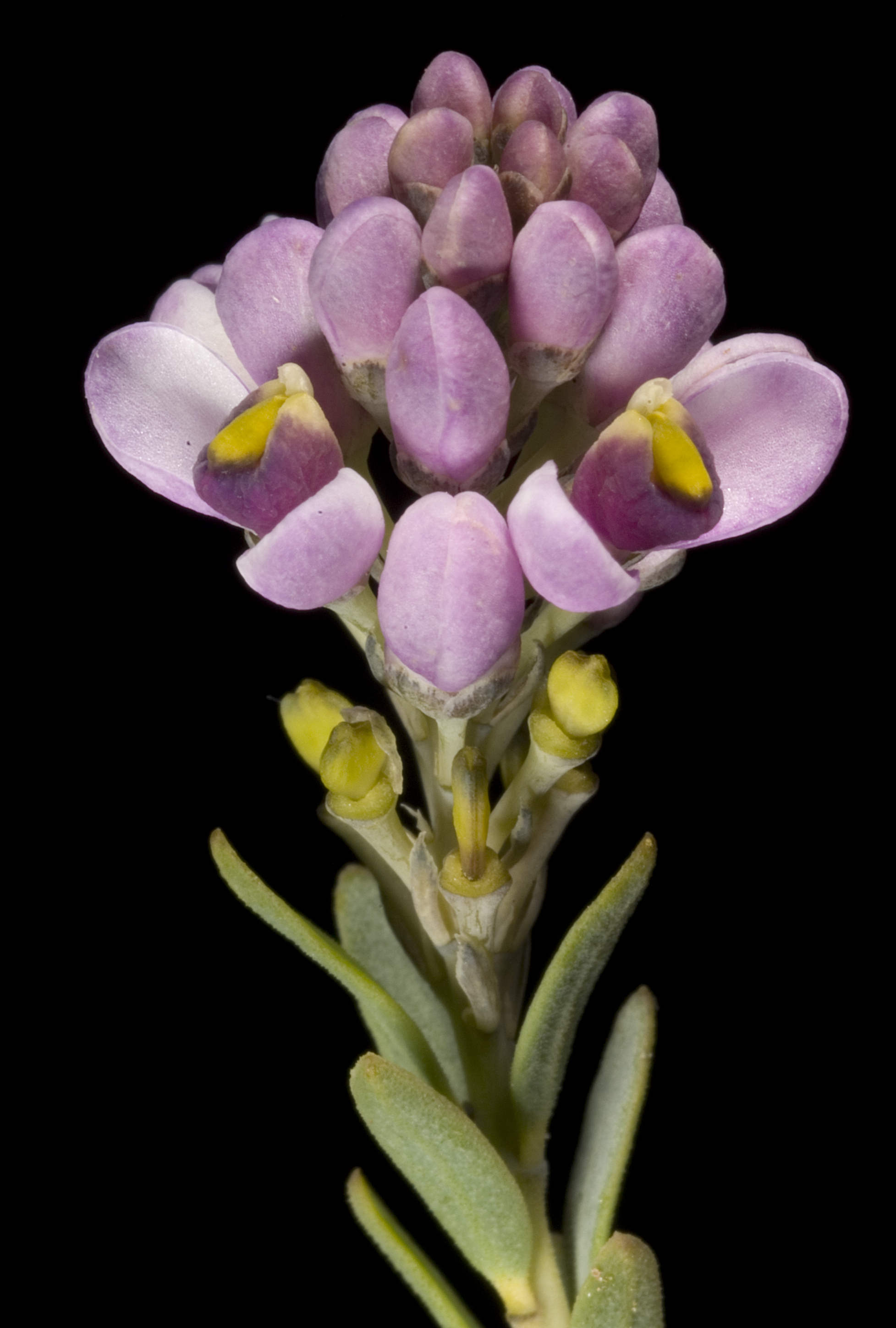

Scientific classification
- Kingdom: Plantae
- Clade: Tracheophytes
- Clade: Angiosperms
- Clade: Eudicots
- Clade: Rosids
- Order: Fabales
- Family: Polygalaceae
- Genus: Comesperma
- Species: C. drummondii

Binomial name
- Comesperma drummondii Steetz
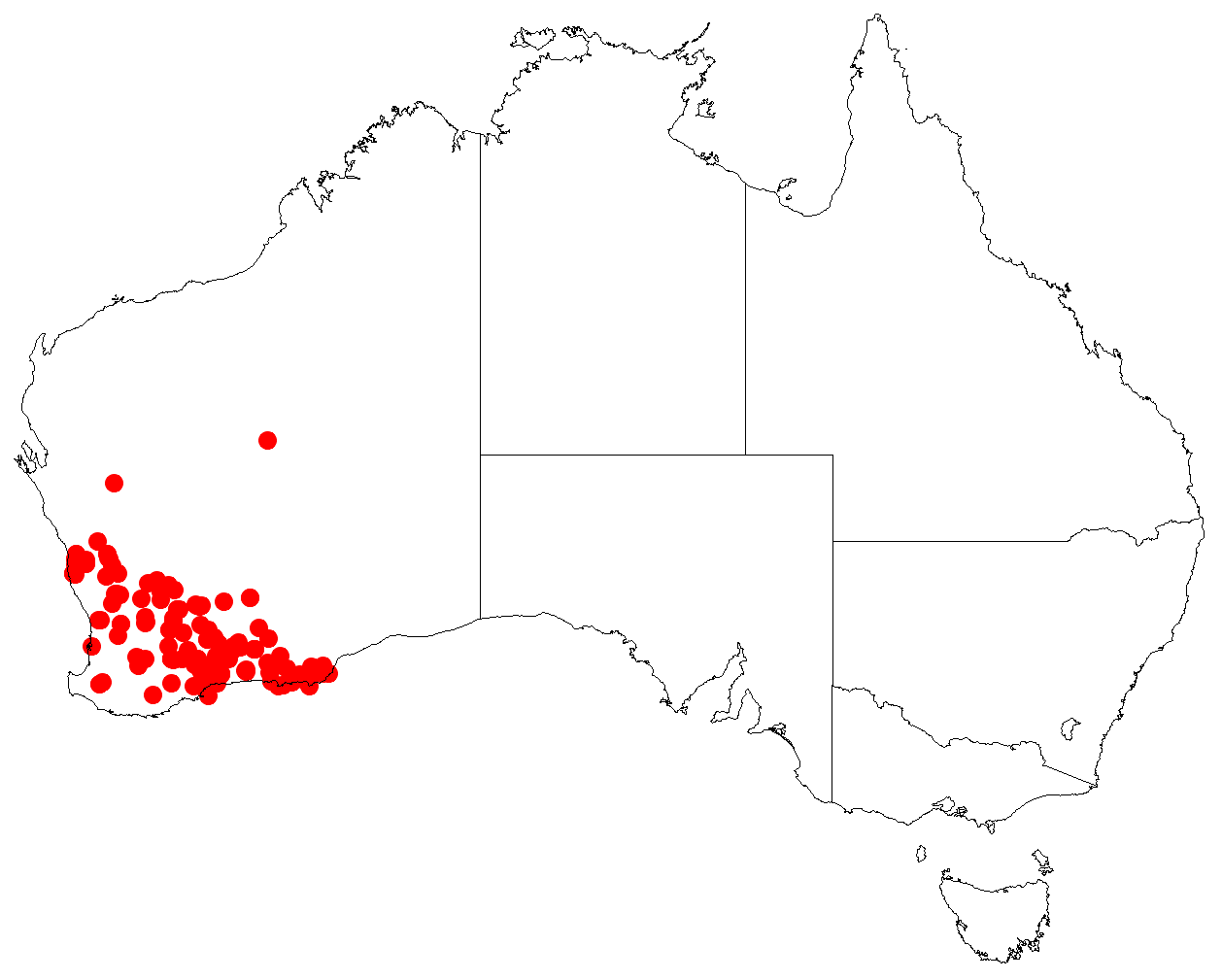
- Occurrence data from AVH

Synonyms
- Bredemeyera drummondii (Steetz) Steenis

= Comesperma drummondii =

Species of plant

Comesperma drummondii, commonly known as Drummond's milkwort, is a slender herb in the family Polygalaceae. It is a perennial herb growing to between 20 cm and 1.2 m high, on sandy and gravelly soils Its pink-blue-purple flowers may be seen from August to November.

The species was first formally described by the botanist Joachim Steetz in Plantae Preissianae in 1848.

The species occurs in Western Australia, in Beard's Eremaean and South-West provinces.
