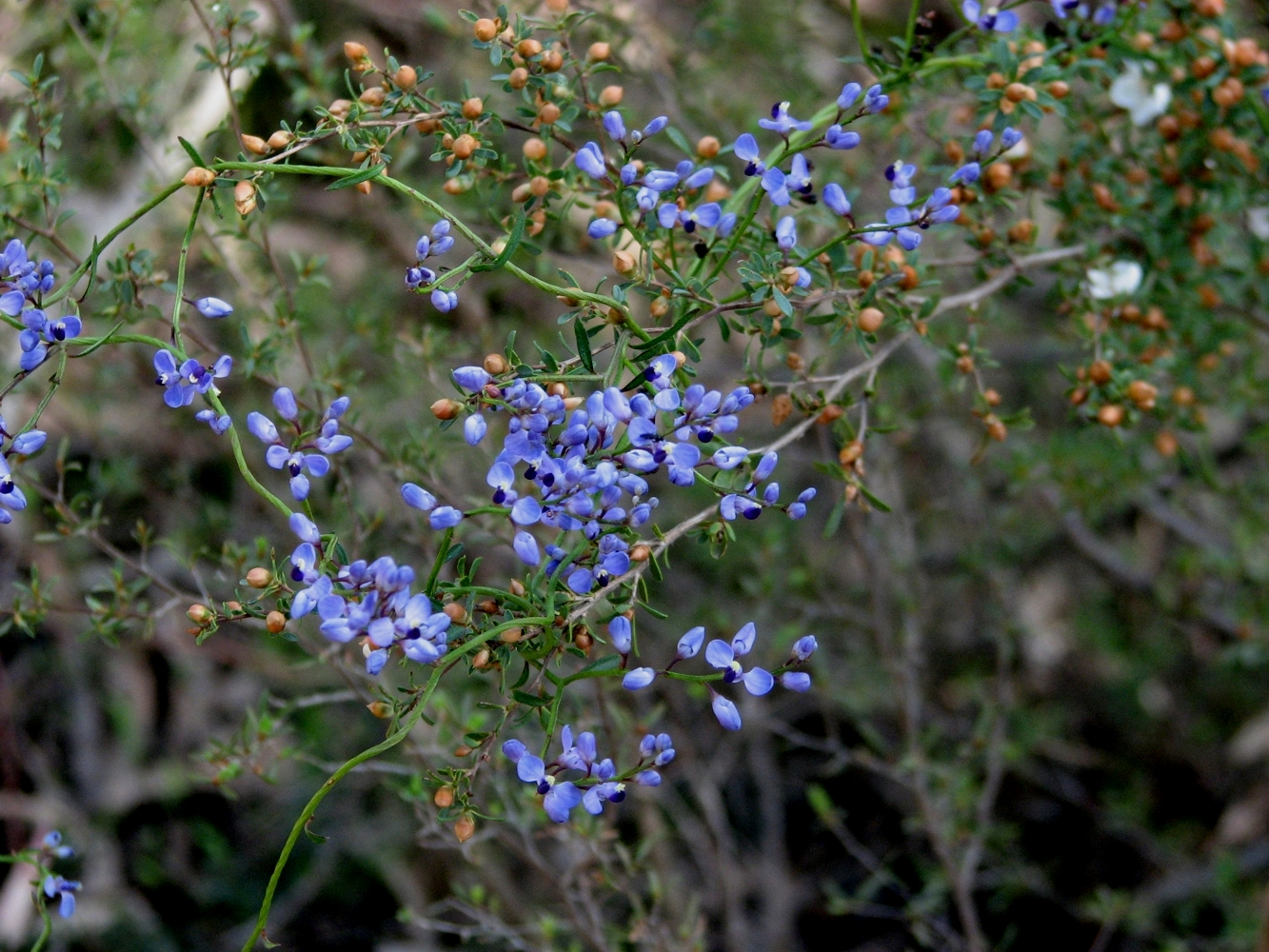

Scientific classification
- Kingdom: Plantae
- Clade: Tracheophytes
- Clade: Angiosperms
- Clade: Eudicots
- Clade: Rosids
- Order: Fabales
- Family: Polygalaceae
- Genus: Comesperma
- Species: C. volubile

Binomial name
- Comesperma volubile Labill.
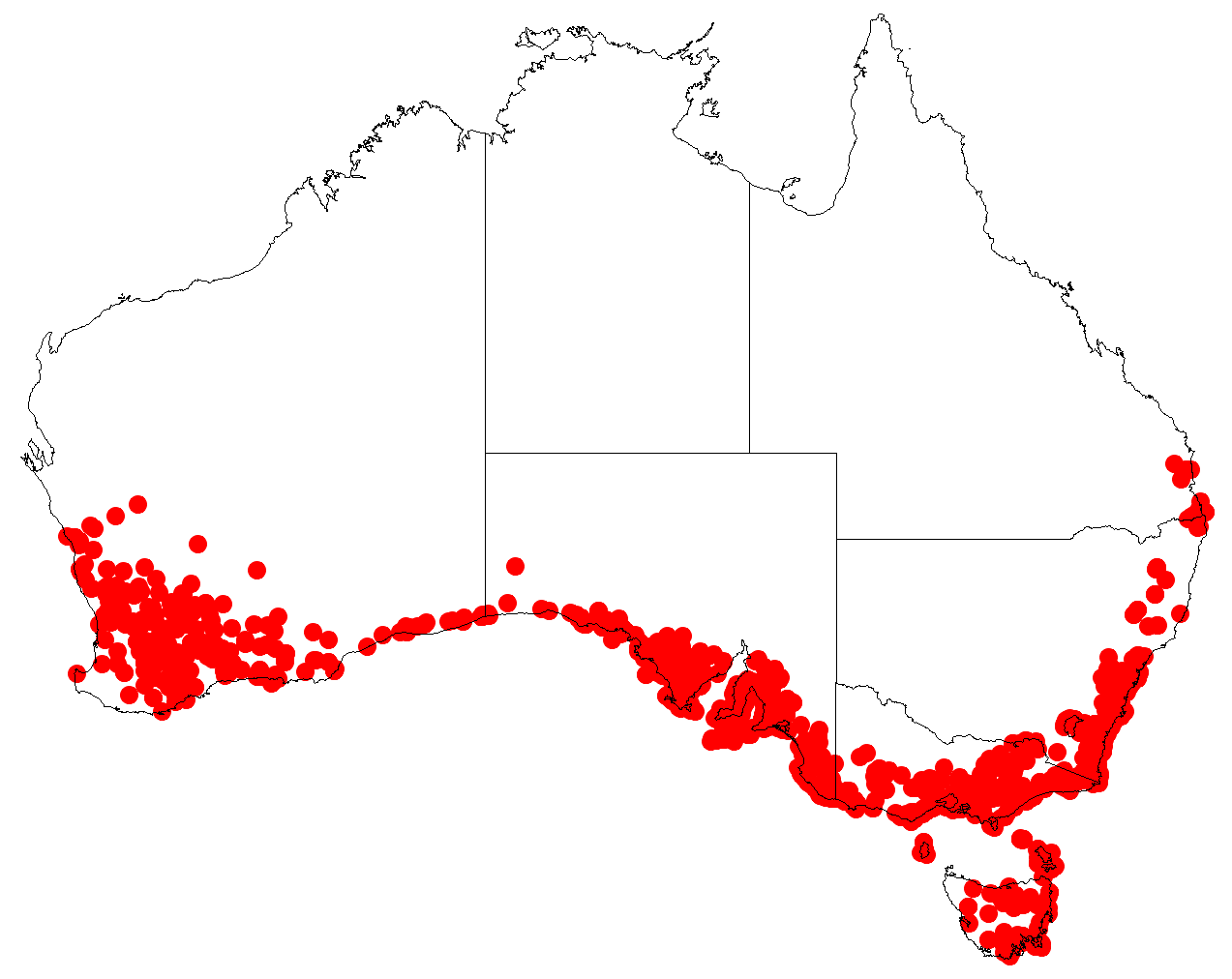
- Occurrence data from AVH

= Comesperma volubile =

Species of plant

Comesperma volubile, commonly known as love creeper, is a slender climber in the family Polygalaceae. It is a twining plant with linear leaves and pea-like blue flowers.

== Description ==
Comesperma voluble is a twining creeper to about 3 m (9.8 ft) high on rare occasion a small shrublet with smooth, angled stems. There are few leaves, linear to oval-shaped, 10–45 mm (0.39–1.77 in) long, 1.5–9 mm (0.059–0.354 in) wide, lower surface pale, margins curved or rolled under. The flowers are in lateral racemes 3–25 cm (1.2–9.8 in) long, the sepals are separated, outer three broadly oval-shaped, about 2 mm (0.079 in) long, wings oval-shaped to nearly orb-shaped, 4–7 mm (0.16–0.28 in) long, keel darker, 3.5–5 mm (0.14–0.20 in) long, upper petals egg-shaped to oblong. Flowering occurs mainly August to November and the fruit is a narrow wedge-shaped capsule, 12–20 mm (0.47–0.79 in) long.

== Taxonomy and naming ==
Comersperma voluble was first formally described in 1806 by Jacques Labillardière, and the description was published in Novæ Hollandiæ plantarum specimen. The specific epithet (volubile) means "twining".

== Distribution and habitat ==
Love creeper occurs in heathland and forest in the states of Western Australia, South Australia, Tasmania, Victoria, New South Wales and Queensland, in Australia.
