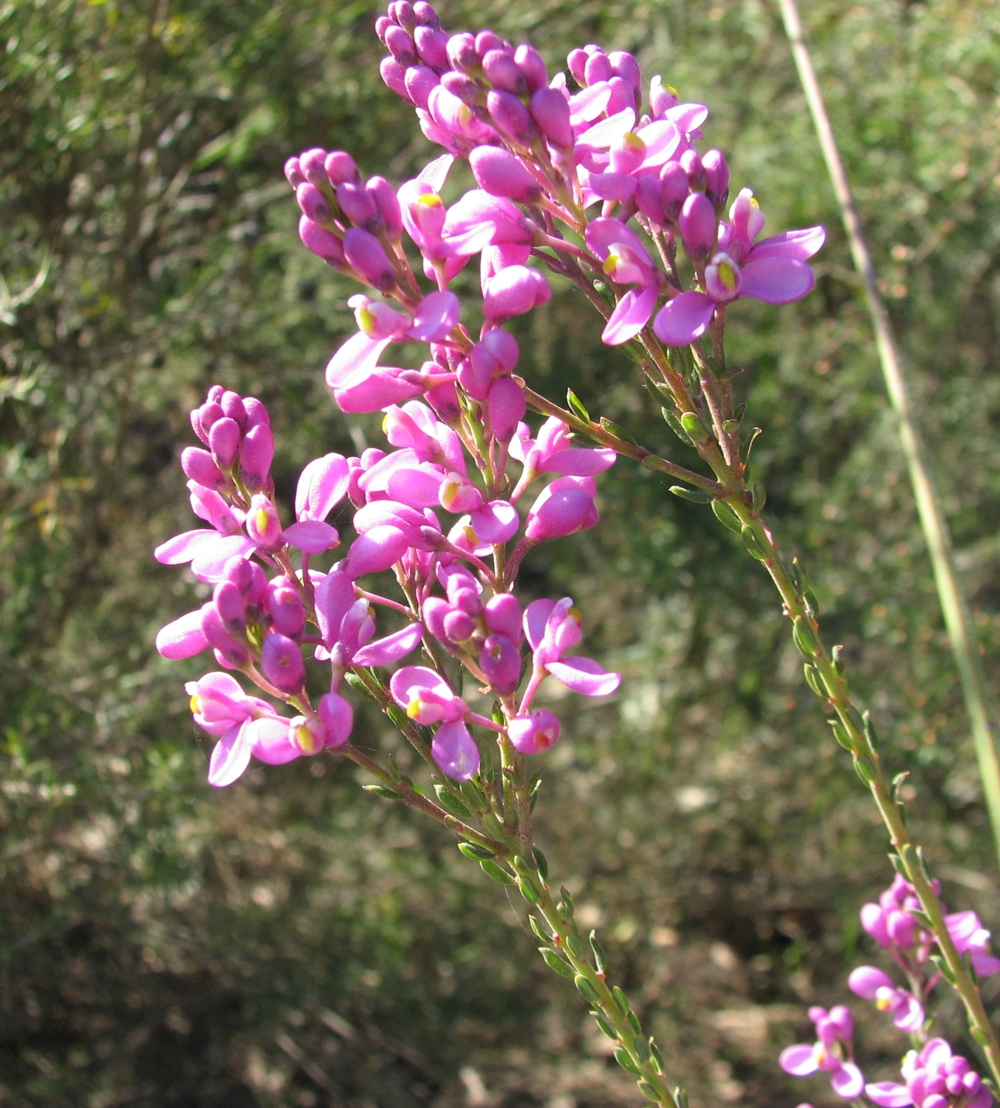
- Comesperma ericinum

Scientific classification
- Kingdom: Plantae
- Clade: Tracheophytes
- Clade: Angiosperms
- Clade: Eudicots
- Clade: Rosids
- Order: Fabales
- Family: Polygalaceae
- Tribe: Polygaleae
- Genus: Comesperma; Labill. (1806)

Species
- 38; see text

= Comesperma =

Genus of flowering plants

Comesperma is a genus of shrubs, herbs and lianas in the family Polygalaceae. The genus is endemic to Australia. It was defined by the French botanist Jacques Labillardière in his 1806 work Novae Hollandiae Plantarum Specimen. The genus name is derived from the Ancient Greek words come ("hair") and sperma ("seed"), and relates to the seeds bearing tufts of hair. The genus is distributed over southern Australia, particularly in the southwest of Western Australia, where 19 species are found. 24 species have been described.

The genus was classified in the tribe Polygaleae by Swiss botanist Robert Hippolyte Chodat in 1896. It was also considered a section of the genus Bredemeyera by van Steenis in 1968. This was not adopted widely, and a cladistic study based on morphology published in 1993 suggested they remain as separate genera. This analysis placed Comersperma basal to a group comprising the genera Polygala, Monnina subg. Monninopsis, Nylandtia, Muralita and Epirixanthes.

They are generally small shrubs, climbers or trailing plants, with small to vestigial leaves arranged alternately on the stem. The flowers resemble those of pea-flowers, and are borne in racemes. They are generally pink through shades of purple to blue in colour, although yellow-flowered species are known. Although the flowers are smaller than those of the related genus Polygala, the racemes can be showy, especially of floriferous species such as Comesperma ericinum.

Comesperma ericinum and C. volubile are sometimes seen in cultivation.

== Species ==
38 species are accepted.

- Comesperma acerosum Steetz
- Comesperma albimontanense A.J.Ford & Halford
- Comesperma anemosmaragdinum A.J.Ford & Halford
- Comesperma aphyllum R.Br. ex Benth.
- Comesperma breviflorum Pedley
- Comesperma calcicola Keighery
- Comesperma calymega Labill. - blue-spike milkwort
- Comesperma ciliatum Steetz
- Comesperma confertum Labill.
- Comesperma defoliatum F.Muell.
- Comesperma drummondii Steetz - Drummond's milkwort
- Comesperma ericinum DC. - pyramid flower, heath milkwort
- Comesperma esulifolium (Gand.) Prain
- Comesperma flavum DC.
- Comesperma griffinii Keighery
- Comesperma hispidulum Pedley
- Comesperma integerrimum Endl.
- Comesperma lanceolatum R.Br. ex Benth.
- Comesperma minutum A.J.Ford & Halford
- Comesperma nudiusculum DC.
- Comesperma oblongatum (Benth.) Pedley
- Comesperma pallidum Pedley
- Comesperma patentifolium F.Muell.
- Comesperma polygaloides F.Muell. - small milkwort
- Comesperma praecelsum F.Muell.
- Comesperma retusum Labill.
- Comesperma rhadinocarpum F.Muell. - slender-fruited comesperma
- Comesperma rhyoliticum A.J.Ford & Halford
- Comesperma sabulosum A.J.Ford & Halford
- Comesperma scoparium Drumm. - broom milkwort
- Comesperma secundum Banks ex DC.
- Comesperma sphaerocarpum Steetz
- Comesperma spinosum F.Muell. - spiny milkwort
- Comesperma sylvestre Lindl.
- Comesperma virgatum Labill. - milkwort
- Comesperma viscidulum F.Muell.
- Comesperma volubile Labill. - love creeper
- Comesperma xanthocarpum Steud.
