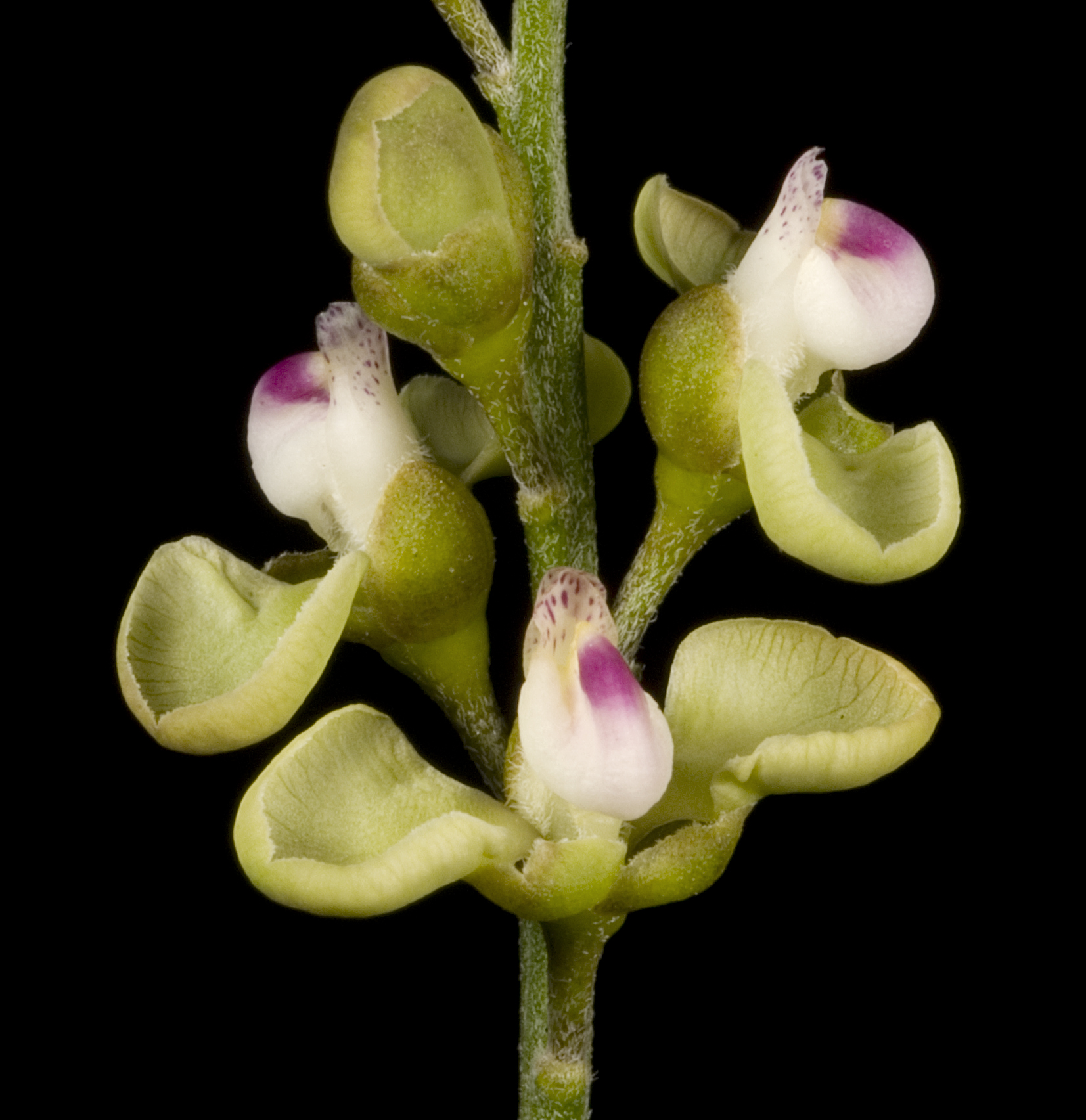

Scientific classification
- Kingdom: Plantae
- Clade: Tracheophytes
- Clade: Angiosperms
- Clade: Eudicots
- Clade: Rosids
- Order: Fabales
- Family: Polygalaceae
- Genus: Comesperma
- Species: C. integerrimum

Binomial name
- Comesperma integerrimum Endl.
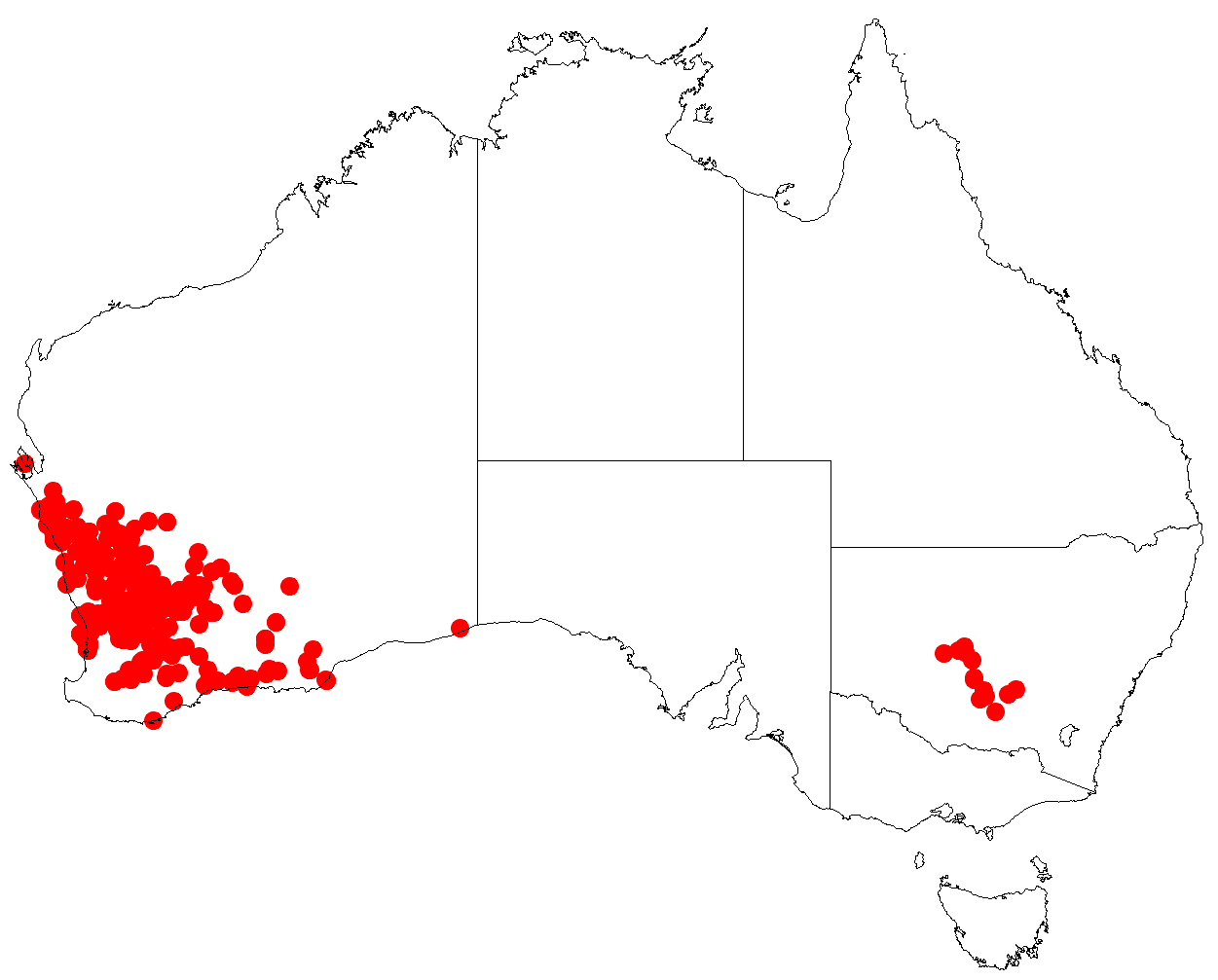
- Occurrence data from AVH

Synonyms
- Bredemeyera integerrima (Endl.) Steenis; Comesperma scandens Steud.

= Comesperma integerrimum =

Species of plant

Comesperma integerrimum is a twining shrub or climber in the family Polygalaceae.

The species was first formally described as Comesperma integerrima by the botanist Stephan Endlicher in Enumeratio plantarum quas in Novae Hollandiae ora austro-occidentali ad fluvium Cygnorum et in sinu Regis Georgii collegit Carolus Liber Baro de Hügel in 1837, from a specimen collected by Charles von Hügel at King George Sound (Western Australia).

The species occurs in the states of New South Wales and Western Australia.

== Description ==
Comesperma integerrimum is a climber growing from 30 cm to 8 m high, with sparsely branched, ridged stems with appressed hairs between the ridges. The stems are 1 to 2 m long. The leaves are thick and oblanceolate. The inflorescences are terminal on short side branches on stalks about 3.5 mm long. The flowers are greenish-yellow. The lateral petals are spoon-like, and the keel is pouched with two lateral lobes.
