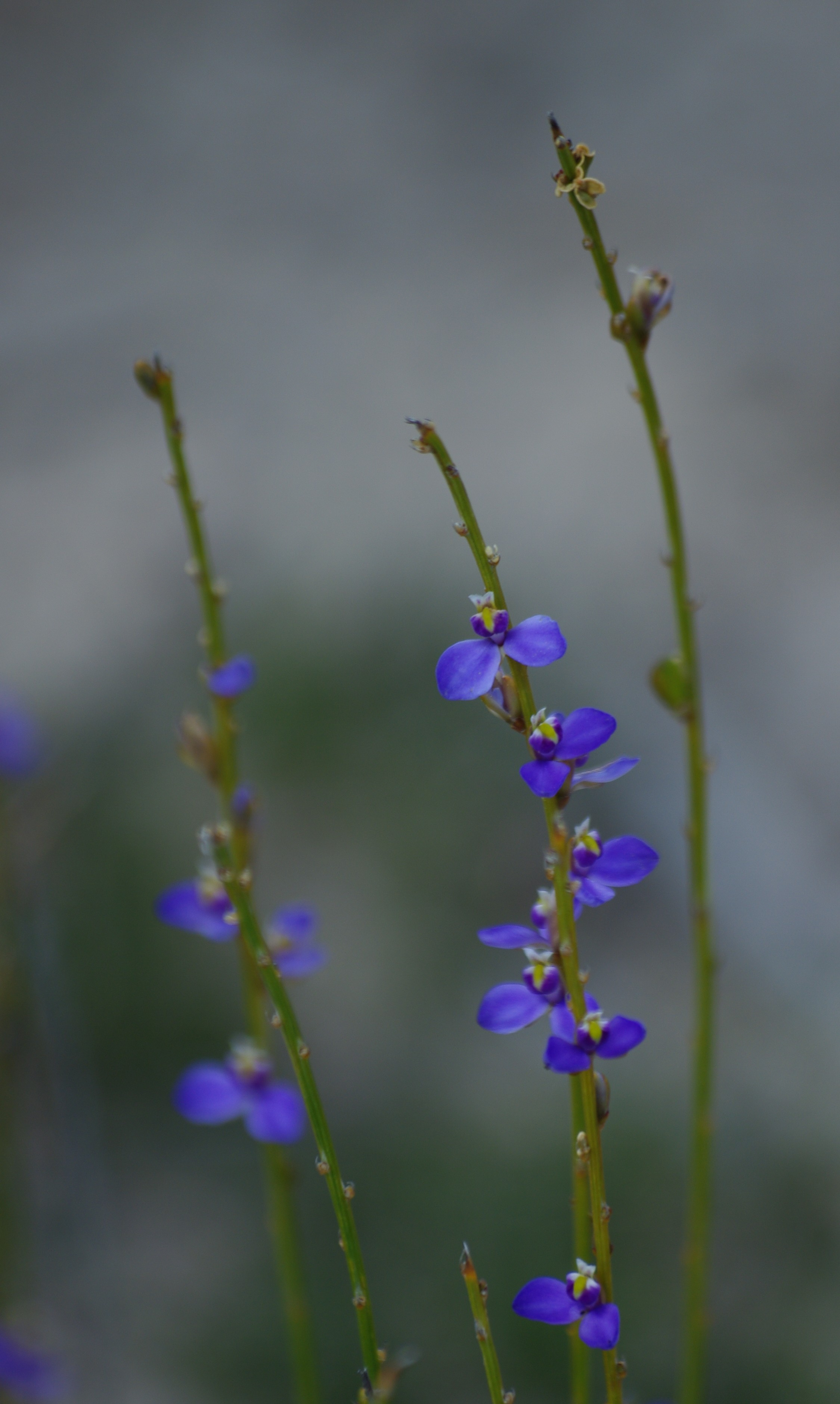
- Comesperma scoparium at Quairading, Western Australia

Scientific classification
- Kingdom: Plantae
- Clade: Tracheophytes
- Clade: Angiosperms
- Clade: Eudicots
- Clade: Rosids
- Order: Fabales
- Family: Polygalaceae
- Genus: Comesperma
- Species: C. scoparium

Binomial name
- Comesperma scoparium J.Drumm.
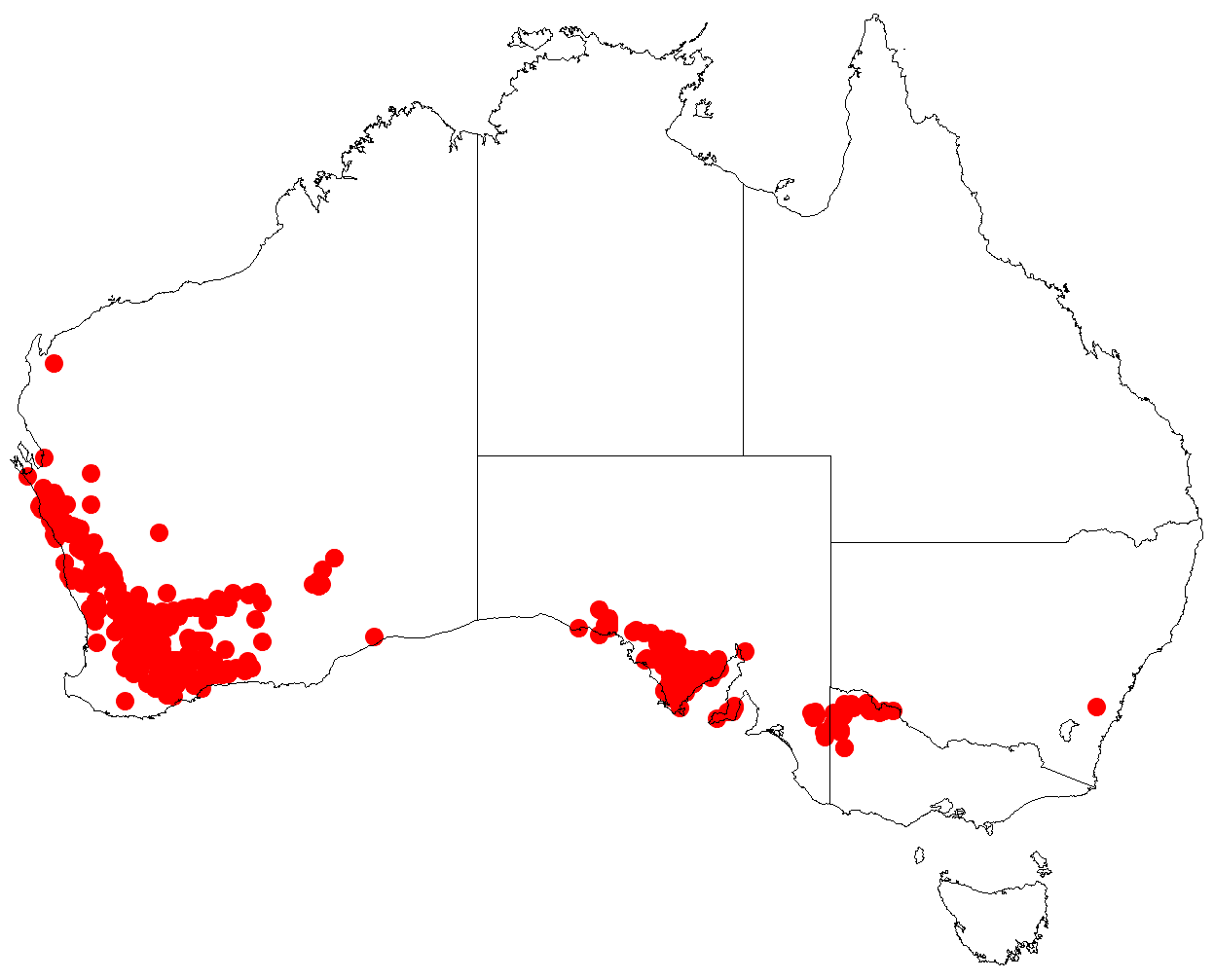
- Occurrence data from AVH

Synonyms
- Comesperma scoparium Steetz nom. illeg.; Bredemeyera scoparia (J.Drumm.) Chodat ex Ewart

= Comesperma scoparium =

Species of plant

Comesperma scoparium, commonly known as broom milkwort, is a small broom-like shrub of the family Polygalaceae. It usually grows to between 0.3 and 1.2 metres high and produces blue flowers between February and November in its native range.

The species was first formally described by James Drummond in The Journal of Botany in 1840 and given the name Comesperma scoparia, which was later amended to the current name.

The species occurs in the states of Western Australia, South Australia, and Victoria in Australia.

== Gallery ==
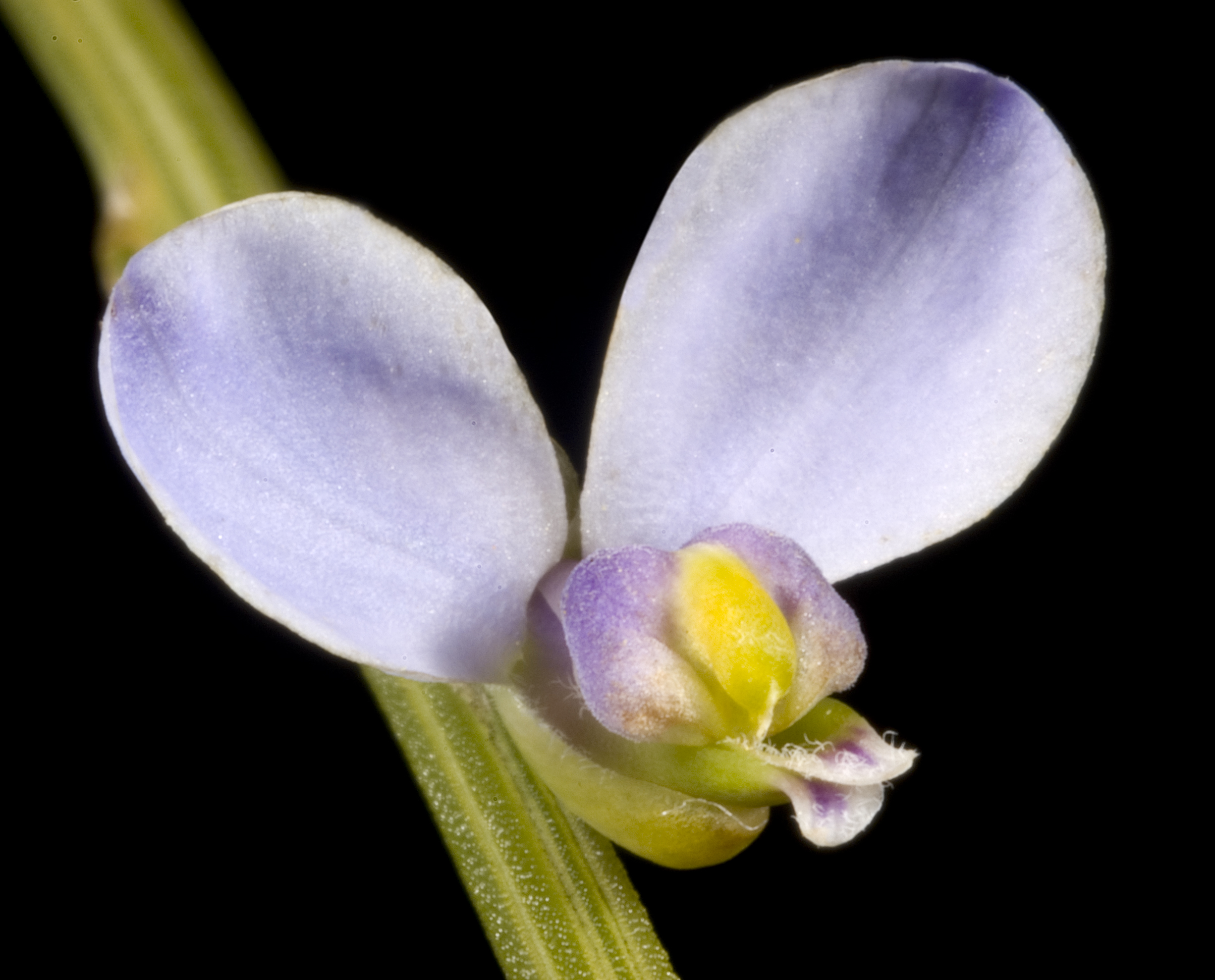

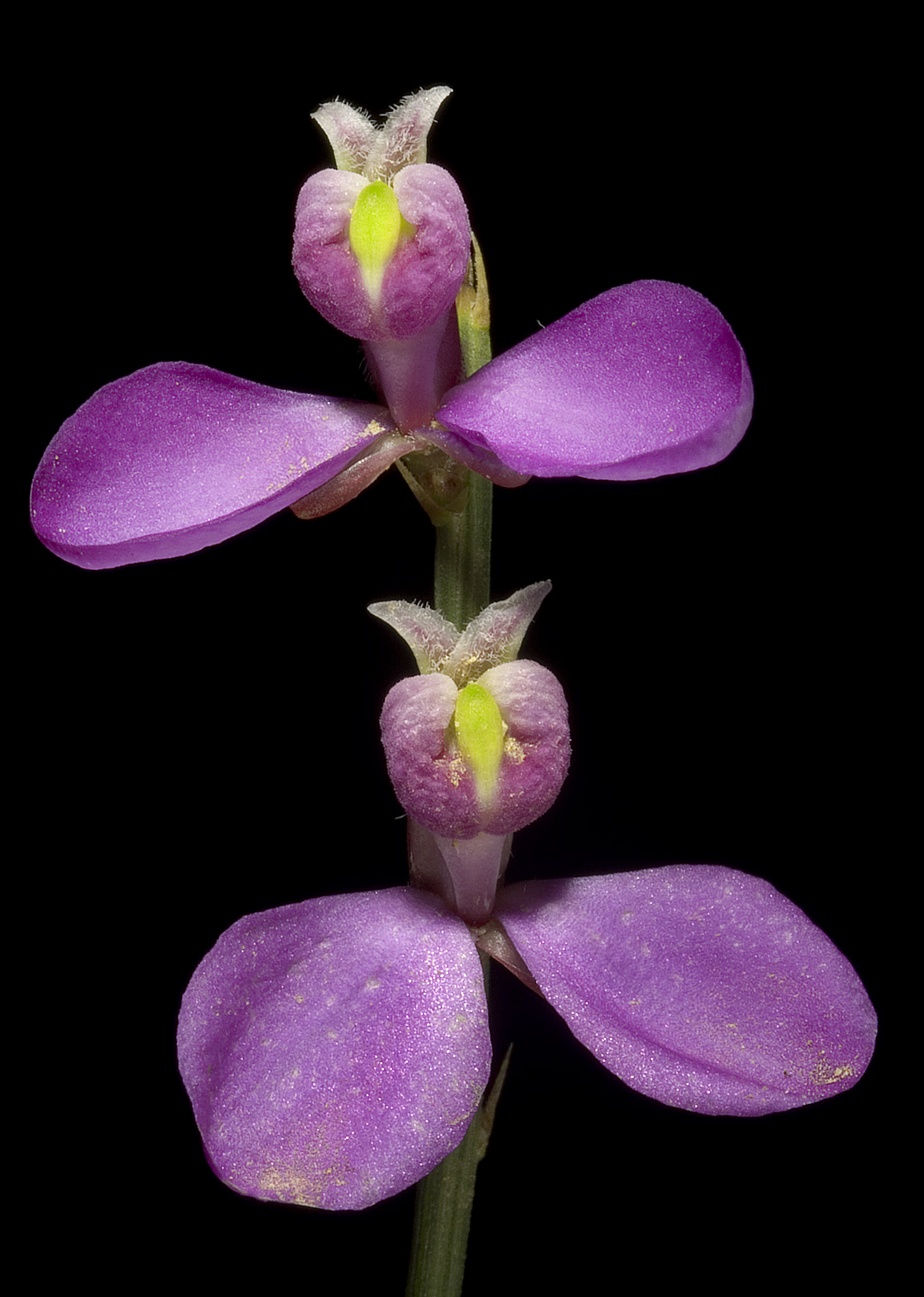
