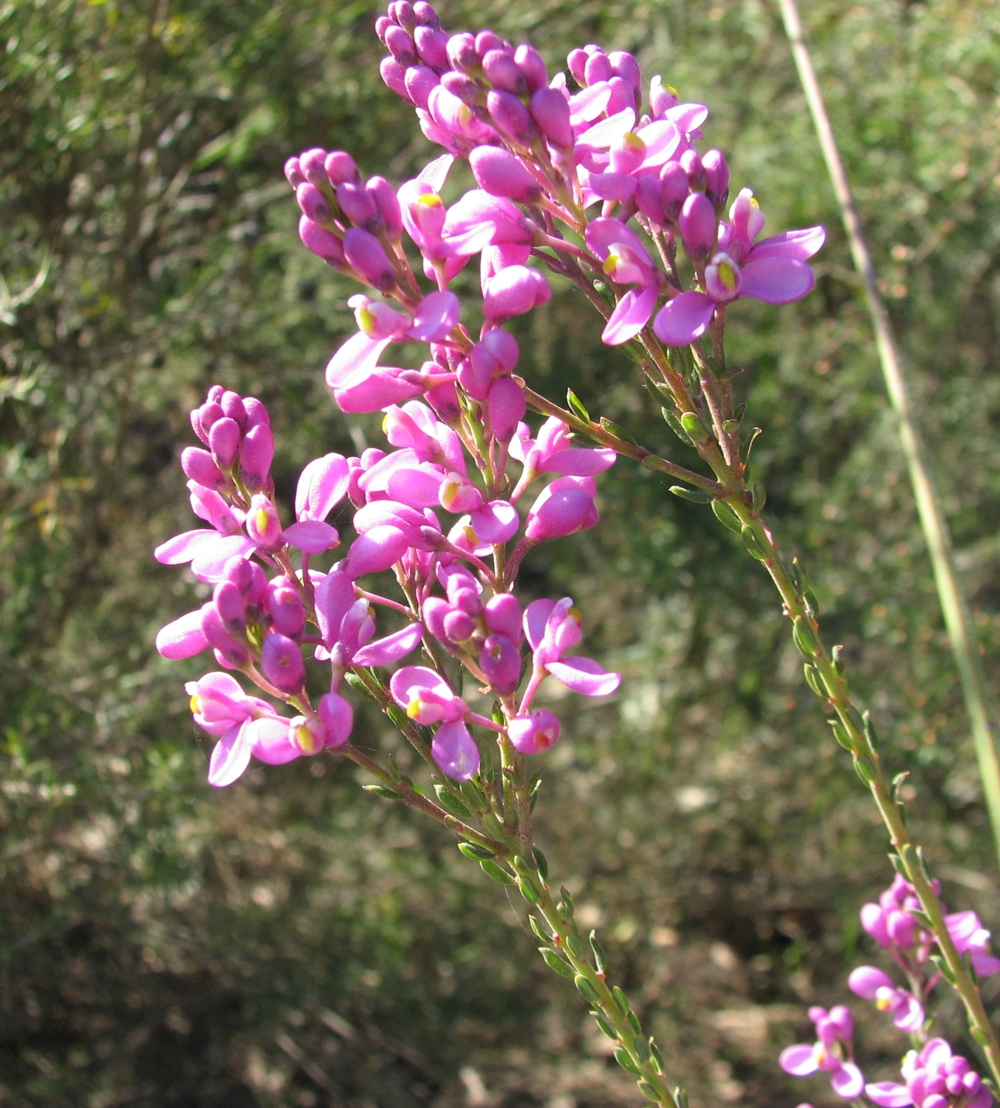
- Comesperma ericinum at Anglesea Heath, Victoria

Scientific classification
- Kingdom: Plantae
- Clade: Tracheophytes
- Clade: Angiosperms
- Clade: Eudicots
- Clade: Rosids
- Order: Fabales
- Family: Polygalaceae
- Genus: Comesperma
- Species: C. ericinum

Binomial name
- Comesperma ericinum DC.
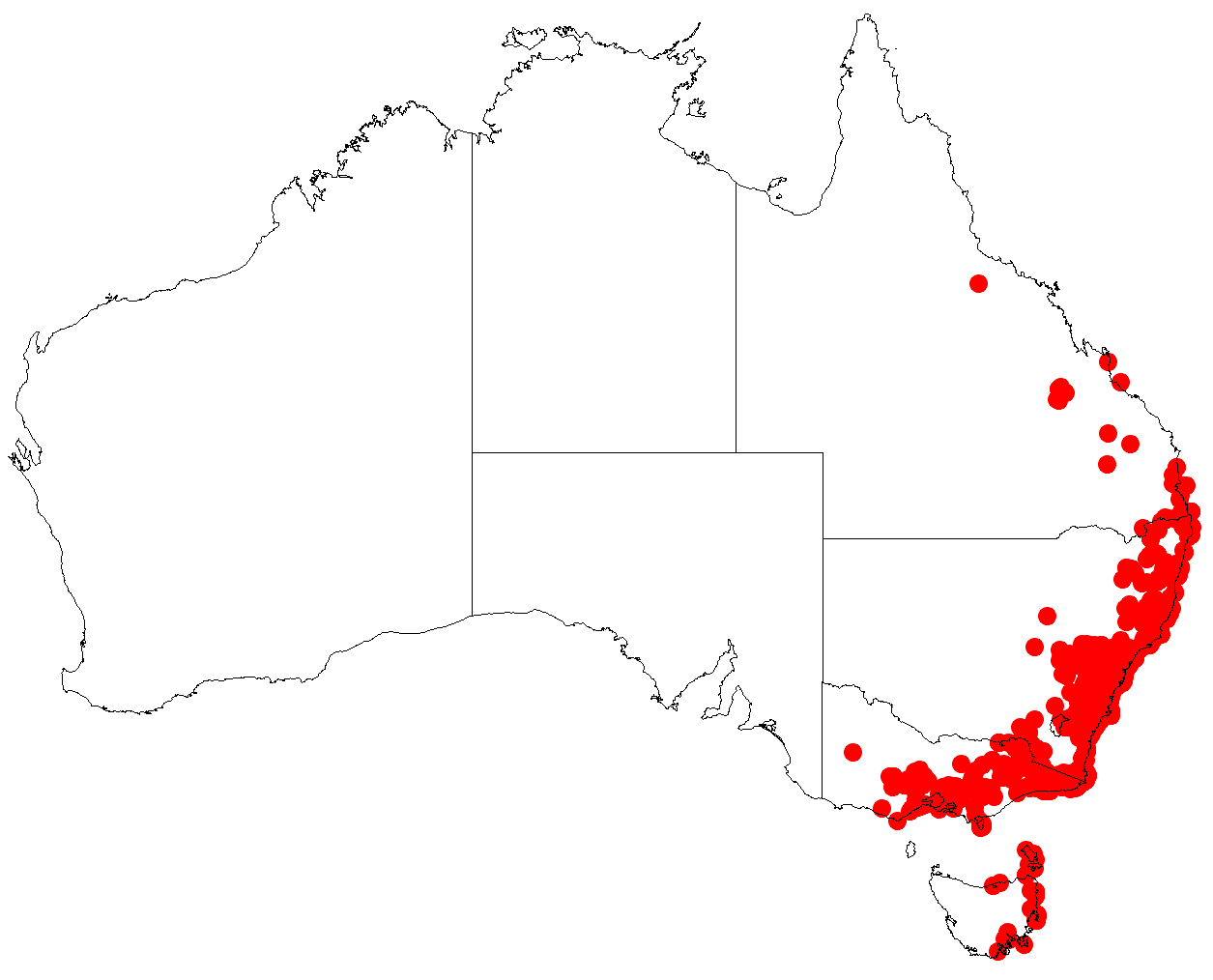
- Occurrence data from AVH

Synonyms
- Bredemeyera ericina (DC.) Chodat

= Comesperma ericinum =

Species of plant

Comesperma ericinum, commonly known as heath milkwort, pink matchheads or pyramid flower, is a slender shrub of the family Polygalaceae. It grows to between 1 and 1.5 metres high and branches out vertically. The leaves are 5 to 25 mm long and 1 to 4 mm wide. Purple, lilac-pink or white "winged" flowers are produced in clusters at the end of the stems from October to January.

The species was first formally described by Swiss botanist Augustin Pyramus de Candolle in Prodromus Systematis Naturalis Regni Vegetabilis in 1824, and given the name Comesperma ericina, which was later amended to the current name.

The species occurs in the states of South Australia, Tasmania, Victoria, New South Wales and Queensland in Australia.
