= Félix Lionnet =

French painter (1832–1896)

Félix Lionnet (15 December 1832 – 11 November 1896) was a French painter.

== Career ==
Lionnet was born at La Châtaigneraie, Vendée, the son of Félix Lionnet (1797–1842), a goldsmith, and his wife Marthe Clémentine Lebel (1810–1866). The Lebels were a staunchly republican family. Marthe Clémentine's grandfather, a member of the National Guard, was massacred by Vendéen rebels on 14 March 1796. Lionnet's paternal grandfather served in a republican hussar regiment and then in the navy as a medical officer. He appears to have taken part in the Battle of Trafalgar and later in the Battle of Grand Port in Mauritius where he died.

Félix Lionnet was educated at the Nantes Lycée. After leaving college he studied under a Nantais painter named Fortin and then in Paris under Camille Corot.

He left for Italy in April 1857 and also visited Greece before returning to France in 1861. Lionnet was part of circle which included the composer Georges Bizet and the painters Elie Delaunay, Edgar Degas, Gustave Moreau and Léon Bonnat.

After the fall of Napoleon III he served as mayor of La Châtaigneraie for five months. He was deputy mayor of the town between 1882 and 1892. His only son, born in 1869, Félix Léon Jean Baptiste Lionnet died in 1887 crushed between two railway carriages on the day the town's railway station was opened. He was 18 years of age.

Félix Lionnet died in La Châtaigneraie.

== Works ==
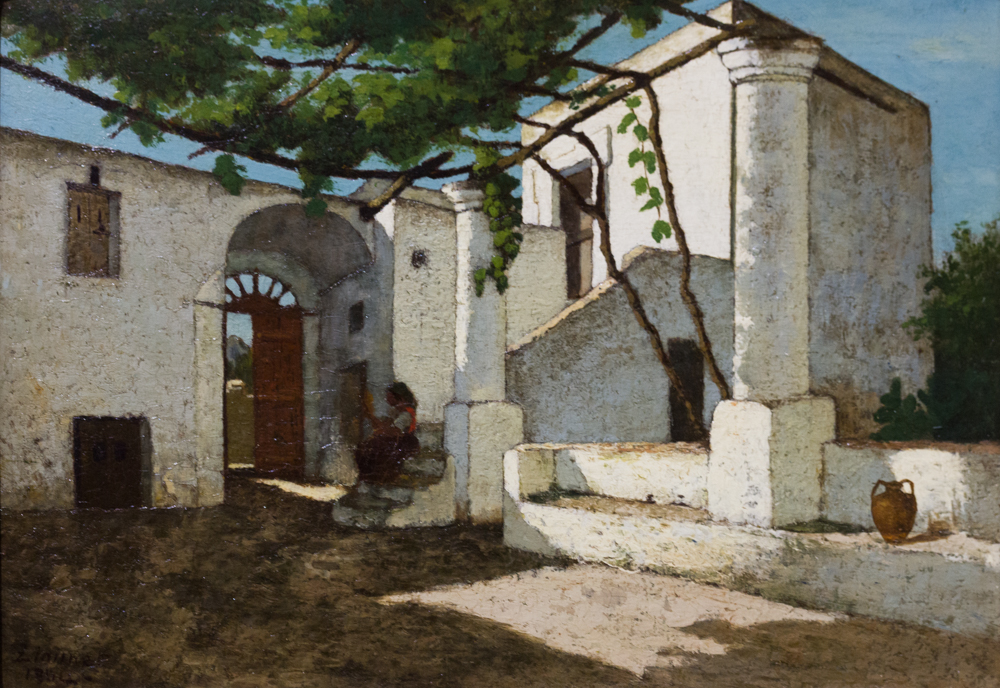
Paysage, Cour à Capri, 1864. Musée des Beaux-Arts de Nantes.

- Campagne romaine (undated), Musée des Beaux-Arts de Nantes
- Études pompéiennes (undated), Musée des Beaux-Arts de Nantes
- Via Tiburtine (undated), Musée des Beaux-Arts de Nantes
- Villa Terrassine (undated), Musée des Beaux-Arts de Nantes
- Vue de l'ile de Capri (1860), Musée municipal de La Roche-sur-Yon
- Le Forum (1863), Musée municipal de La Roche-sur-Yon
- Paysage (1863), musée des Beaux-Arts de Nantes
- Une rue à Sonnino (salon, 1864)
- Paysage (1864), Musée des Beaux-Arts de Nantes
- Souvenir de Capri (1864), Musée des Beaux-Arts de Nantes
