= Jacques Labillardière =

French botanist

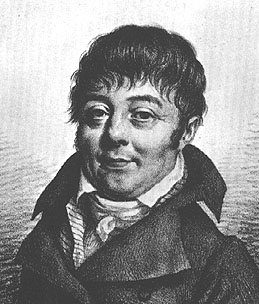
- 1821 portrait of Labillardière
- Born: Jacques-Julien Houtou de Labillardière; 28 October 1755; Alençon
- Died: January 8, 1834 (aged 78); Paris
- Education: Collège royal d'Alençon, University of Montpellier
- Alma mater: Reims University
- Occupation: Biologist

Jacques-Julien Houtou de Labillardière (28 October 1755 – 8 January 1834) was a French biologist noted for his descriptions of the flora of Australia. Labillardière was a member of a voyage in search of the La Pérouse expedition. He published a popular account of his journey and produced the first Flora on the region.

== Early life ==
Jacques Labillardière was born in Alençon, Normandy, France, on 28 October 1755. The ninth of 14 children of a lace merchant, he was born into a devoutly Roman Catholic family of modest means.

The surname Labillardière originated with Labillardière's grandfather, Jacques Houtou, who, in an affectation of nobility, appended the name of the family's estate, La Billardière, after his surname. Labillardière was thus baptised under the surname Houtou de Labillardière, but he later dropped the patronymic, retaining only Labillardière in both his publications and his signature.

As a child, he attended the Collège royal d'Alençon, where he excelled in his studies. Around 1772, he matriculated to the University of Montpellier, studying medicine under Antoine Gouan. He did not graduate from Montpellier, instead transferring to the Reims University around 1774. After graduating in 1779, he moved to Paris, where he spent much of his time at the Jardin du Roi. Having decided to pursue his interest in natural history, rather than a medical career, he took up an opportunity to collect specimens for Louis-Guillaume Le Monnier.

== Voyages ==
=== Early voyages ===
Labillardière undertook his first voyage as a naturalist in 1783. Sent to Britain by Le Monnier to study the exotic plants in cultivation there, he ended up staying almost two years, during which time he established enduring friendships with Sir Joseph Banks, James Edward Smith, Aylmer Bourke Lambert and George Williams. On returning from Britain, Labillardière immediately set out on a voyage through the French Alps.

=== Near East ===
Labillardière's early voyages seem to have fired a passion for exploring foreign lands because, on his return to Paris, he immediately began making plans for a voyage to the Near East, in order to study the plants described by physicians of the Islamic Golden Age. He again secured Le Monnier's sponsorship, and Le Monnier in turn secured the support of France's foreign minister Charles Gravier, comte de Vergennes, making Labillardière's voyage virtually an official mission. Labillardière left Paris in November 1786, and departed France via Marseille in February 1787. He travelled first to Cyprus, then on to Latakia, Syria. From there he moved south along the coast as far as Acre, before turning inland to Nazareth, via the Mount Carmel Range. From Nazareth, he headed north to Damascus, visiting Mount Hermon en route. He then crossed the Mount Lebanon Range, arriving in Tripoli in late June. After a detour to Bsharri to see the Cedars of Lebanon, he returned north along the coast, departing from Latakia in November.

The following year, Labillardière made another voyage to the eastern Mediterranean. Little is known of that voyage, except that he made landfall at Crete, Corsica, Sardinia and Lampedusa.

The result of the two voyages was a collection of around 1000 specimens. As sponsor of the expedition, they were the property of Le Monnier, but Labillardière retained a great many duplicate specimens. The voyage also resulted in Labillardière's botanical account of the region, later published as Icones plantarum Syriae rariorum. Only 55 taxa were published in it but, according to Duyker, "this was sufficient to secure for him a place among the founders of modern botany in the Near and Middle East".

=== Australia ===
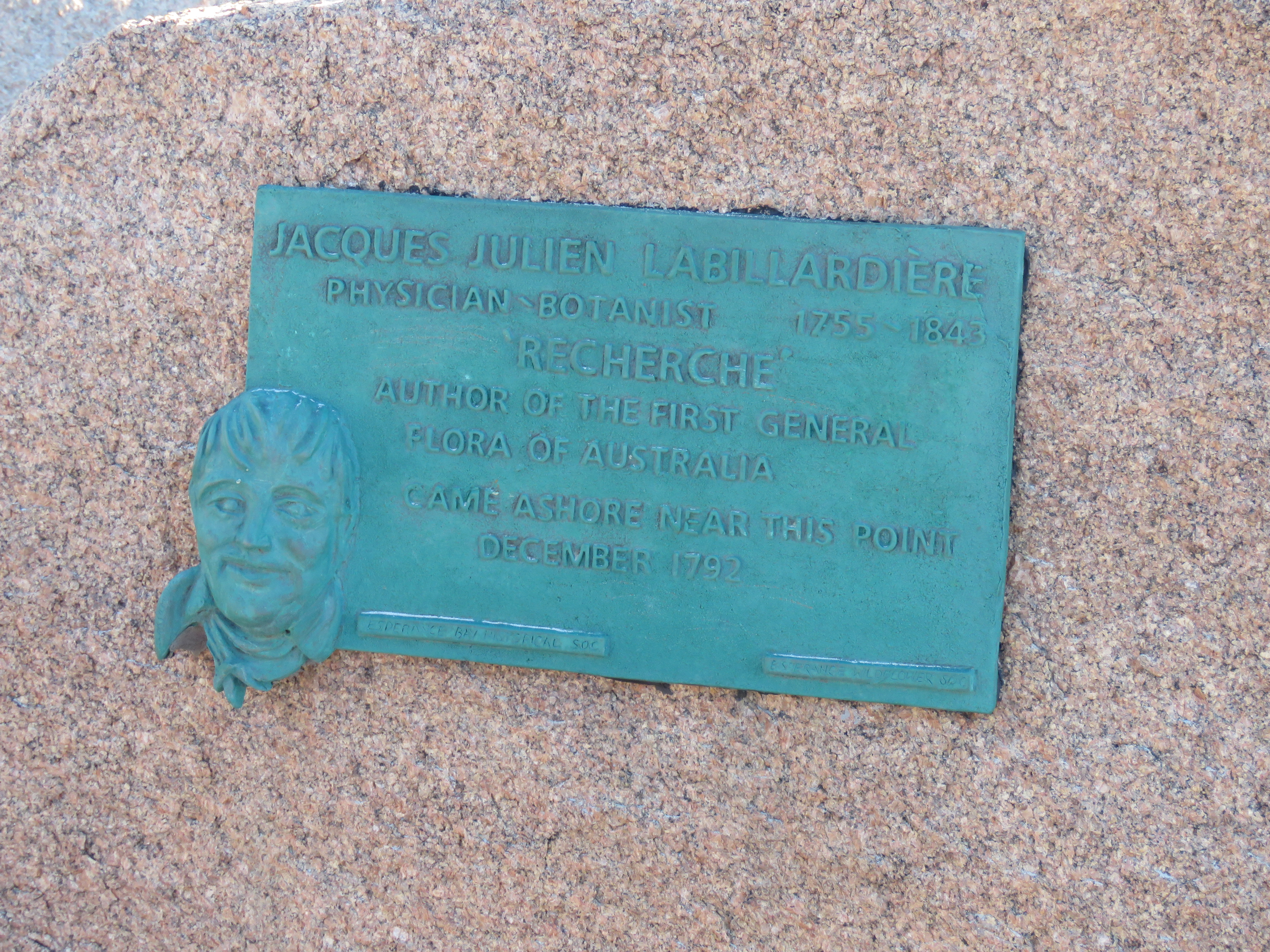
A plaque commemorating Labillardière's December 1792 landing in Esperance, Western Australia

In 1791, Labillardière was appointed as a naturalist to Bruni d'Entrecasteaux's expedition to Oceania, in search of the lost ships of Jean-François de Galaup, comte de La Pérouse. D'Entrecasteaux failed to find any trace of the missing expedition, but his ships visited south-west Australia, Tasmania, the North Island of New Zealand, and the East Indies, where Labillardière, Claude Riche and Étienne Pierre Ventenat, assisted by gardener Félix Delahaye, collected zoological, botanical and geological specimens, and described the customs and languages of the local Indigenous Australians.

While the expedition was exploring Oceania, the French Revolutionary Wars had broken out in Europe and, when the ships reached Java, Labillardière's scientific collections were seized by the British as spoils of war. Labillardière despaired at the loss of three years' painstaking work, but he had an ally in Joseph Banks, who campaigned for the return of the collections. In 1796, Banks's lobbying succeeded, and he was able to write to William Price at the British Museum:

... his Majesty's Ministers have thought it necessary for the honour of the British nation and for the advancement of Science that the right of the Captors to the Collection should be on this occasion wav'd and that the whole should be returned to M. de Billardiere, in order that he may be able to publish his Observations on Natural History in a complete manner ... By this her Majesty will lose an acquisition to her herbarium, which I very much wish'd to see deposited there, but the national character of Great Britain will certainly gain much credit for holding a conduct towards Science and Scientific men liberal in the highest degree.

Labillardière returned to France with his collections in 1796. In 1799, he published a popular account of his voyage, Relation du Voyage à la Recherche de la Pérouse, and was elected to the Académie des sciences. Between 1804 and 1807, he published Novae Hollandiae Plantarum Specimen, the first general description of the flora of Australia. In 1816, he was elected a foreign member of the Royal Swedish Academy of Sciences.

== Character ==
Labillardière had an abrasive, critical personality. Even his eulogist described him as "sharp and austere", and a man who tended to "hide everything that was good in his soul behind a caustic and bitter intellect". He was also extremely stubborn. Denis and Maisie Carr describe him as having "the stubborn, almost pigheaded, independent mentality of the peasants near Alençon". On the other hand, he was highly regarded for his sincerity and generosity. Augustin Saint-Hilaire, for example, wrote that Labillardière "could perceive someone's slightest defect; yet he would have been ready to open his purse for the same man whose ridiculousness had not escaped him, and would have done all in his power to help him".

It has been said that Labillardière was scrupulously honest, especially with money, yet he has also been criticised for failing to acknowledge the work of others, such as his unattributed use of specimens collected by L'Héritier.

Nothing is known of his physique, but his travels as a naturalist reveal him to be a man of good physical fitness, with a strong constitution and immense stamina. Intellectually, he is shown to be not just an outstanding botanist and naturalist with excellent observational skills, but also to be possessed of considerable linguistic abilities, including an impeccable grasp of Latin.

Politically he was a staunch republican.

== Legacy ==
Labillardière is commemorated in over a hundred published plant names, the most prestigious of which is the Australian endemic genus Billardiera, named by James Edward Smith in 1793, in Labillardière's honour. In 1978, the Irish botanist Ernest Charles Nelson published Adenanthos labillardierei with the specific epithet: "in recognition of Labillardière's contribution to the knowledge of this genus, and Australian botany". A small number of animal species have been named in his honour as well, namely the Tasmanian Pademelon (Thylogale billardierii ) and the red-legged skink (Ctenotus labillardieri). His name is further honoured in Labillardiere Peninsula and Point Labillardiere on Bruny Island, and by Cape Labillardiere on Fergusson Island, Papua New Guinea.

His herbarium is now part of the Museo di Botanica at the Museo di Storia Naturale di Firenze, University of Florence. About fifty of the plant genera established by Labillardière survive as current genera today.

Amongst the notable plants detailed in the author's two works on Australia are the first descriptions of Cephalotus follicularis and Eucalyptus cornuta.

== Standard author abbreviation ==
The standard author abbreviation Labill. is used to indicate this person as the author when citing a botanical name.

== Historiography ==
Only two portraits of Labillardière survive: an 1821 lithograph of a sketch by Julien-Léopold Boilly, and a lithograph by Langlumè, based on a portrait by Alexis Nicolas Noël.

The first biography of Labillardière was written by Jean Pierre Flourens, whose graveside eulogy of Labillardière was published in the Annales du Museum d'histoire in 1837. That first biography was very highly regarded, and seems to have formed the basis of most of the entries in French biographical dictionaries published over the next century, as well as the anonymous biography in Volume 2 of the Australian Dictionary of Biography.

New insights into Labillardière's life and work did not begin to appear until the 1953 publication, by Auguste Chevalier, of new information on Labillardière's early life, together with a number of his letters. More letters were published in Gavin de Beer's 1960 The sciences were never at war. Further biographical material was published by Frans Stafleu in 1967, and by Denis and Maisie Carr in 1976 and 1981. The first book-length treatment of Labillardière's life appeared in 2003, with the publication of Edward Duyker's award-winning Citizen Labillardière: A naturalist's life in revolution and exploration (1755–1834).

A major thread in the historiography of Labillardière is questions surrounding the reliability of his work. There are anomalies and contradictions in both Labillardière's account of his voyage and in his botanical data. The former appear to be at least partly attributable to mistakes made in converting the measurements and dates in his journal into the metric system and the Republican Calendar respectively. In the latter case, the anomalies mostly concern the collection locations of his specimens, about which he was apparently quite careless. Ernest Charles Nelson in particular did much to shed doubt upon Labillardière's reliability, and over time a tradition arose amongst botanists that Labillardière's data was not to be trusted.

His reputation has since been restored somewhat by the Carrs who, in 1976, published a detailed validation of his account of his visit to Observatory Island, where Eucalyptus cornuta (Yate) was first collected. Labillardière's type location for Eucalyptus cordata remained unverified for nearly 200 years until, in August 1987, Bradley Potts, from the Department of Botany at the University of Tasmania, and Gintaras Kantvilas, from the Tasmanian Herbarium, rediscovered a stand of 200 trees on steep and densely forested Penguin Island. Edward Duyker suggested that, given the period the specimens were in foreign hands, "the errors made in the published habitat statements for about a dozen species may have been a result of a shuffling of herbarium sheets or notes without Labillardière’s knowledge".

One of the greatest challenges for biographers of Labillardière has been the gaining of insight into his character and personality. That is largely due to the paucity of documents and testimonies: fewer than sixty of his letters survive, and many of them are purely related to business matters. Since he clearly had an austere personality, Duyker speculates that "the lack of surviving personal detail may in itself be a reflection of a strongly defensive character".

== Selected publications ==
- Labillardière, Jacques Julien Houtou de (1804). Novae Hollandiae Plantarum Specimen (in Latin). Paris: Dominæ Huzard., see Novae Hollandiae Plantarum Specimen

== See also ==
- European and American voyages of scientific exploration

== Bibliography ==
- Beolens, Bo; Watkins, Michael; Grayson, Michael (2011). The Eponym Dictionary of Reptiles. Baltimore: Johns Hopkins University Press. xiii + 296 pp. ISBN 978-1-4214-0135-5. (Labillardier, p. 149).
- Duyker, Edward (2003). Citizen Labillardière: A Naturalist’s Life in Revolution and Exploration (1755–1834). Melbourne: Miegunyah/Melbourne University Press. ISBN 0-522-85010-3. Paperback reprint (2004). ISBN 0-522-85160-6.
- Carr, S. G. M.; Carr, D. J. (1981). "A charmed life: The collections of Labillardière". In Carr, D. J.; Carr, S. G. M. (eds.). People and Plants in Australia. Sydney: Academic Press. pp. 79–115. ISBN 0-12-160720-8.
- Duyker, Edward (2011). Labillardière and his Relation. Public Domain Review.
