= Élisabeth-Paul-Édouard de Rossel =

Officer of the French Navy, explorer and hydrographer (1765–1829)

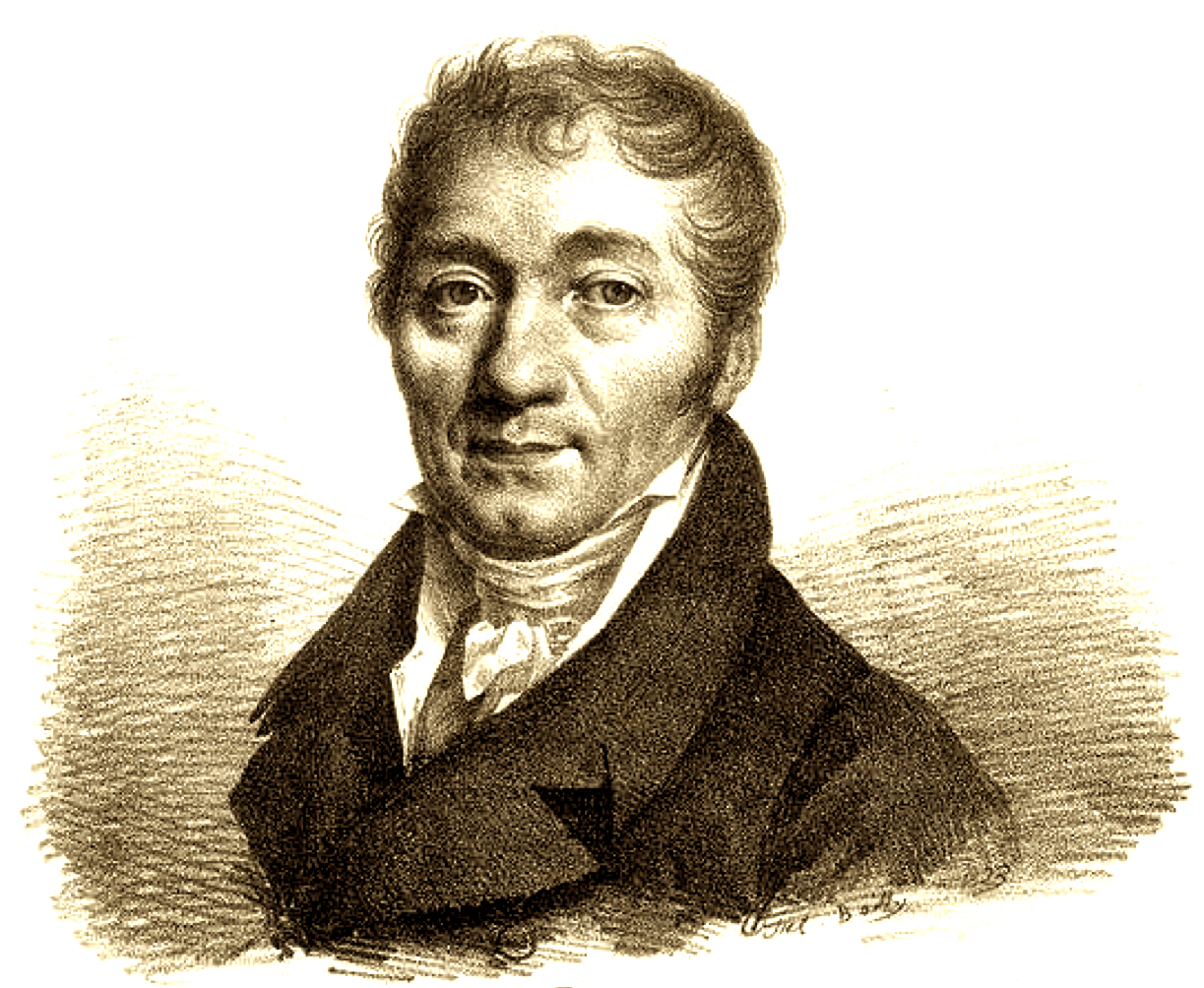
- Born: 11 September 1765; Sens
- Died: 12 November 1829 (aged 64) Paris
- Branch: French Navy
- Rank: Contre-Amiral
- Known for: Voyage de Dentrecasteaux envoyé à la recherche de La Pérouse
- Conflicts: American Revolutionary War
- Office: Director of the Hydrographic Service
- Term: 1827-1829

Élisabeth-Paul-Édouard de Rossel (1765–1829), also known as Chevalier de Rossel, was a French naval officer, explorer, and hydrographer. He took part in the voyage of Antoine Bruni d'Entrecasteaux to the Pacific (1791–1793), and became the leader of the expedition after the deaths of the senior officers. The expedition disintegrated in the revolutionary wars, but Rossel was able to bring the records and collections of the expedition back to Europe and write the record of the voyage, which was published in 1808.

He was noted for his magnetic observations, which showed that the earth's magnetic field is not constant, but increases from the equator towards the poles. His subsequent career was with the French Hydrographic Office, of which he became director. He was important in planning the chain of lighthouses that were constructed around the French coast from 1825 to 1854.

== Life ==
Rossel was born on the 11 September 1765 in Sens the son of Christophe-Colomban de Rossel, a Maréchal de Camp in the French army, and his wife Elisabeth-Jacqueline L'Hermite de Chambertrand. His mother was guillotined during the Terror, and his father was killed fighting for the Royalists in the Battle of Quiberon in 1795, at the age of 70.

Rossel was educated at the College of La Flèche, and joined the Navy in July 1780 as a Garde de Marine. He served in the ships Ville de Paris, Magnanime, and Vénus, taking part in naval battles against the British in the American War of Independence as part of the squadron of de Grasse in the Antilles. He was promoted to Enseigne in 1784. At some point he was trained in astronomical observations at the Paris Observatory, and in 1785 he joined the Résolution under d'Entrecasteaux who was Commander of the French naval forces in the East Indies. He was promoted to Lieutenant de Vaisseau in February 1789.

=== Voyage in search of La Pérouse ===
In 1785, La Pérouse had set out on a major voyage of exploration. He travelled to Chile, Hawaii, Alaska, California, Macau, the Philippines, Korea, the Pacific coast of Russia, Japan, Samoa, Tonga, and Australia. He left Botany Bay on 10 March 1788, and no further word was heard from him. Concerns grew, and in 1791 it was agreed to send an expedition in search for him. D'Entrecasteaux was appointed commander, and two ships were fitted out, Espérance and Recherche. The expedition had scientific goals as well as the remit to search for the La Pérouse expedition, and included hydrographers, naturalists, a mineralogist, a botanist, and two astronomers. Rossel was appointed second Lieutenant on Recherche. The expedition left Brest on 29 September 1791, and travelled to the Cape of Good Hope via Tenerife. At the Cape, d'Entrecasteaux received a report suggesting that inhabitants of the Admiralty Islands had been seen wearing French uniforms and sword belts, he decided to sail there via Van Diemen's Land (Tasmania) rather than exploring the south coast of New Holland (Australia) as had been originally intended. While at the Cape, several of the expedition scientists left due to poor health. This led to d'Entrecasteaux giving Rossel the care of the chronometers and the conduct of the astronomical observations.

The expedition reached Tasmania on 23 April, anchoring in a bay they named Recherche Bay, and remained for five weeks, provisioning, making repairs, collecting specimens, and surveying. Rossel carried out as many astronomical observations as possible, given that the weather was nearly always rainy. One eclipse of a satellite of Jupiter was observed, as well as some lunar distances. They then travelled along the west coast of New Caledonia before reaching their next anchorage in the south of New Ireland. After provisioning they left on 24 July 1792, and reached the Admiralty Islands four days later. At Nauna (Vendola Island) they were unable to land because of the reefs, but sent an armed boat with trading goods towards the island, commanded by Rossel. They were met by islanders, some swimming out to meet them, some walking on the reefs. Exchanges were friendly, but the sailors saw no signs of European clothing or other adornments, and d'Entrecasteaux concluded that there was no evidence of interaction with La Pérouse's expedition.

The ships then set sail for Tanjung Goede Hoop in Western New Guinea and on to Amboina (Ambon) in the Moluccas where they arrived on 5 September, and were able to reprovision and send despatches home. After a stay of five weeks they headed towards SW Australia, following the west coast of Timor, and reaching the Savu Islands on 25 October, where Rossel fixed the latitude and longitude. In SW Australia they discovered Esperance Bay which gave them welcome shelter from stormy weather, but had no source of fresh water, so they headed directly to Tasmania, reaching Recherche Bay for the second time on 21 January 1793. They remained in Tasmania until 27 February, exploring, collecting, and making friendly contact with the inhabitants. They next sailed to Tongatapu, passing the North Cape of New Zealand, then to Balade, New Caledonia. Here, Huon de Kermadec, commander of Espérance died, on 6 May 1793. D'Auribeau then took over command of Espérance, and Rossel became capitaine de pavillon on the Recherche.

The expedition then sailed to the Santa Cruz Islands, through the southern part of the Solomon Islands, past the northern part of the Louisiade Archipelago, then through the Dampier Strait to the northern part of New Britain, which they reached on 8 July. D'Entrecasteaux died on 19 July 1793, and d'Auribeau succeeded him as leader, but he was also ill, and Rossel took effective command until he recovered. The ships then headed towards Java, making slow progress, and making stops to replenish supplies. On 19 October they anchored off the Dutch port of Surabaya. Here they found out that France and the Netherlands had been at war for eight months, and that in France a republic had been declared and King Louis XVI executed. Eventually, after protracted negotiations both with the Dutch and among the officers of the expedition, agreement was reached that the ship were to be surrendered, and all the papers and collections to be shipped to the Netherlands. Before this could happen, d'Auribeau died, and command of the remnant of the expedition passed to Rossel.

It was early in 1795 before a convoy left Java, with Rossel, some other members of the expedition, and many cases containing the records and collections of the voyage, as well as the original survey plans drawn by Beautemps-Beaupré, the expedition's hydrographic surveyor. They made slow progres, and did not reach the Cape of Good Hope until 4 April 1795. They stayed there for six weeks, until a British naval squadron raided the bay. In the meantime France had consquered the Netherlands and installed a puppet government. Britain and the Netherlands were now enemies. The convoy departed in a hurry with the cases, but Rossel was left behind, and followed in another ship. However, the ship carrying the papers and collections was captured by a British ship, HMS Sceptre off Saint Helena, and Rossel's ship was captured near Shetland. Rossel and the expeditions records were reunited on the Sceptre in the Shannon Estuary and then sailed to Deal, where by chance Rossel met the Prime Minister William Pitt, and was able to give him a petition requesting the "conservation of the fruits of the expedition". Rossel was sent by boat to London, where he arrived on 1 November 1795, and the cases were lodged in the Admiralty.

=== London and Paris ===
Once in London, Rossel, as a scientist and also a Royalist, was not treated as a prisoner of war. He was given a provisional passport, and given access to the expedition records in the Admiralty. He worked on organizing the materials from the voyage, recording his memories in writing, and calculating the results of the astronomical observations. He dined at the Royal Society Club as the guest of Alexander Dalrymple, the Hydrographer of the Navy and was made a temporary assistant at the Hydrographic Office. He lived in London until 1802, when the Treaty of Amiens brought peace between Britain and France, at least temporarily. He was invited to return by the French Government, and he judged it safe to do so.

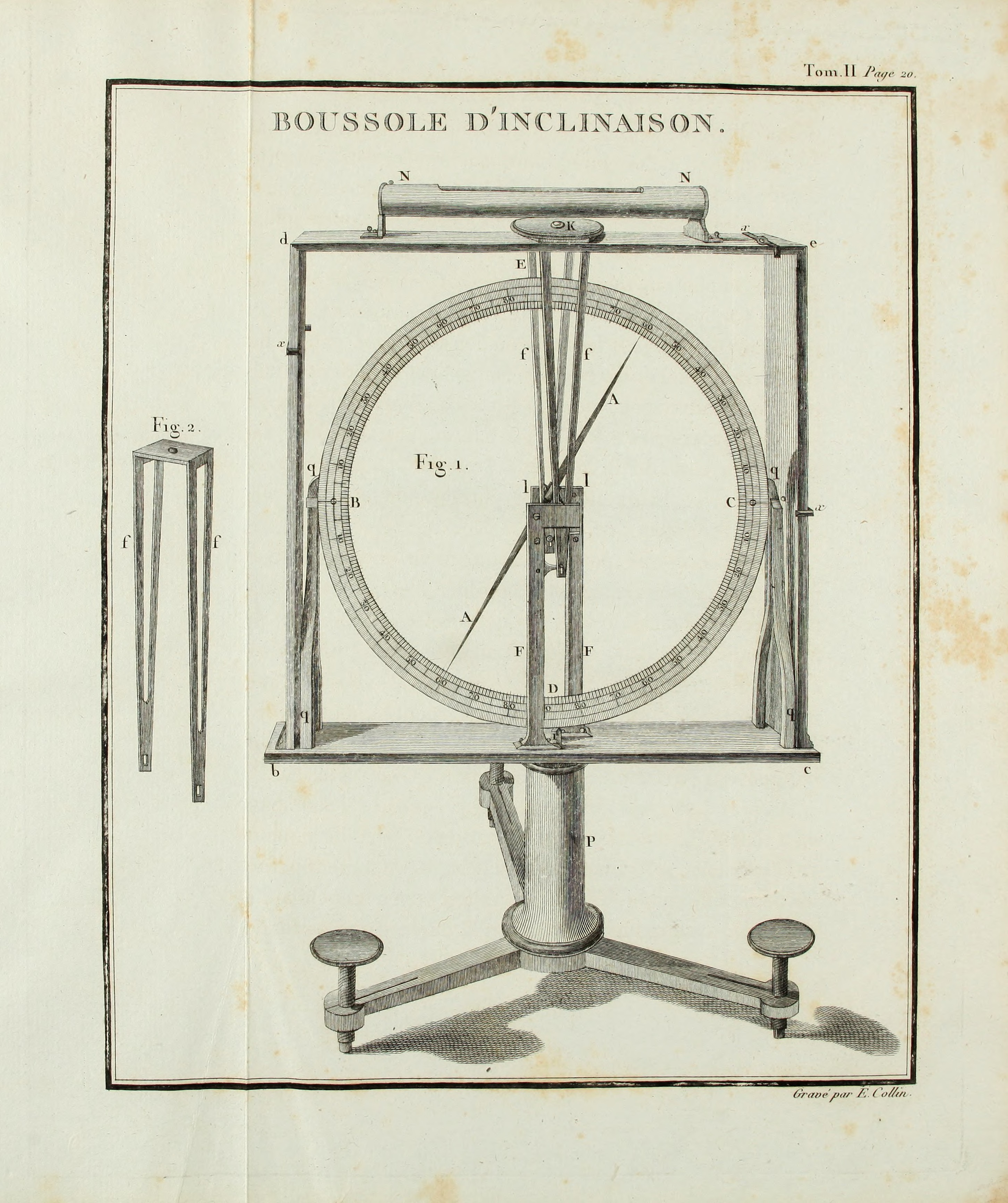
The dip circle used in Rossel's magnetic observations

In January 1803 Rossel was appointed to the Dépôt des cartes et plans de la Marine, the French Hydrographic Service, where he continued to work on preparing the expedition materials for publication, which took until 1808. The Voyage de Dentrecasteaux envoyé à la recherche de La Pérouse was in two volumes, the first being d'Entrecasteaux's journal supplemented with Rossel's own record of the voyage, and the second recording the astronomical observations, the latitude and longitude positions calculated of the places surveyed, and the methods used to compensate for error in the observations. Volume 2 also contained a description of the magnetic experiments carried out, which showed for the first time that the intensity of the earth's magnetic field is not constant, but is greater nearer to the poles than at the equator.

In 1810, Rossel was requested by Jean-Baptiste Biot to write a treatise on nautical astronomy, which was appended to the second edition of Biot's Elementary Treatise on Physical Astronomy. In 1811 Rossel was appointed a member of the Bureau of Longitudes, and in the following year became a member of the Academy of Sciences. In 1814 Rossel became assistant director of the Hydrographic Service, and in 1827 was appointed director. In 1820 he was made Chevalier de le Légion d'honneur and in 1822 honorary Contre-Amiral. Rossel was one of the founding members of the Société de Géographie.

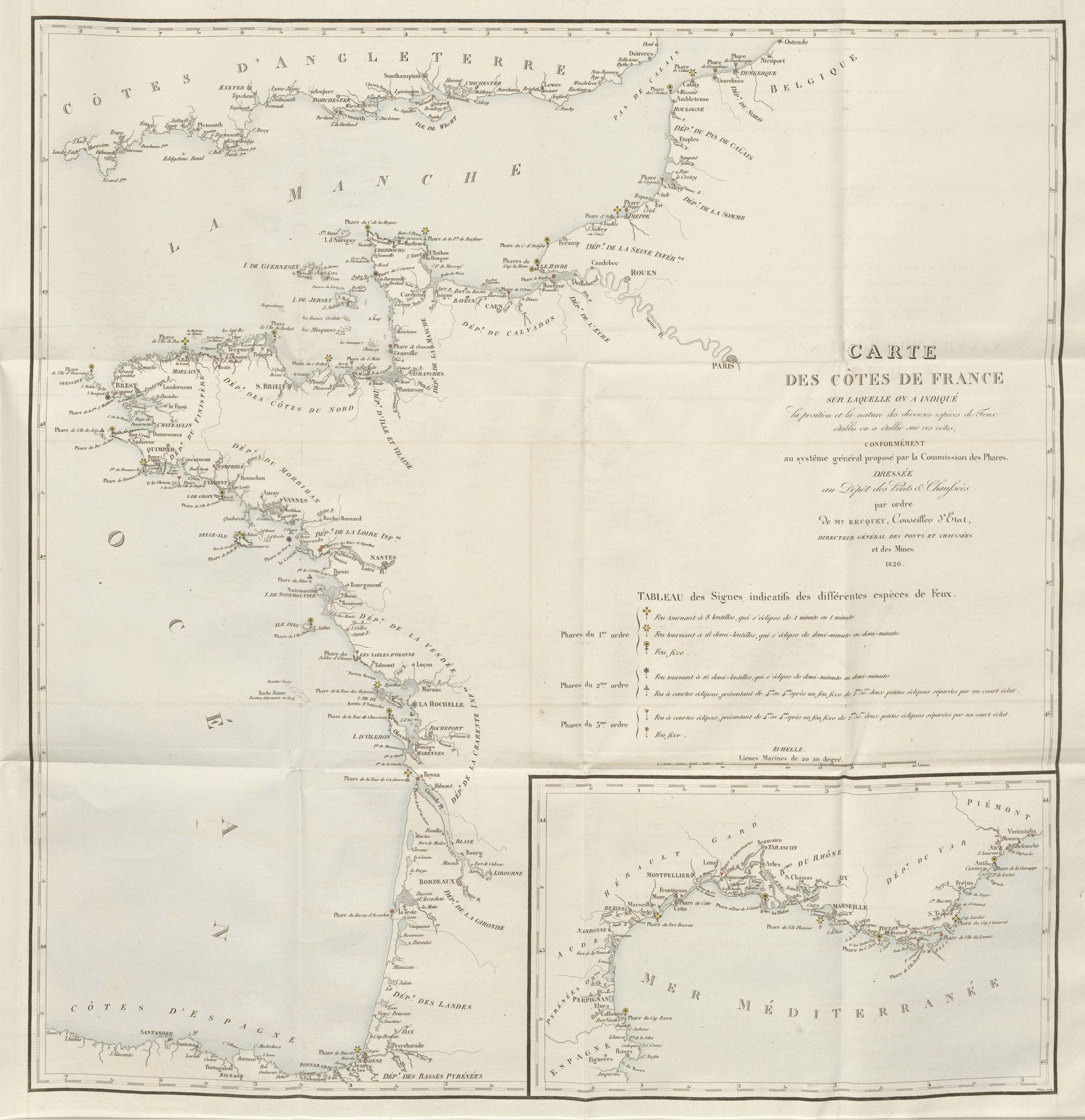
Map of France showing the lighthouses proposed in the 1825 Commission report

In 1820 Augustin-Jean Fresnel built his first refractor using an assemblage of small lenses and prisms rather than a single large lens (too heavy for practical use) or a reflector (less efficient). An improved version was demonstrated to the Commission des Phares from the top of the Arc de Triomphe, and was visible for 32 km. In 1823 the system was then installed in the Cordouan Lighthouse at the mouth of the Gironde estuary, greatly increasing the visible range of the light. This success led to a project to creation of a network of lights so that navigators approaching the French coast could always be in sight of a lighthouse. In 1825, Rossel prepared a report for the commission with specific proposals for the location and power of the lights, and this was adopted. The project was completed in 1854 with the lighting of the Baleines lighthouse on the Île de Ré.

Rossel wrote a number of articles in the Biographie universelle, ancienne et moderne, including those on Christopher Columbus, James Cook, d'Entrecasteaux and La Pérouse. His last published work was the first report of the voyage of l'Astrolabe commanded by Jules Dumont d'Urville, who had returned from a three-year circumnavigation in March 1829. The report was read to the Academy of Sciences in August of that year. Rossel died on 20 November. At his funeral oration, Dumont d'Urville said "had many friends and not one enemy". Rossel Island in the Louisiade Archipelago is named after him.

== See also ==
- List of burials at Père Lachaise Cemetery

== Publications ==
- Bruni d'Entrecasteaux, Joseph Antoine; de Rossel, Élisabeth-Paul-Édouard (1808). Voyage de Dentrecasteaux envoyé à la recherche de La Pérouse (in French). Imprimerie Impériale. Volume 1; Volume 2
- Biot, Jean-Baptiste; de Rossel, Elisabeth Paul Edouard (1811). Traité élémentaire d'astronomie physique: Volume 3 (in French). With section on nautical astronomy by Rossel
- de Rossel, Élisabeth Paul Édouard (1814). Description nautique de la côte d'Afrique, depuis le Cap Blanc jusqu'au Cap Formose (in French). de l'Imprimerie Royale.
- —— (1815) Instruction pour aller chercher la barre de Bayonne, et entrer dans la rivière (in French). Paris: de l'Imprimerie Royale
- —— (1817) Mémoire sur l'état et les progrès de la navigation, lu à la séance générale des quatre Académies.
- —— (1819) Livre de signaux de jour à l'usage des vaisseaux de guerre français
- —— (1821) Livre de signaux de nuit et de brume à l'usage des vaisseaux de guerre français, avec l'usage dudit livre
- —— (1825). Rapport contenant l'exposition du système adopté par la Commission des phares, pour éclairer les côtes de France. de l'Imprimerie Royale.
- —— (1829). Rapport sur la navigation de l'Astrolabe, commandée par M. Dumont D'Urville: lu à l'Académie Royale des Sciences, dans la séance du 17 août 1829 (in French). Paris: Imprimerie de J. Tastu , éditeur.
