= Félix Delahaye =

French gardener and explorer (1767–1829)

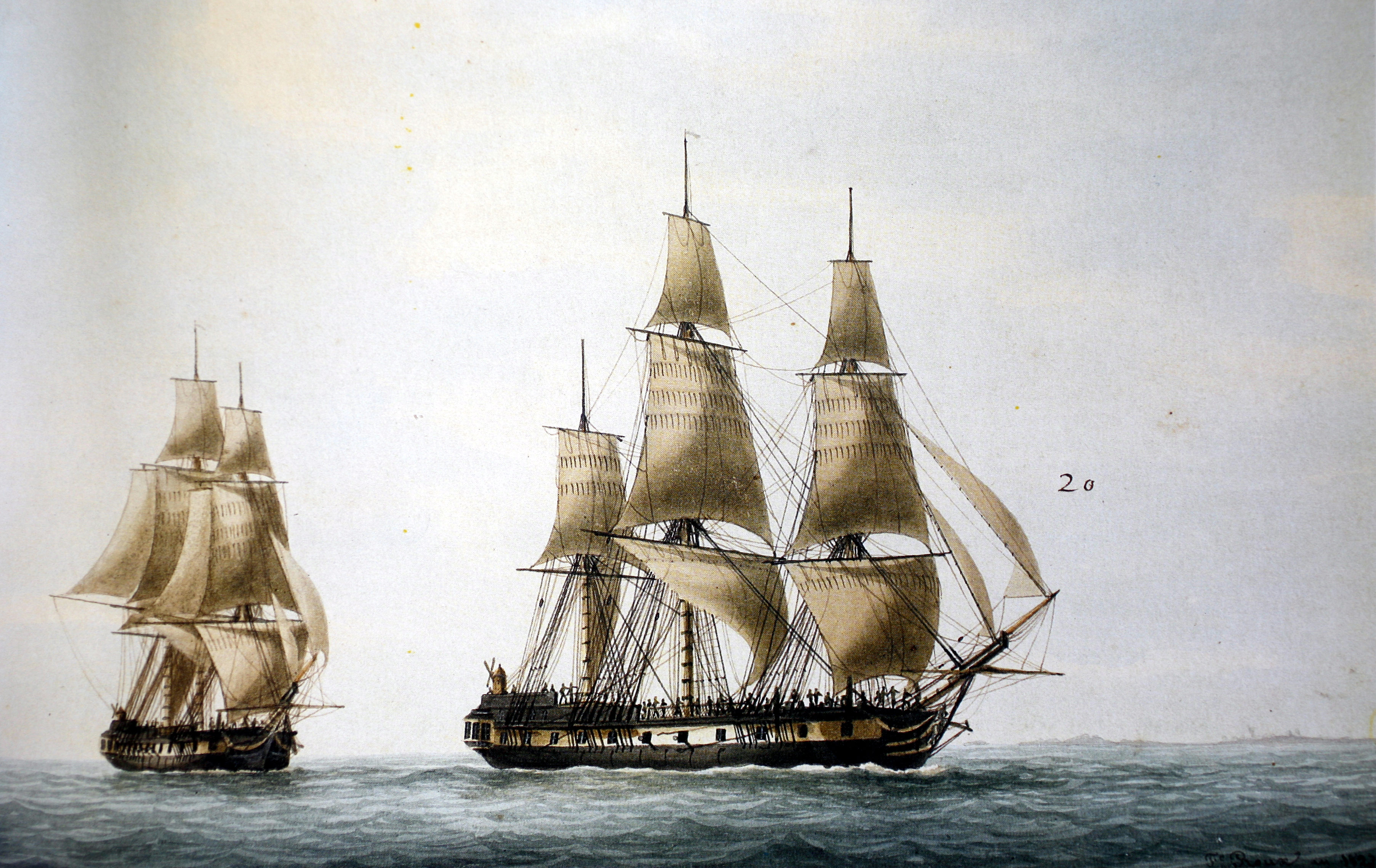
The French frigates Recherche and Espérance sent in search of Jean François de la Pérouse, painted by François Joseph Frédéric Roux (1805–1870)

Félix Delahaye (Note: Félix's surname is variously presented as de Lahaie, Delahaie, de Lahaye, de La Haye, and Lahaie.) (1767–1829) was a French gardener who served on the Bruni d'Entrecasteaux voyage (1791–93) that was sent by the French National Assembly to search for the missing explorer Jean-François La Perouse. He was also one of the earliest European gardeners to work in Australia.

Delahaye was one of many gardener-botanists employed on European colonial voyages of scientific exploration in the late 18th and early 19th centuries. Their duty was to assist with the collection, transport, cultivation and distribution of economic plants. They worked with the naturalists on these expeditions, but gave particular assistance to the botanists by collecting live plants and seed, as well as plant specimens for herbarium collections. They often maintained journals and records of their collections and made observations on the vegetation encountered during the voyage. On this particular expedition, Delahaye assisted the naturalist and botanist Jacques-Julien Houtou de Labillardière—who accumulated one of the largest herbarium collections of that era and published what was, in effect, the first Flora of Australia based on the collections he made on the New Holland (Australian) leg of the expedition. Delahaye also made numerous botanical collections of his own.

On returning to France Delahaye eventually became Head Gardener to Empress Josephine at the Château de Malmaison.

== Early life ==
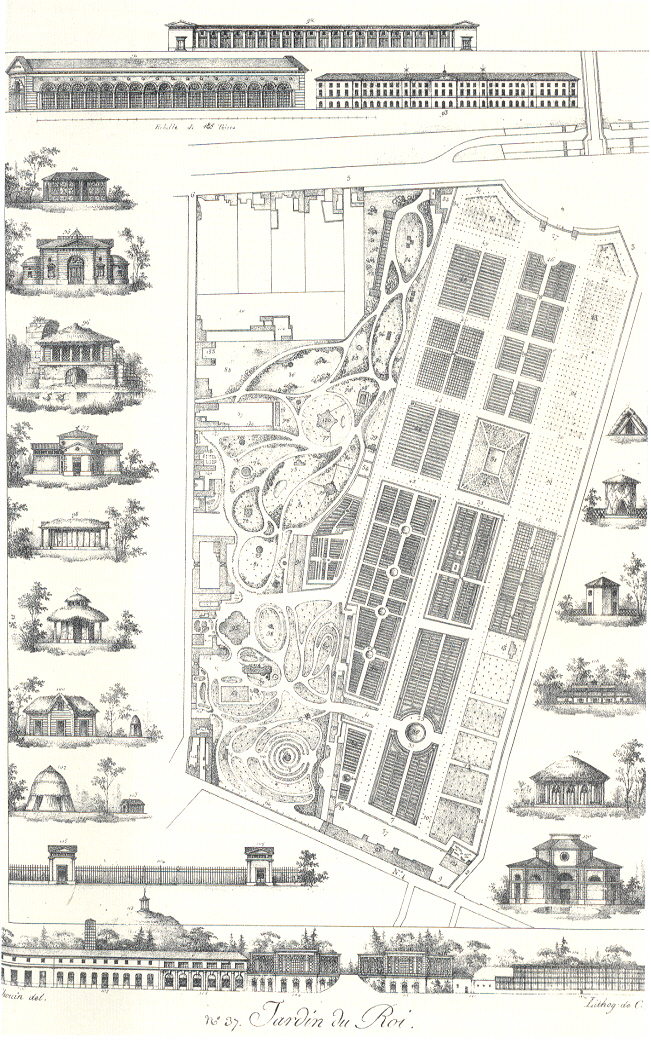
Plan of the Jardin des Plantes, Paris, in 1820. Delahaye joined the staff in 1788 aged 20 as a young gardener and was eventually promoted to the position of Director of Horticulture

Félix Delahaye was the son of Normandy labourer Abraham Delahaye and his wife Marie-Anne-Élisabeth Sapeigne who lived in the village of Caumont (Seine-Maritime) about 20 kilometres from Le Havre. At the age of 17 he left his parents' farm and was employed as an apprentice gardener at the botanical garden of the Académie des Sciences in Rouen, historic capital of Normandy, under the direction of a Monsieur Varin. Just before the French Revolution in 1788, at the age of 20, he commenced work with André Thouin at the Jardin du Roi in Paris as a junior gardener, rising through the ranks to become Director of Horticulture at the city's new school of horticulture (Ecole Nationale d'Horticulture). His mentor, Thouin, was professor of horticulture in the Botany School of the Jardin du Roi. After the French Revolution this garden assumed its present name, the Jardin des Plantes. Thouin was also treasurer to the prestigious Société d'Histoire Naturelle and is commemorated by the name Thoin Bay in Tasmania.

== Bruni d'Entrecasteaux expedition ==
The La Pérouse's expedition was last seen on 10 March 1788 as it left Botany Bay in New Holland, Australia. It had been observed by ships of the First Fleet of convicts from England under the command of Arthur Phillip who was just leaving for Port Jackson after deciding that Botany Bay was unsuitable for settlement. In 1791 France's National Assembly decided to send out a search mission led by Bruni d'Entrecasteaux. With Thouin's recommendation Delahaye, who was at this time principal assistant gardener at the botany school of the Jardin du Roi, was invited to join the expedition's team of "savants" (more than ten scientists, engineers and artists) as the expedition's gardener. Thouin described Delahaye as " ... strong, vigorous and well-suited for voyages. Gentle, honest and of an exact probity. Active, hard-working and passionately loving his calling. Knowing by theory and by practice the processes of gardening and knowing very well the plants cultivated in the Jardin du Roi." Delahaye's annual salary on the expedition, paid by the navy, was 1000 livres (24 livres were equivalent to the gold coin, the Louis d'or), and he was reimbursed 1,236 livres for equipment. As a lowly gardener he was not permitted accommodation with the savants or to dine with the officers. Throughout the expedition he worked with diligence and honesty, keeping meticulous horticultural notes in his journal. Thouin wanted Delahaye to improve his schooling on the expedition and recommended that Delahaye study Latin, try to translate the works of Linnaeus and to read and write in French. His reading included Pierre Bulliard's Dictionairre Elementaire de Botanique (1783) and the works of Henri-Louis Duhamel du Monceau (1700–1782) who published works on forestry, naval architecture (especially relating to timber), agriculture, fruit tree cultivation, seed conservation and insect pests affecting seeds. Delahaye arrived in Brest, ready for the ship's departure, with four cases of garden seeds, one of fruit tree nuts, one containing gardening tools and another gardener's clothing.

=== Landfalls ===
The expedition consisted of two frigates, Recherche and Espérance. The first landfall was the Canary Islands, then the Cape of Good Hope followed by Van Diemen's Land (in Recherche Bay, Tasmania, named by d'Entrecasteaux after the flagship of his expedition ), then New Caledonia, Admiralty Islands, the Dutch colony of Ambon (where Delahaye exchanged seeds with the Dutch governor) then to south-western Australia discovering and naming Esperance Bay (d'Entrecasteaux now commemorating his second ship). With water running low the ships then returned to the safety of Recherche Bay, thus completing a counterclockwise circumnavigation of the continent. The next destination was Tonga where Delahaye collected breadfruit for transport to the Isle de France (now Mauritius), then to New Caledonia (where Kermadec, captain of the Espérance died), past Vanikoro Island (unaware that this is where La Pérouse had been shipwrecked) then through the Solomons, Trobriand Islands and finally, just before the death of d'Entrecasteaux in July 1793 from scurvy, surveyed the coasts of eastern New Guinea and northern New Britain. The expedition was now under the new command of d'Auribeau the ships arriving at Sourabaya, Java, in 1793, to be told that France was now at war with European countries including Holland, Britain and Spain, also that Louis XVI had been guillotined and a French republic was now declared. The Dutch seized the ships. With one exception all the savants appeared to have revolutionary sympathies. They were interned at Semerang and the scientific collections confiscated to be eventually captured later by the British from a French ship returning them to France. Under the benign auspices of Joseph Banks, these were returned to France. Delahaye was not, like Labillardiere, interned at Semerang but was permitted to tend the breadfruit trees destined for the Isle de France. In the course of the expedition, and under the guidance of Labillardière, Delahaye had made a numbered collection of 2,699 dried plant specimens as well as many collections of seed.

=== A European vegetable garden ===
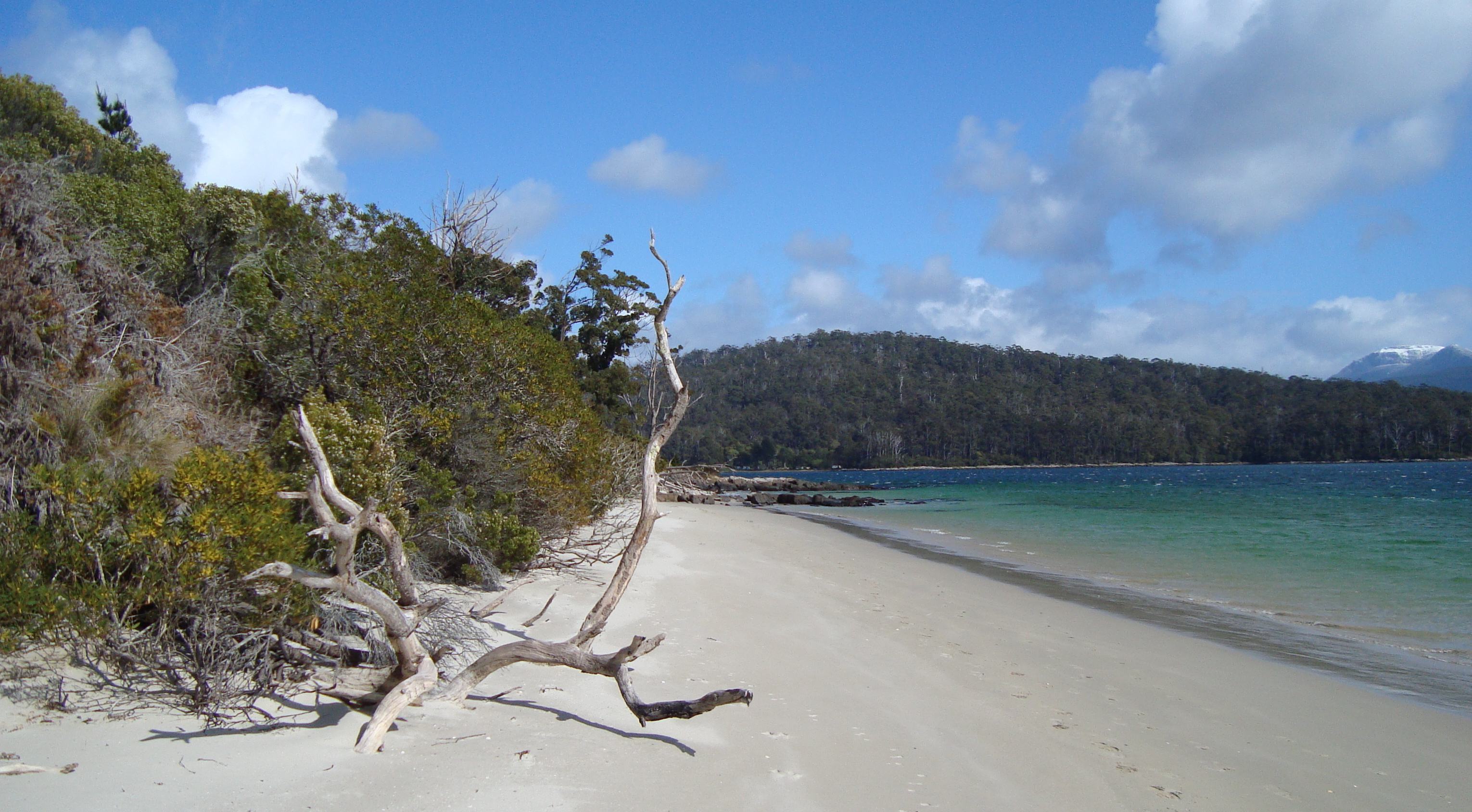
The safe haven Recherche Bay named by d'Entrecasteaux after one of his vessels

In 1792 over the 25 days of the first landfall in Recherche Bay, Tasmania, Delahaye established a European vegetable garden. Its purpose was as a source of food and propagation material for the indigenous people, and also as a supply of provisions for future visiting European vessels. This was the first European garden on mainland Tasmania, planted just north of where the ships were anchored and, until recently, was last sighted by Lady Jane Franklin in the 1840s. Offshore, on Bruny Island, a small orchard had been planted a few months previously by Englishman William Bligh's expedition, presumably planted by Bligh's gardener David Nelson. Delahaye's journal reports that he planted celery, chervil, chicory, cabbages, grey romaine lettuce, different kinds of turnip, white onion, radishes, sorrel, peas, black salsify and potatoes; he also had large quantities sewn in the woods, thrown at random where they might grow. Returning on 21 January 1793 the garden had not been productive, the seed having been planted in dry and sandy soil. This time Delahaye tried explaining to the Aboriginal people, referred to today as the Lyluequonny, that the tubers, when cooked in fire embers, made fine eating. Calling in on the Adventure Bay side of Bruny Island Delahaye examined and tended the two pomegranate, one quince and three fig trees planted by Bligh's expedition in 1792.

=== Rediscovery of garden in 2003 ===
On 4 February 2003, situated in the north-eastern peninsula of Recherche Bay, environmental activists Helen Gee and Bob Graham found moss-covered stones forming a rectangle roughly 9m x 7.7m subdivided into four rectangles and enclosing a "plinth" (suggested as a support for barrels of water) measuring 1.8m x 1.7m. This seemed the possible remains of the garden established by Delahaye in 1792. The site ("NE peninsula") was placed on the Tasmanian Heritage Register on 20 February 2003. The discovery was an important element in a protracted campaign to preserve the site and, indeed, the whole peninsula, which was then in private ownership, and under threat of being logged.

=== Heritage listing entry ===
In 2006 an archaeological survey of this site and others relating to the d'Entrecasteaux expedition concluded that:

The geophysical and archaeological study of the area around the stone feature as well as the soil sampling strategy and the close observation of the 1792-93 maps of the area suggest that the stone layout cannot be the garden of Delahaye. This study also indicated that the location of the garden shown on the maps is in a dry and rocky environment which does not fit he description of the French ... The stone layout found in 2002 is probably an uncompleted structure associated with the late 19th and early 20th century development of the area. It is obviously one of the few remaining witnesses of this part of the history of Coal Pit Bight and needs to be protected and further researched.

Archaeological work had failed to find artefacts and recognizable phytoliths, also the site seemed too close to the sea – even though the dimensions, layout and orientation approximated published descriptions by both Delahaye and Labillardière.

The study also resulted in a Provisional Entry to the Tasmanian Heritage Register of 1 April 2010 D'Entrecasteaux Expedition Sites Recherche Bay & Adventure Bay:

1792 Garden (Lot 2). Exact location has not been identified. It is believed to be located in woodland near an intermittent stream, approximately 1 km north of Bennetts Point and 120 m inland (approx AGD66 E492782 N5180132), which is about 70-100 metres to the south-east of the stone structure discovered in 2002 (Galipaud et al 2007: 58 and 129). The site of the 1792 garden is thought to be an area of flat land near to a small stream, with deep and clayish soil (Galipaud 2007:58). Traces of the garden might today be covered by alluvial deposits (Galipaud et al 2007:58).

== Transporting breadfruit to the French East Indies ==
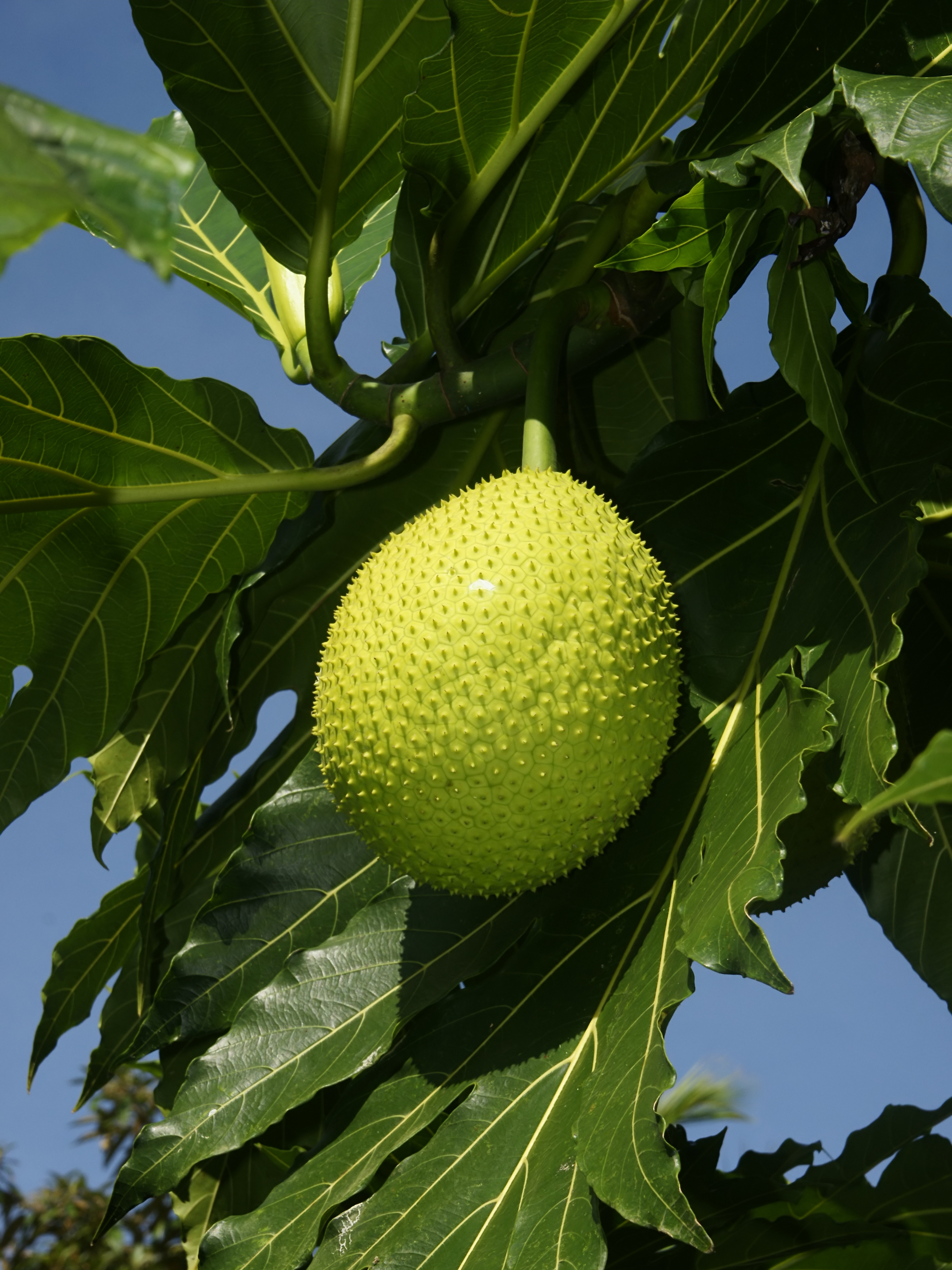
Breadfruit, Artocarpus altilis (fruit)

After several weeks of productive botanising in Recherche Bay, in 1793 the expedition ships set sail for Tongatapu (main island in the kingdom of Tonga) where Delahaye had specific instructions to collect quality breadfruit plants for transport to the Isle de France. The plants he selected were maintained in specially designed rectangular wooden chests with drainage holes and a frame that would hold glass or grills to assist temperature regulation. Accordingly, in Tonga he collected 200 breadfruit plants, emulating similar work of David Nelson, gardener-botanist to British Captain Bligh on the Bounty. By the time the French reached Sourabaya in Java only 14 plants survived and this was reduced to 10 when Delahaye moved to Semarang about another 300 kilometres away. By careful care and layering (a means of propagation) he managed to double the number of plants before leaving Java in January 1797 for the Isle de France on the frigate Régénérée. He then cared for the plants at sea eventually delivering them to Jean-Nicolas Céré at the Jardin des Pamplemousses on the Isle de France. Here they prospered under his care until he returned to France. Thanks to Delahaye's careful husbandry the breadfruit was subsequently successfully introduced to the French West Indies. Between March and April 1797 on the Isle de France he had collected 280 separately numbered plant specimens and these were added to his specimens and seed collected in Java and seed collected in Australia. When he left the island in May 1797 among his collections were a selection of live ornamental plants that he had collected from gardens on the Isle de France.

When the collections from the expedition were finally returned to Paris they filled 36 trunks and among the living plants brought back were two breadfruit trees.

== Subsequent work ==
Delahaye had departed Mauritius in May 1797, arriving in France and on 9 July to be appointed as an official on a commission sent to Italy to plunder the libraries and museums of northern Italy in the wake of Napoleon's victories there. On his return he was appointed head gardener, first at Trianon in 1798 and then, in 1805, on the Empress Joséphine's estate at Malmaison. A Scotsman, Alexander Howatson, had been appointed Head Gardener at Malmaison. Napoleon did not like having an Englishman as an employee and being presented with an excessive bill by Howatson for transportation of shrubs to Malmaison, Napoleon had an opportunity to dispense with his services. The post of Superintendent of the Château de Malmaison gardens was given to the botanist Charles de Mirbel. It was through de Mirbel that Delahaye had obtained the position of Head Gardener at Malmaison, based on his successful restoration of the gardens at Le Trianon and also Marie Antoinette's old garden at Versailles. This garden was probably the most important collection of living Australian plants in Europe in this period. For several decades Delahaye was the only gardener in Europe who had actually seen the plants from New Holland growing in their natural habitat, and many of the plants he grew he had collected himself. Although tensions developed between Delahaye and Empress Josephine's chief botanist, Aimé Bonpland, Delahaye continued to work for Empress Joséphine until her death in 1814 after which he entered business (possibly in 1826 when Malmaison was sold) as manager of a successful private nursery at Montreuil, near Versailles, which also occupied his wife and sons. Here he kept a collection of natural history specimens and an extensive herbarium together with seeds and ethnographic specimens brought back from his voyage.

Delahaye died at his home, 6 rue Symphorien, Versailles on 20 August 1829, aged 62, and was buried in the cemetery at Montreuil. He was survived by his wife, Anne Serreaux, two sons and a daughter. His daughter married Pierre Bertin who took over the business, handing it on to his son Émile Bertin who, in turn, passed it on to Jean-Jaques Moser.

== Plant collections ==
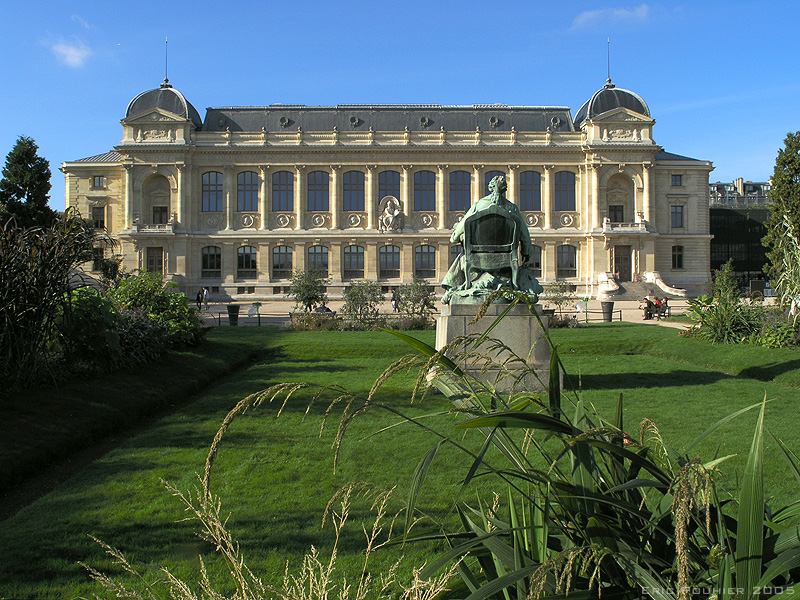
The Museum National d'Histoire Naturelle, repository of Delahaye's journal and most of his dried plants

An extensive collection of living and dried plants was returned to Paris by Delahaye but these were scattered after his death, herbarium specimens now being housed in Paris, Geneva, Mauritius and Java. His original herbarium of 2,699 plants included specimens dated and numbered in his journal as follows: New Ireland (Bismarck Archipelago, Jul 17–24 1792, collection numbers 699-786); Ambon (Sept 6 – Oct 12, 1792, nos. 787-1113), Boeroe (Sept 3–5, 1793, nos 1517-1669), Sourabaya, East Java (Oct 29 1793–Aug 1794, nos 1670-1962), Java (from 1794–96, nos 1963-2296), Batavia, west Java (Jun 1796–Jan 1797, nos 2297-2419) and the remainder from Isle de France.

On 16 August 1879 the Museum National d'Histoire Naturelle purchased his herbarium, 84-folio catalogue and journal from the antiquarian bookseller Pironin for 295 francs. A small collection of seeds was also donated to the L'École Nationale Supérieure d'Horticulture by Delahaye's grandson Émile Bertin. A manuscript of his seed collections is held in the Museum library (Notes des graines récoltées dans le voyage autour du monde).

== Honours ==
The name "Lahaie" is commemorated on the Liénard obelisk in the Jardin des Pamplemousses, Mauritius. D'Entrecasteaux named an island in Port Espérance (Tasmania) in Delahaye's honour, but it is now known as Hope Island. He was also commemorated by d'Entrecasteaux in a cape in the D'Entrecasteaux Islands.

== See also ==
- List of gardener-botanist explorers of the Enlightenment
- European and American voyages of scientific exploration

== Bibliography ==
- Brosse, Jacques (1983). Great Voyages of Exploration. The Golden Age of Discovery in the Pacific. Transl. Stanley Hochman. Sydney: Doubleday. ISBN 0-86824-182-2.
- Duyker, Edward (2003). Citizen Labillardière. A Naturalist's Life in Revolution and Exploration (1755–1834). Melbourne: Miegunyah Press. ISBN 0-522-85010-3.
- Duyker, Edward (2005). "A French Garden in Tasmania: The Legacy of Félix Delahaye (1767–1829)". In Cropp, Glynnis M.; Noel R. Watts; Roger D. J. Collins; K. R. Howe (eds.). Pacific Journeys: Essays in Honour of John Dunmore. Wellington: Victoria University Press. pp. 21–35. ISBN 0-86473-507-3.
- Galipaud, Jean-Christophe; et al. (2007). The Recherche Bay d'Entrecasteaux Visit in 1792 and 1793: A Tasmanian-French Collaboration Archaeological Project (2006). Final Report to the Tasmanian and French Governments. Hobart: Heritage Tasmania. ISBN 978-0-7246-6992-9.
- Guillaumin, André (1910). "Un Membre Méconnu de l'Expedition à la Rechereche de La Pérouse: le Jardinier Lahaie". Bull. Mus. Hist. Nat. Paris. 16: 356–358.
- Guillaumin, André (1922). "Notice Complémentaire sur le Jardinier Delahaye (Alias Lahaie)". Bull. Mus. Hist. Nat. Paris. 28: 109–110.
- Gunn, Mary; Codd, Leslie E (1981). Botanical Exploration of Southern Africa. Cape Town: A.A. Balkema. ISBN 0-86961-129-1.
- Hamilton, Jill (1998). Napoleon, the Empress and the Artist. London: Simon & Schuster. ISBN 0-7318-0834-7.
- Horner, Frank (1995). Looking for La Prouse. D'Entrecasteaux in Australia and the South Pacific 1792–1793. Melbourne: Miegunyah Press. ISBN 0-522-84451-0.
- Mulvaney, John (2007). The Axe had Never Sounded': Place, People and Heritage of Recherche Bay, Tasmania. Canberra: ANU E Press and Aboriginal History. ISBN 978-1-921313-20-2.
- Richard, Hélèn (1986). Le voyage d'Entrecasteaux á la recherche de Lapérouse. Paris: Editions du Comité des Travaux Historiques et Scientifiques.
- van Steenis, Cornelis Gijsbert Gerrit Jan; van Steenis-Kruseman, Maria Johanna (1974). "Cyclopaedia of Collectors". Flora Malesiana. 1 (1): 307.
- Fawcett, T (2007). "'Tasmania's first gardener'". Australian Garden History. 18 (3): 4–7.
