= Kermadec =

Kermadec or de Kermadec may refer to:

== Geography ==
- Kermadec Islands, a subtropical island arc in the South Pacific Ocean northeast of New Zealand
- Kermadec Plate, a long narrow tectonic plate located west of the Kermadec Trench
- Kermadec Trench, one of Earth's deepest oceanic trenches, reaching a depth of 10047 m
- Kermadec-Tonga subduction zone, a convergent plate boundary
- Tonga-Kermadec Ridge, an oceanic ridge in the south-west Pacific Ocean

== People ==
- Eugène de Kermadec (1899–1976), French painter
- François Pierre Huon de Kermadec (1726–1787), French Navy officer
- Gil de Kermadec (1922–2011), French tennis player
- Jean-Marie Huon de Kermadec (1747–1796), French Navy officer
- Jean-Michel Huon de Kermadec (1748–1792), French navigator
- Liliane de Kermadec (1928–2020), French film director and screenwriter

== See also ==
- Kermadecia
