= Rosselia =

Conservation status
- Critically Endangered (IUCN 3.1)

Scientific classification
- Kingdom: Plantae
- Clade: Tracheophytes
- Clade: Angiosperms
- Clade: Eudicots
- Clade: Rosids
- Order: Sapindales
- Family: Burseraceae
- Genus: Rosselia; Forman
- Species: R. bracteata

Binomial name
- Rosselia bracteata Forman

Genus of flowering plants

Rosselia is a genus of plants in the family Burseraceae. The sole species is Rosselia bracteata, endemic to Papua New Guinea. It is a tree and grows primarily in the wet tropical biome(s).

Both the genus and the species were circumscribed by Lewis Leonard Forman in Kew Bull. vol.49 on page 603 in 1994.

The genus name of Rosselia is named after Rossel Island which was named in honour of Élisabeth-Paul-Édouard de Rossel (1765–1829), French astronomer and Master-at-arms. He was on the frigate 'La Recherche' with Joseph Antoine Raymond Bruny d'Entrecasteaux on the search for the missing La Pérouse expedition, which was later written in 1809.
