= Jean François Sylvestre Denis de Trobriand =

- Born: 7 June 1765; Finistère, France
- Died: 16 March 1799 (aged 33); Saint-Domingue, Haiti
- Occupations: Naval Officer; Explorer
- Title: Commander

Jean François Sylvestre Denis de Trobriand (7 June 1765 – 16 March 1799) was a French naval officer and navigator who particularly distinguished himself during the expedition of d'Entrecasteaux to Australasia (1791–94). The Trobriand Islands in Papua New Guinea were named after him.

== Biography ==
Born in Finistère, Trobriand came from an aristocratic family from Brittany. He was one of three children of Jean François Sylvestre Denis, count of Trobriand (1729–1810) and Jeanne Charlotte Le Gris du Clos (1735–?). He joined the French Navy and became a midshipman in 1780, initially serving under Bougainville and taking part in the American War of Independence.

In 1791, he embarked as a first lieutenant on the Espérance, a ship captained by Jean-Michel de Kermadec. Espérance was one of two vessels of an expedition mounted by d'Entrecasteaux, to search for an earlier expedition led by Jean-François de La Pérouse, which had not been heard from since 1788. The d'Entrecasteaux expedition explored parts of the Australian coast, Tasmania, New Caledonia, the Solomon Islands, Vanuatu, and, in what is now Papua New Guinea, the Admiralty Islands, before heading to Ambon in the Moluccas to take on supplies. It then returned towards Australia. The death of Kermadec in New Caledonia led to a decision to return to France. En route, the ships passed through the Louisiade Archipelago whose islands include some subsequently named after Trobriand.

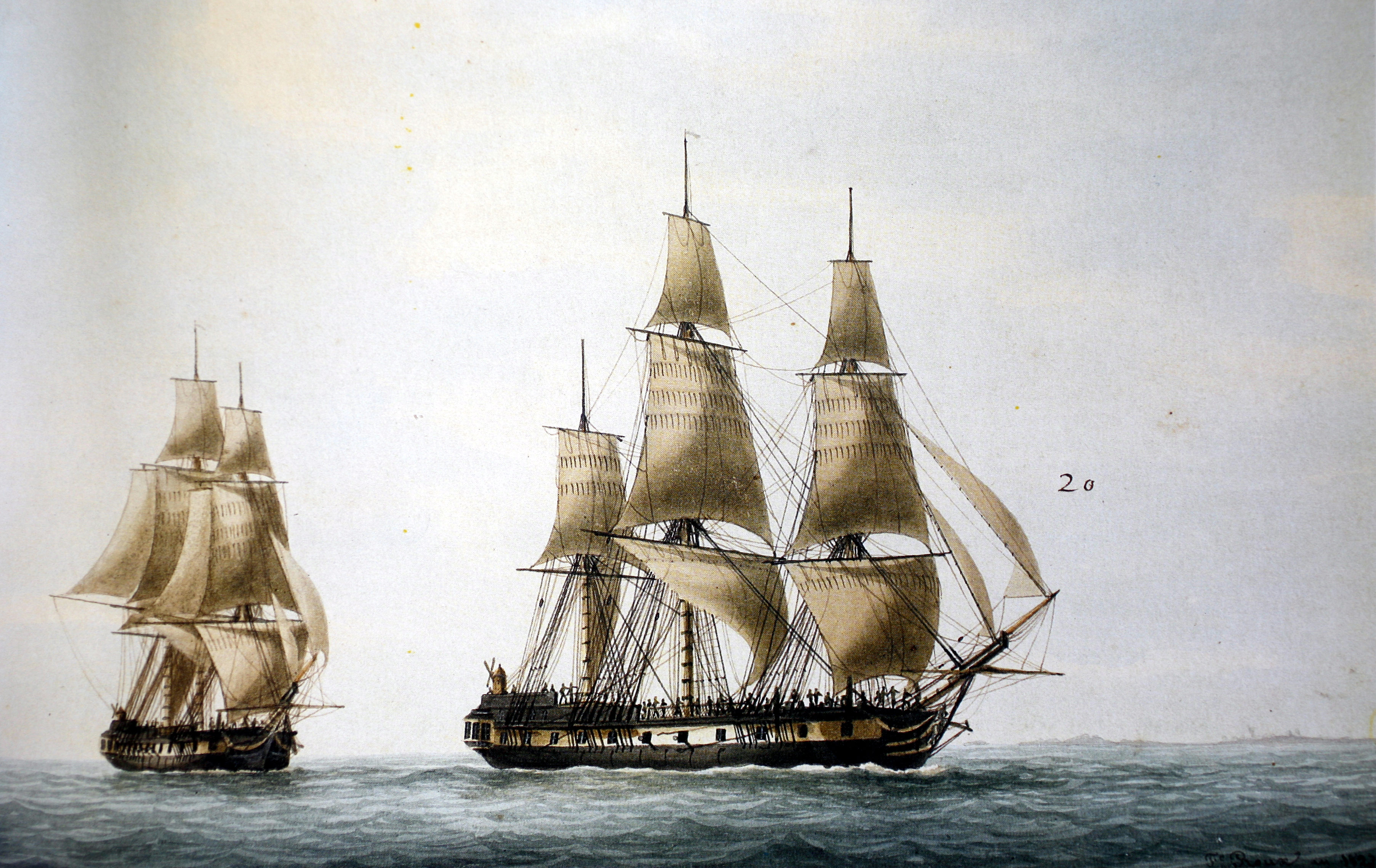
A painting by François Roux, depicting Espérance (centre), on which de Trobriand served as a first lieutenant

Visiting Surabaya on their way back to France, and unaware of the Franco-Dutch War, the surviving crews of both vessels were detained and their ships confiscated and broken up. Trobriand was taken to the Netherlands and only returned to France in 1797. There he was appointed Commander and sailed for Saint-Domingue, where he died in 1799, possibly as a result of poisoning ordered by Toussaint Louverture during the Haitian Revolution.
