= Recherche Bay =

Bay in south-eastern Tasmania, Australia

Recherche Bay (Leillateah)
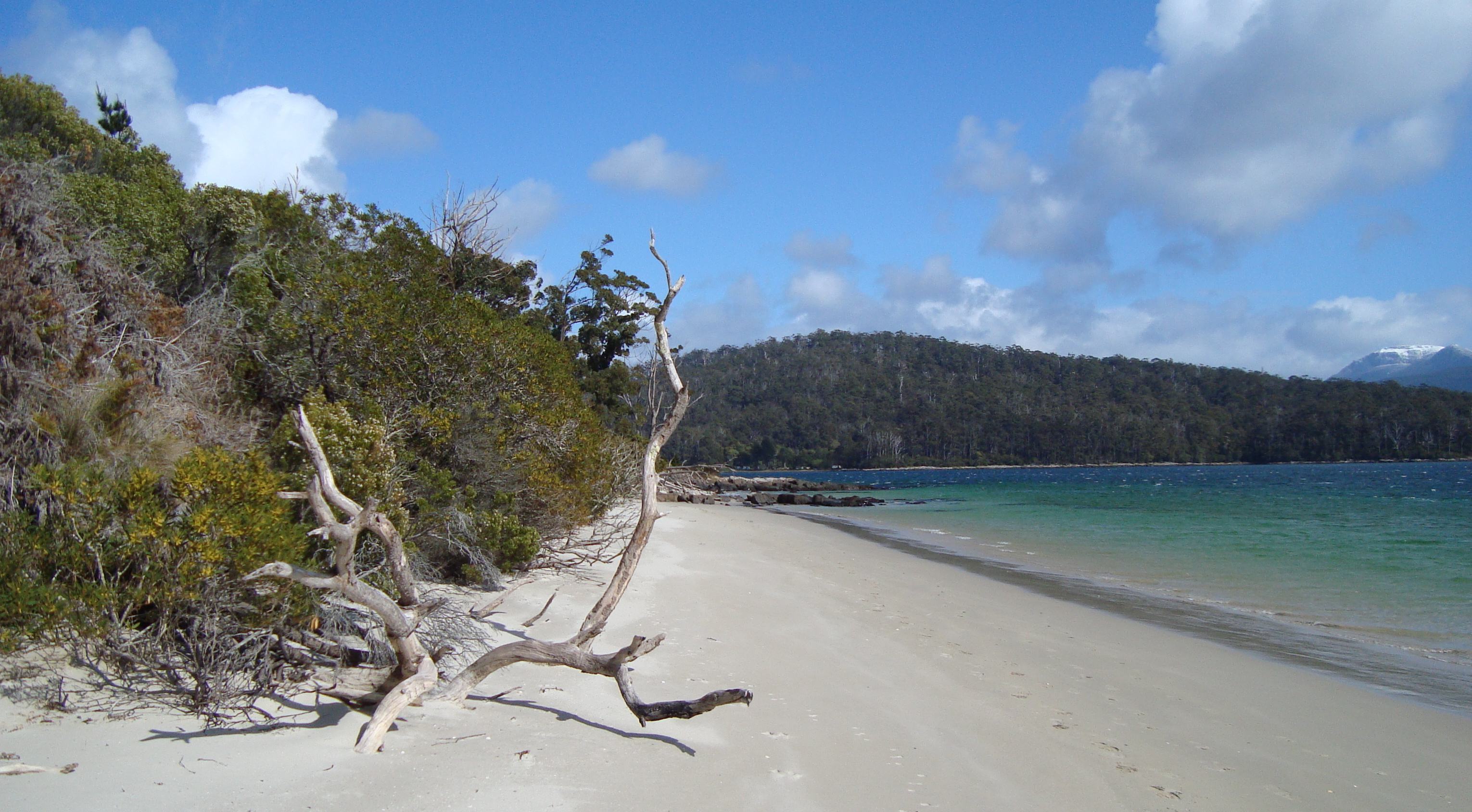
- A beach on Recherche Bay near Cockle Creek

- Location in Tasmania
- Location: Southern Tasmania
- Coordinates: 43°32′S 146°54′E
- Etymology: Recherche
- Ocean/sea sources: Southern Ocean
- Basin countries: Australia
- Designation: Australian National Heritage List

Recherche Bay (locally /ˈri.sərtʃ/ REE-sərtch) is an oceanic embayment, part of which is listed on the National Heritage Register, located on the extreme south-eastern corner of Tasmania, Australia. It was a landing place of the d’Entrecasteaux expedition to find missing explorer La Pérouse. It is named in honour of the Recherche, one of the expedition's ships. The Nuenonne name for the bay is Leillateah. The bordering land is the locality of Recherche, in the local government area of Huon Valley in the South-east region of Tasmania.

== Nuenonne people ==
The original inhabitants of the region were the Nuenonne people of Aboriginal Tasmanians. They were a maritime people who constructed durable catamarans that enabled sea journeys to places such as Bruny and the Maatsuyker Islands. The famous Nuenonne woman, Truganini, was born at Recherche Bay. The Nuenonne were either killed, died of introduced disease, or removed from the region during the early stages of British colonisation. By the mid 1830s, Indigenous habitation of Recherche Bay ceased.

== French exploration ==
French explorers set up a camp, made a garden and scientific observatory at Recherche Bay in April 1792 for 26 days, and again in January 1793 for 24 days. Both landings were made to seek refuge and replenish supplies although as much time as possible was dedicated to scientific research. The botanists Jacques Labillardière, Claude Riche and Étienne Pierre Ventenat, assisted by gardener botanist Félix Delahaye, collected and catalogued almost 5000 specimens including the blue gum (Eucalyptus globulus), which later became Tasmania's floral emblem. The expedition also made friendly contact with the Tasmanian Aboriginal people there in 1793.

The scientific observatory at Recherche Bay was the site of the first deliberate scientific experiment on Australian soil. At this observatory, geoscientist Elisabeth Paul Edouard de Rossel conducted a series of measurements that proved geomagnetism varied with latitude.

It will be difficult to describe my feelings at the sight of this solitary harbour situateted at the extremeties of the globe, so perfectly enclosed that one feels separated from the rest of the universe. Everything is influenced by the wilderness of the rugged landscape. With each step, one encounters the beauties of unspoilt nature, with signs of decrepitude, trees reaching a very great height, and of corresponding diameter, are devoid of branches along the trunk, but crowned with an everlasting green foliage. Some of these trees seem as ancient as the world, and are so tightly interlaced that they are impenetrable.

— Bruni d'Entrecasteaux, Recherche Bay, January 1793.

== British exploration and settlement ==
British exploration of the bay started in the early 1800s with whalers frequently using the bay as a temporary refuge. The maritime explorer, James Kelly, attempted to land at Recherche Bay in late 1815 but was prevented by a large group of Nuenonne people who threw volleys of stones and spears at them.

George Augustus Robinson led the first European overland expedition through the region in 1830.

Being isolated from the main areas of early settlement, exposed to westerly gales, and the terrain and soils of a nature that discouraged European agriculture, Recherche Bay saw only moderate activity following the British settlement of Van Diemen's Land.

In 1829, Recherche Bay was the site of the Cyprus mutiny, in which the brig Cyprus was seized by convicts being transported from Hobart Town to Macquarie Harbour Penal Station. The mutineers marooned officers, soldiers, and convicts who did not join the mutiny, without supplies. The mutineers then sailed the Cyprus to Canton, China, where they scuttled her and claimed to be castaways from another vessel. On the way, Cyprus visited Japan during the height of the period of severe Japanese restrictions on the entry of foreigners, the first Australian ship to do so.

During the 1830s and 1840s, the bay was the site of up to five bay whaling stations. it was also a base for pilots guiding ships up the D'Entrecasteaux Channel. Whaling ships often sheltered there from wild weather, or to try-out whales. Two whalers, the Maria Orr, in 1846, and Offley, in 1880, were wrecked there in gales. The main commercial activities in the later 19th century and into the early 20th century were timber-gathering, mostly centred on the township of Leprena and coal mining, the latter mostly based around the township of Catamaran. The Catamaran Coal Company employed the former barque James Craig as a coal hulk there.

== Reservation of the north east peninsula ==
In 2003 the private landowners of the D'Entrecasteaux expedition site sought permission to selectively log the area, which was opposed by a large-scale campaign to protect the site from destruction.

In January 2006 the Tasmanian Land Conservancy (TLC) announced plans to raise a minimum of A$1.3 million to purchase the site from its private owners. Dick Smith pledged A$100,000 to the cause, and two weeks later it was announced that over $2 million had been raised to purchase and rehabilitate the site, and that it would be owned by the TLC.

Part of the bay, being the north east peninsula area comprising 430 hectares (1,100 acres), was included in the National Heritage List on 7 October 2005.

== See also ==
- South Coast Tasmania
