= Esperance Bay =

Bay in Western Australia

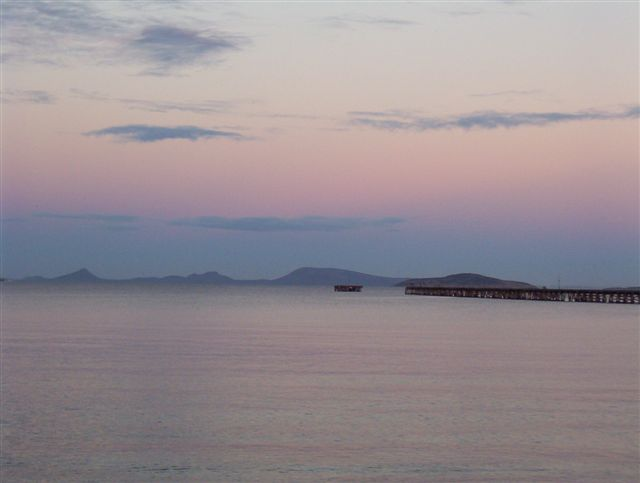
View from the shore

Esperance Bay is a bay on the south coast of Western Australia. Nominally located at 33°51′25″S 121°55′13″E, it is the site of the town of Esperance.

The bay was discovered on 9 December 1792 by a French expedition under Bruni d'Entrecasteaux, which sailed in search of the lost expedition of Jean-François de Galaup, comte de Lapérouse. Stormy weather had blown the ships into hazardous waters surrounded by islands, but acting ensign Jacques-Bertrand Le Grand sighted a navigable passage and a somewhat sheltered anchorage, providing what d'Entrecasteaux regarded as a "miraculous" escape from being wrecked. Ship botanist Jacques Labillardière was in favour of naming the bay after Le Grand, and indeed he refers to the bay on his specimen slips as "Baie Le Grand", but in the end d'Entrecasteaux decided to name the bay after one of his ships, the Espérance. The cape on the eastern side of the bay was named Cape Le Grand in Le Grand's honour.
