= French ship Bien-Aimé (1769) =

Ship of the line of the French Navy

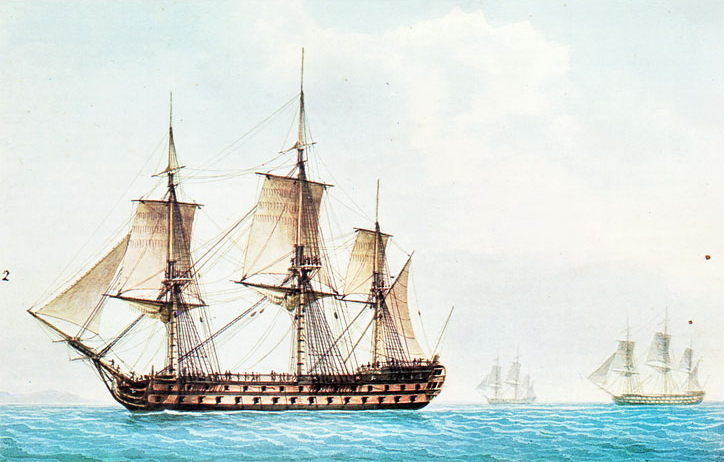
- Watercolour portrait of Bien-Aimé, by François Roux, commissioned by Willaumez

History

France
- Name: Bien-Aimé
- Ordered: 1769 or March 1770
- Builder: Lorient
- Laid down: March 1768
- Launched: 22 March 1769
- In service: November 1769
- Fate: Broken up 1785

General characteristics
- Class & type: Bien-Aimé class ship of the line
- Displacement: 2884 tonneaux
- Tons burthen: 1500 port tonneaux
- Length: 55.2 metres
- Beam: 14.1 metres
- Draught: 6.9 metres
- Sail plan: Full-rigged ship
- Armament: 74 guns:

Bien-Aimé was a 74-gun warship of the French Navy.

== Construction ==
Bien-Aimé was originally built for the French East India Company, but the French Navy acquired her before she was completed.

== Career ==
In 1777, Bien-Aimé was commanded by Captain de Bougainville. The next year, at the outbreak of the War of American Independence, she was part of the squadron under Admiral Lamotte-Picquet, and took part in the action of 2 May 1781.

On 24 April 178, Bien-Aimé departed Brest, under François Pierre Huon de Kermadec, in the squadron of Admiral Lamotte-Picquet, along with the 110-gun Invincible, the 74-gun Actif, and the 64-gun ships Alexandre, Hardi and Lion, and the frigates Sibylle and Néréide, and cutters Chasseur and Levrette.

== Fate ==
Bien-Aimé was struck from the Navy lists in 1784, and broken up the year after.
