= Claude Riche =

French naturalist

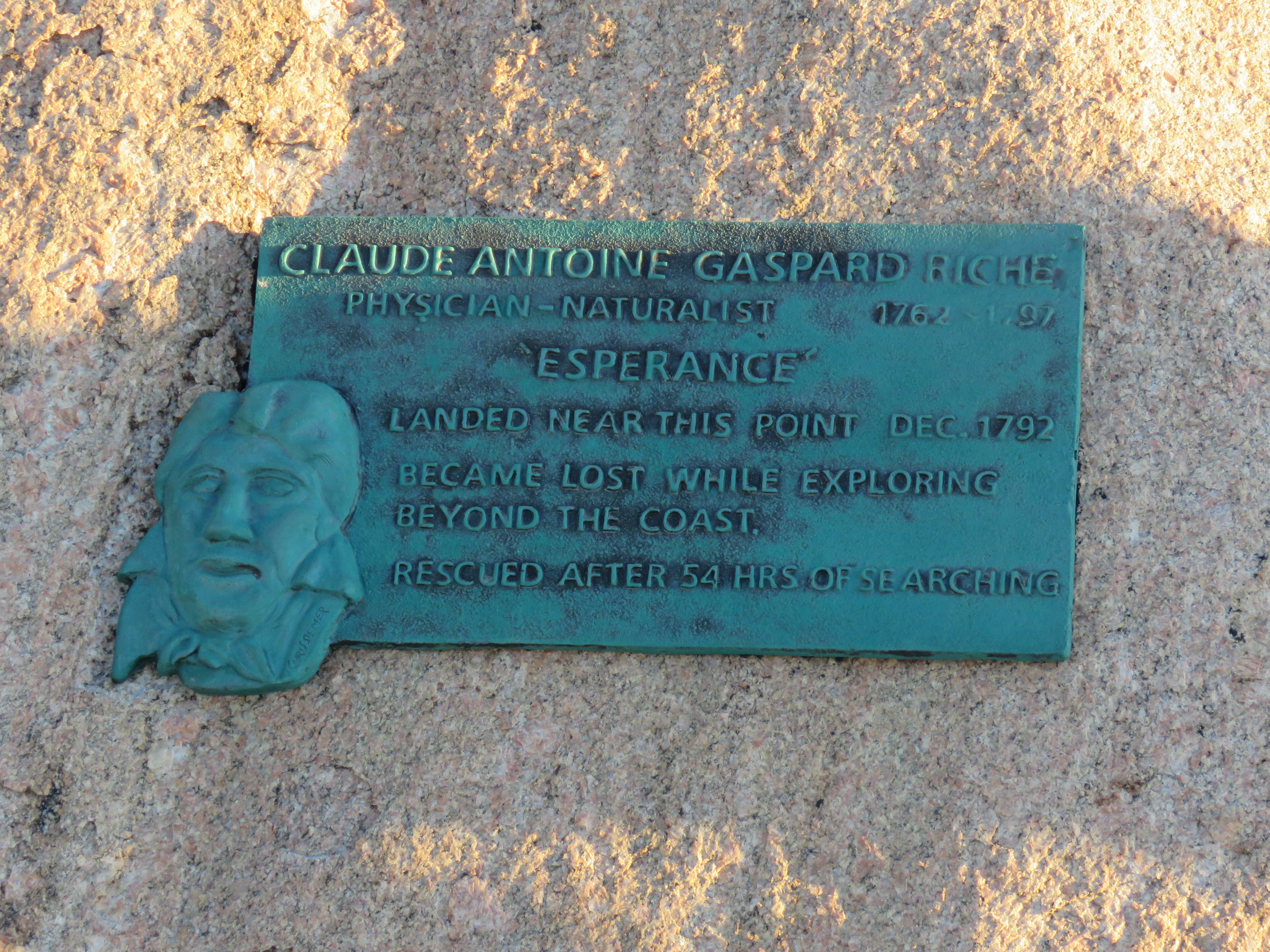
A plaque commemorating Riche's December 1792 landing in Esperance, Western Australia

Claude-Antoine-Gaspard Riche (20 August 1762 – 5 September 1797) was a naturalist on Bruni d'Entrecasteaux's 1791 expedition in search of the lost ships of Jean-François de Galaup, comte de La Pérouse.

Cape Riche, on the south coast of Australia, is named in his honour.

== Early life ==
Claude Riche was born in Chamelet in Beaujolais in France in 1762. His father was an official of the Parliament of Dombes. He was educated at Lyons and then Montpelier, where he studied medicine, apparently without parental approval.

== Education ==
Riche received his doctorate in 1787, after botanical and geological studies in the mountains of Languedoc, Riche moved to Paris in 1788. He co-authored the section on comparative anatomy with Félix Vicq d’Azyr for the Encyclopedie Méthodique and was the founding secretary of the Société Philomatique. He is also believed to have been a member of the Club Jacobin in the early years of the Revolution.

== Career ==
In 1791 he was elected a member of the Société d’histoire naturelle and in the same year joined Bruni d'Entrecasteaux's voyage in search of Jean-François de Galaup, comte de La Pérouse. The expedition visited Tenerife, Cape of Good Hope, Van Diemen's Land (Tasmania), New Ireland, Admiralty Islands, Ambon, Esperance Bay (Western Australia), Van Diemen's Land again, Tongatapu and Balade (New Caledonia) before disintegrating on royalist and republican lines in the Dutch East Indies on receiving news of the execution of Louis XVI.

Riche appears to have been consumptive and sought appointment as a naturalist on the Espérance because he believed the sea air would benefit his condition. It is also said that he wished to impress the family of a young woman with whom he was in love. Riche’s main responsibilities were the study of minerals, birds and invertebrates, but he also assumed responsibility for meteorological observations and chemical studies. During the expedition’s sojourn at Esperance he became separated from his colleagues for two days and was nearly given up for dead.

Like Labillardière, Riche lost his collections when the expedition disintegrated in the Dutch East Indies. He was allowed to sail for the Ile-de-France (Mauritius) on the Scagen on 18 July 1794 (in company with Willaumez, Legrand, Laignel, Ventenat and nineteen other crew members). With the assistance of Governor Maures de Malartic’s of the Isle de France (now Mauritius), Riche returned to Batavia in November 1794 on the Nathalie (Captaine Brion), under a flag of truce and carrying Dutch prisoners of war) in the hope of retrieving his papers and collections. Alas, the Dutch ignored his requests and he departed Batavia again on 29 March 1795, on the Nathalie, but nevertheless after having secured the release of Jacques Labillardière, the artist Jean Piron and some fifty other crew members from the original expedition.

He returned to France in June 1796 and died the following year at Mont Dore in the Auvergne.

== See also ==
- European and American voyages of scientific exploration
