= Jean-Marie Huon de Kermadec =

Jean-Marie Huon de Kermadec (Brest, 15 August 1747 — Brest, 31 May 1796) was a French Navy officer.

== Career ==
Kermadec was born to the family of Anne François du Mesacm de Mescaradec and of Jean Guillaume Huon de Kermadec. He was the brother of Jean-Michel Huon de Kermadec, and nephew of François Pierre Huon de Kermadec.

Kermadec joined the Navy as a Garde-Marine on 12 January 1766. He was promoted to Lieutenant on 13 March 1779.

Serving on the 74-gun Annibal, in the division under Suffren, Kermadec took part in the Battle of Porto Praya. He was wounded by a bullet to the thigh, but refused to receive medical attention before the fighting was over. In February 1782, Kermadec transferred on the 40-gun frigate Pourvoyeuse. Later, he was given command of the 24-gun corvette Subtile and took part in the Battle of Negapatam on 6 July 1782. (Note: Cunat appears to have misread Kermadec's name as "Kermadie".)

== Sources and references ==
Notes

Bibliography

- Cunat, Charles (1852). Histoire du Bailli de Suffren. Rennes: A. Marteville et Lefas. p. 447.
- Lacour-Gayet, Georges (1910). La marine militaire de la France sous le règne de Louis XVI. Paris: Honoré Champion.

External links

- Rouxel, Jean-Christophe. "Jean Marie HUON de KERMADEC". Parcours de vies dans la Royale.
