= François Pierre Huon de Kermadec =

- Born: c. 1726
- Died: 15 May 1787; Brest, France
- Military career
- Rank: Chef d'escadre
- Unit: French Navy
- Awards: Knight of the Royal and Military Order of Saint Louis

François Pierre Huon de Kermadec (circa 1726 – Brest, 15 May 1787) was a French Navy officer.

== Career ==
Kermadec was born to the family of Vincent Huon de Kermadec, also a Navy officer. He was the uncle of Jean-Marie Huon de Kermadec and Jean-Michel Huon de Kermadec.

On 24 April 1781, Kermadec departed Brest, captaining the 74-gun Bien-Aimé in the squadron of Admiral Lamotte-Picquet, along with the 110-gun Invincible, the 74-gun Actif, and the 64-gun ships Alexandre, Hardi and Lion, and the frigates Sibylle and Néréide and cutters Chasseur and Levrette.

In 1782, Kermadec was part of a large inquiry into French commanders after the Battle of the Saintes. The verdict, rendered on 21 May 1784, absolved most of the officers.

== Sources and references ==
Bibliography

- Lacour-Gayet, Georges (1910). La marine militaire de la France sous le règne de Louis XVI. Paris: Honoré Champion.
- Rouxel, Jean-Christophe. "François-Pierre HUON de KERMADEC". Parcours de vies dans la Royale.
