= Henri Peyroux de la Coudrenière =

Henri Peyroux de la Coudrenière (1743–18??), also spelled Coudrenaire, was a French politician and author who is perhaps best known for his scheme to transport the exiled Acadians from France to Louisiana, from which the people known as Cajuns are descended.

== Biography ==
Henri Peyroux de la Coudrenière was born in Mortagne-sur-Sèvre, Poitou, France to Charles Peyroux, an apothecary and surgeon, and Marguerite Suzanne Joudad.

Peyroux conceived the idea of resettling the Acadians who had been exiled by the British to Spanish Louisiana. Securing a commission and pension from Spain, he took the Acadian exile, Olivier Terrio, as a business partner, and together they worked with French and Spanish officials, as well as with the Acadian exiles, to coordinate the resettlement project. Complications arose when, for instance, Peyroux was arrested by French officials, as a secret agent of Spain; in fact, the arrest had been arranged by French merchants who did not wish the Acadian exiles to depart without paying off their mounting debts. After numerous financial and bureaucratic setbacks, approximately 1,600 Acadian exiles sailed for Louisiana between May and October 1785.

Henri Peyroux also went to Louisiana, where he benefited from his commissions as a captain in the Spanish Army and a commandant of the post at Sainte-Geneviève in Spanish Illinois, now Missouri. Having succeeded in resettling the French-exiled Acadians, Peyroux betrayed his partner, Terrio, refusing to compensate him for his services.

Around 1784–85, Peyroux wrote a "memoir on the advantages to be gained for the Spanish crown by the settlement of Van Diemen's Land. After receiving no response from the Spanish government, Peyroux proposed it to the French government, as "Mémoire sur les avantages qui résulteraient d'une colonie puissante à la terre de Diémen".
