= Jean-Michel Huon de Kermadec =

French Navy officer (1748–1793)

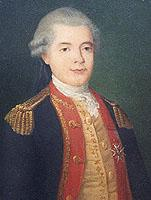
- Born: 12 September 1748; Bohars, France
- Died: 6 May 1793 (aged 44) Balade, New Caledonia
- Branch: French Navy
- Rank: captain
- Conflicts: American War of Independence; Battle of Ushant; Capture of Grenada; Siege of Savannah

Jean-Michel Huon de Kermadec (12 September 1748 – 6 May 1793) was a French Navy officer. He took part in voyages of exploration in the Pacific Ocean under Bruni d'Entrecasteaux, looking for the lost expedition of Jean-François de La Pérouse.

== Biography ==
=== Early life ===
Kermadec was born on 12 September 1748 in Bohars, near the city of Brest in France, into a Breton family of old nobility, to Jean-Guillaume Huon de Kermadec and his wife Anne née du Mescam. His family had a long naval tradition, as both his father and grand-father were also Navy officers. His brother, Jean-Marie Huon de Kermadec, and uncle, François Pierre Huon de Kermadec, were also Navy officers.

=== Naval career ===
He served in the American War of Independence, and saw action at the Battle of Ushant in 1778 and the following year was serving aboard the Diadème during the Capture of Grenada and the Siege of Savannah.

In 1781, he was made a Knight in the Order of Saint Louis.

Joining the ship Résolution in 1785, Kermadec was second in command to Bruni d'Entrecasteaux on a voyage to China. He commanded his own ship, the Rhône in 1789 and later that year joined the Académie de Marine. From 1790 to 1791, he captained Patriote, part of the squadron under d'Entrecasteaux.

In September 1791 he was chosen to command the Espérance on d'Entrecasteaux's expedition to find the lost ships of Jean-François de La Pérouse. Kermandec supervised the preparations for the vessels selected for the expedition, his own Espérance and d'Entrecasteaux's Recherche.

Departing from Brest, Kermadec received a promotion to Captain on 29 September 1791. The expedition explored Tasmania, New Caledonia, New Guinea and the Santa Cruz Islands without finding any trace of La Perouse, before returning to Tasmania in January 1793. The expedition then sailed for Tonga and onto New Caledonia, where Kermadec died of tuberculosis on 6 May 1793 at Balade. He was discreetly buried on Poudioué, a nearby islet, to prevent the natives from tampering with the body.

== Legacy ==
The Kermadec Islands northeast of New Zealand are named for Huon de Kermadec, as are the Kermadec Trench, Kermandie, and the Kermandie River, both in Tasmania, Huonville, the Huon Valley, Huon River also all in Tasmania, and the Huon Peninsula and Huon Gulf of Papua New Guinea.

Several plants also bear his name, including the Huon pine (Lagarostrobos franklinii) of Tasmania, the Proteaceae genus Kermadecia of New Caledonia, and the tree Metrosideros kermadecensis of the Kermadec Islands.

== See also ==
- European and American voyages of scientific exploration
