= French flûte Espérance (1781) =

Rhône-class flûte of the French Navy

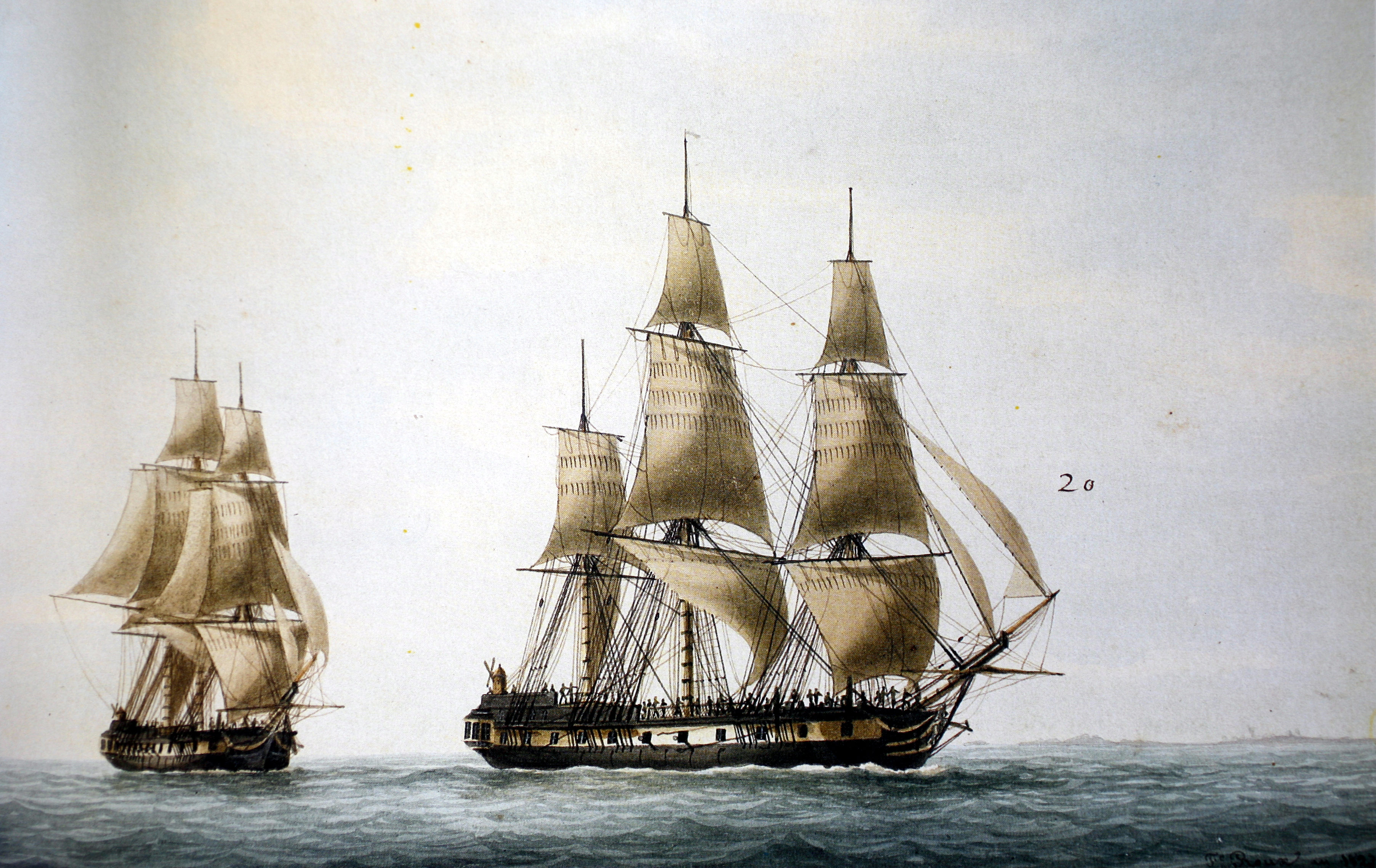
- The Recherche and Espérance, by François Roux

History

France
- Name: Espérance
- Namesake: Hope
- Builder: Toulon
- Laid down: June 1780
- Launched: 14 August 1781
- Christened: Durance
- Commissioned: 30 October 1781
- Out of service: 28 October 1794
- Reclassified: Frigate in 1791
- Fate: Sold for scrap

General characteristics
- Class & type: Rhône-class scow
- Displacement: c. 350 tonnes
- Length: 37 m (121 ft 5 in)
- Beam: 8.3 m (27 ft 3 in)
- Draught: 4.2 m (13 ft 9 in)
- Propulsion: Sail
- Sail plan: Full-rigged ship
- Complement: 200
- Armament: 6 × 8-pounders + two carronades
- Armour: Timber

Espérance (French pronunciation: [ɛspeʁɑ̃s]) was a Rhône-class flûte of the French Navy, launched in 1781 and later reclassified as a frigate. She earned fame as one of the ships of Bruni d'Entrecasteaux's expedition of 1791–92. Esperance Bay in Western Australia was named after her (and the later town of Esperance). She was sold for breaking up in 1794.

== Career ==
Espérance was built as Durance and served in Grasse's squadron as a troopship. On 18 December 1782, she sailed from Toulon with the frigates Précieuse and Prosélyte and the corvette Poulette, in a convoy bound for the Caribbean which also included the flûtes Gracieuse and Rhône.

A decade later, on 29 September 1791, Espérance under Captain Huon de Kermadec, together with Recherche, sailed from Brest to New Caledonia in the Pacific Ocean. They were on a mission under the command of Admiral Bruni d'Entrecasteaux in search of the explorer Lapérouse. The mission was unsuccessful: it was not until 1826 that the mystery of Laperouse's disappearance was solved.

== Fate ==
On 28 October 1793, Espérance was captured by the Dutch at Surabaya, only to be returned to France in February 1794. She was sold to Holland in September and sold for scrap two months later.

== See also ==
- European and American voyages of scientific exploration
