= French ship Recherche (1787) =

Marsouin class scow of the French Navy

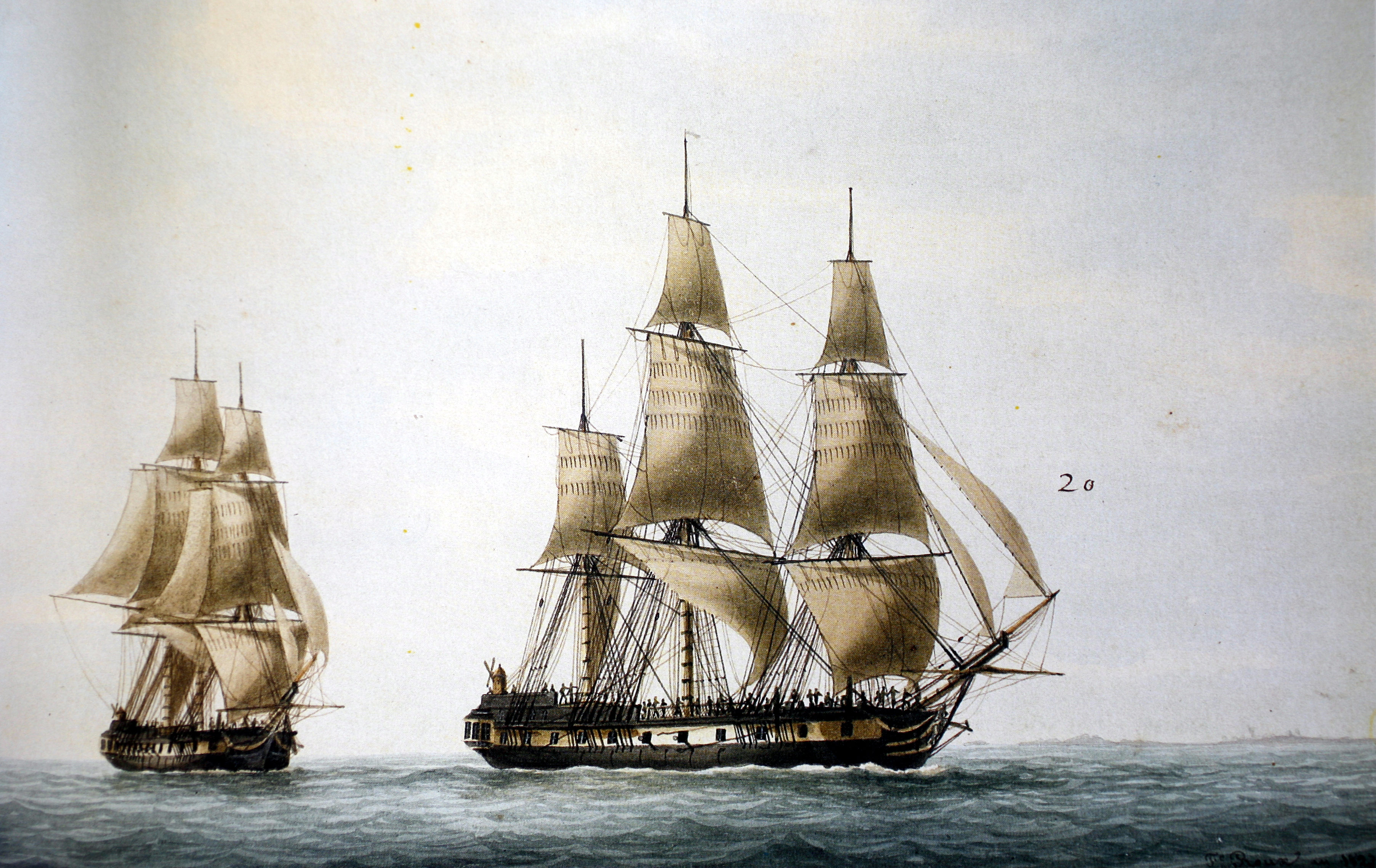
- The Recherche and Espérance, by François Roux

History

France
- Name: Recherche
- Namesake: Research
- Builder: Bayonne
- Laid down: March 1787
- Launched: October 1787
- Christened: Truite
- Commissioned: November 1787
- Out of service: September 1794
- Reclassified: Frigate in 1791
- Fate: Sold for scrap

General characteristics
- Class & type: Marsouin-class scow
- Displacement: c. 400 t (880,000 lb)
- Length: 36.4 m (119 ft 5 in)
- Beam: 9.1 m (29 ft 10 in)
- Draught: 3.9 m (12 ft 10 in)
- Propulsion: Sail
- Sail plan: Full-rigged ship
- Complement: 200
- Armament: 12 × 6-pounders
- Armour: Timber

Recherche ('research') was a 20-gun Marsouin-class scow of the French Navy, later reclassified as a 12-gun frigate. She earned fame as one of the ships of Bruni d'Entrecasteaux' expedition, along with Espérance ('hope'). Both Recherche Bay, Tasmania and the Recherche Archipelago, Western Australia were named after her.

== Career ==
The ship was built as Truite ('trout') and served under this name until July 1791, when she was renamed to Recherche and recommissioned as a 12-gun frigate.

She departed from Brest on 29 September 1791 for an exploration mission in search of Lapérouse, sailing to New Caledonia. Bruni d'Entrecasteaux died aboard on 21 July 1793.

== Fate ==
On 28 October 1793, Recherche was captured by the Dutch at Surabaya, only to be returned to France in February 1794. She was sold to Holland in September and sold for scrap two months later.

== See also ==
- European and American voyages of scientific exploration

== General references ==
- Roche, Jean-Michel (2005). Dictionnaire des bâtiments de la flotte de guerre française de Colbert à nos jours 1 1671–1870. p. 372. ISBN 978-2-9525917-0-6. OCLC 165892922.
