= HDMS Galathea (1831) =

Danish corvette

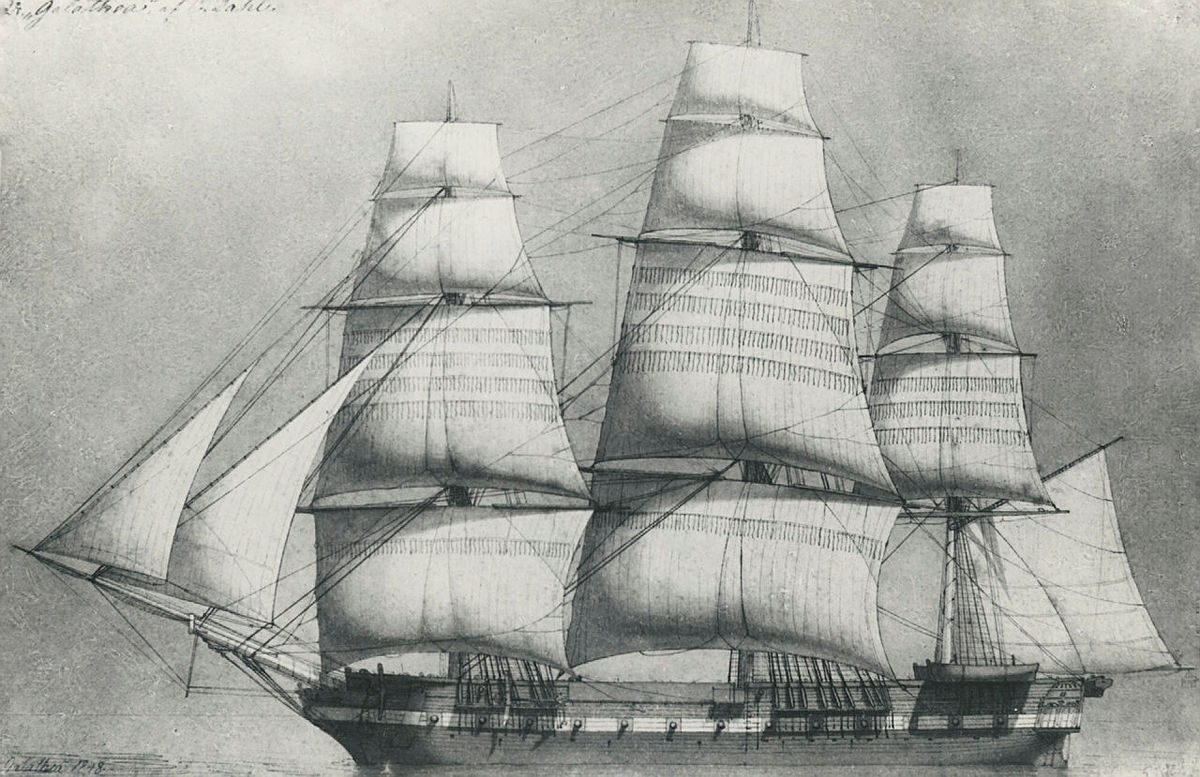
- HDMS Galathea by C. Fahl, 1818

History

Denmark
- Name: HDMS Galathea
- Builder: Danish Naval Shipyard, Gammelholm, Copenhagen; Constructor A. Schifter
- Yard number: 24
- Laid down: 2 April 1831
- Launched: 6 October 1831
- Commissioned: 1833
- Decommissioned: 4 July 1861
- Home port: Copenhagen

Denmark
- Name: Galathea
- Owner: Tradinghouse Mohr & Kjær
- In service: 1862
- Out of service: 1875
- Home port: Copenhagen

Norway
- Name: Galathea
- In service: 1875
- Out of service: 1889
- Home port: Arendal
- Fate: Wrecked at Oran, Algeria in 1889

General characteristics
- Class & type: Corvette
- Length: 43.5 m (143 ft)
- Beam: 10.5 m (34 ft)
- Draught: 4.5 m (15 ft)
- Sail plan: Full-rigged ship, 1560 m^{2}
- Speed: up to 11 knots
- Complement: 216
- Armament: 26 × 18 pound cannons, 6 × 4 pound howitzer

HDMS Galathea was a three-masted corvette of the Royal Danish Navy, constructed at Gammelholm to designs by Andreas Shifter in 1831. She is above all remembered for being the ship that undertook the First Galathea Expedition, 1845–1847. On two occasions, first in 1833 and later in 1839, Galathea was also instrumental in picking some of Bertel Thorvaldsen's artworks up in Rome and bringing them back to Denmark.

== Construction and design ==
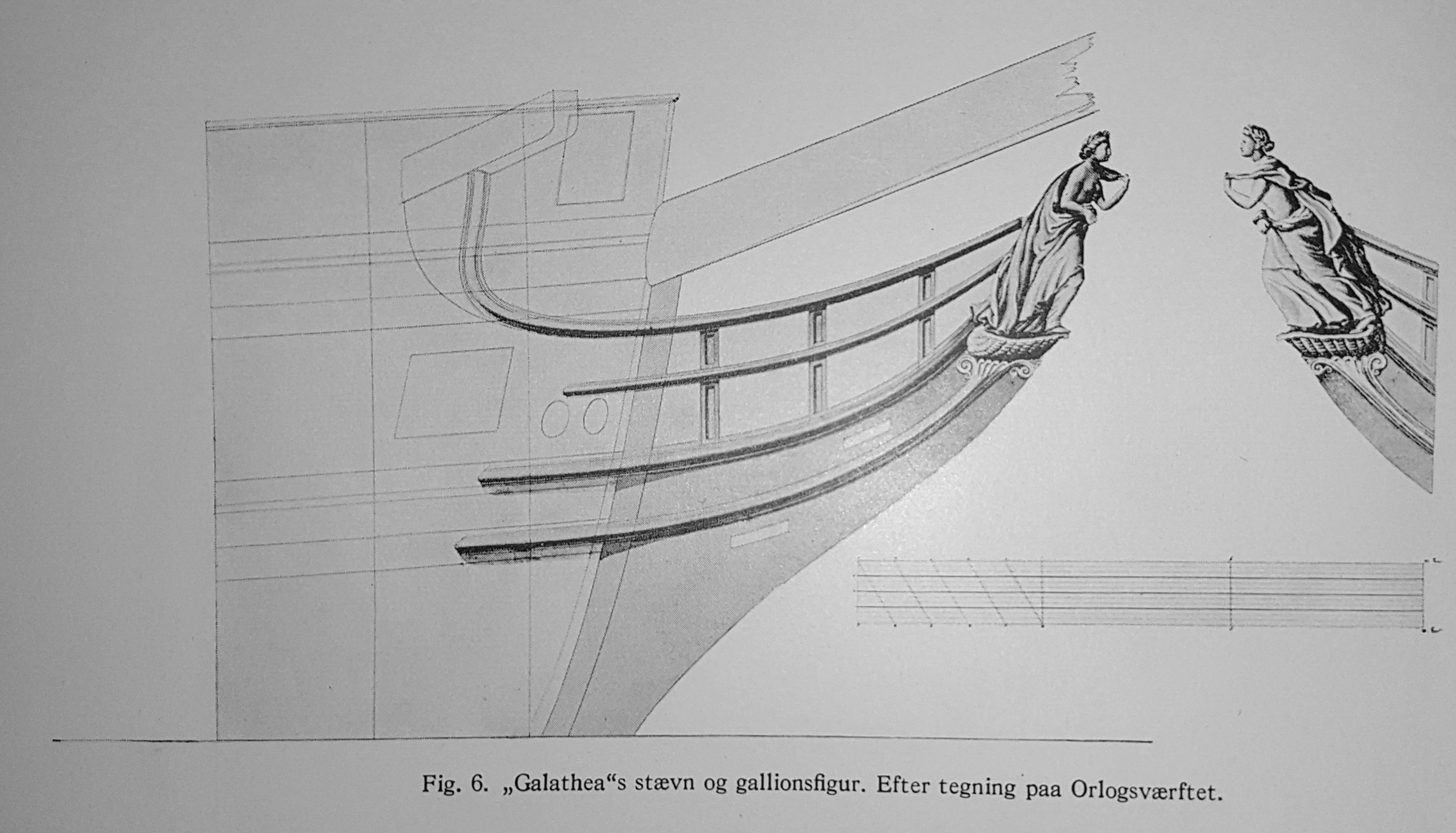
Bow and figurehead of Galathea

Galathea was constructed at Gammelholm to designs by Andreas Schifter. Construction began in 1828 and was completed in 1832. She was launched in 1831.

Galathea was 42.2 metres (138 ft 5 in) long, with a beam of 10.2 metres (33 ft 6 in) and a draft of 4.5 metres (14 ft 9 in). Her armament consisted of 26 × 18-pound guns and 6 × 4-pound guns.

She had a single, closed cannon deck and was equipped with 26 18-pound cannons, two of which were on the forecastle and two on the quarterdeck. It was a full-rigged ship, with royals and skysails on all three masts. However, the ship keeled over too much under all sails and the masts were shortened and sails reduced in 1844. The ship carried one longboat and four smaller boats.

== Career ==
=== The Mediterranean, 1833 and 1839 ===
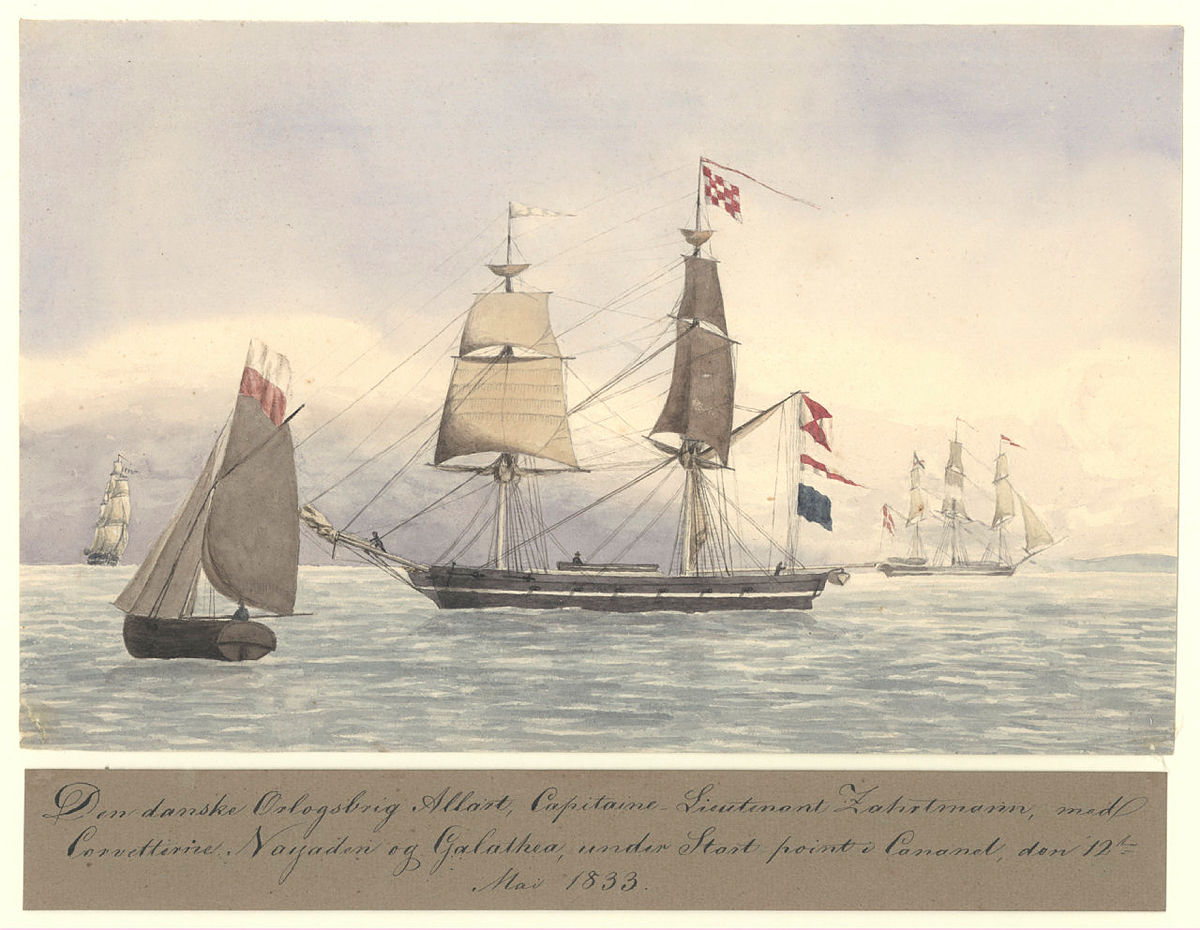
Drawing by Frederik von Scholten from the Channel in 1833: Galathea is seen in the back ground to the right, together with the brig HDMS Allart (centre) and the frigate HDMS Nayaden (background to the left).

In 1833, it was decided to send Galathea to the Mediterranean. On the way home she was tasked with picking up some of Bertel Thorvaldsen's artworks. The artworks were mostly commissions for installation in the Church of Our Lady and Christiansborg Palace, both of which were under reconstruction after fires, but also plaster copies for the Royal Danish Academy of Fine Arts' study collection. The sculptor had recently bequeathed his extensive private collection, both of his own works and those of others, to the City of Copenhagen. Some of these works would therefore also be sent to Copenhagen with the ship. Galathea departed from Copenhagen on 1 May 1833 under command of captain Johan Wilhelm Cornelius Krieger. Other naval officers who participated on the expedition included Hans Peter Rothe and Oluf Vilhelm de Fine Skibsted, Galathea called at Tanger and Tripoli to pay bribes to the local authorities. She then continued to Livorno after calling at Malta and Neaples on the way. Thorvaldsen's daughter Elisa was already in Livorno with her husband Fritz Paulsen and his employer, Princess Charlotte Frederikke. On 6 August 1833, she was therefore able to inform her father about the arrival of the ship:

They have already begun to bring the boxes on board, although the corvette has been in quarantine until yesterday, Tuesday the 6th. They saluted it as it entered the harbor, and I will go and see it one of these days. It has an armament of 52 guns, but carries only 26 so as not to be too heavily loaded. There is a 180-man crew, and the captain has already paid a visit to the princess this morning.

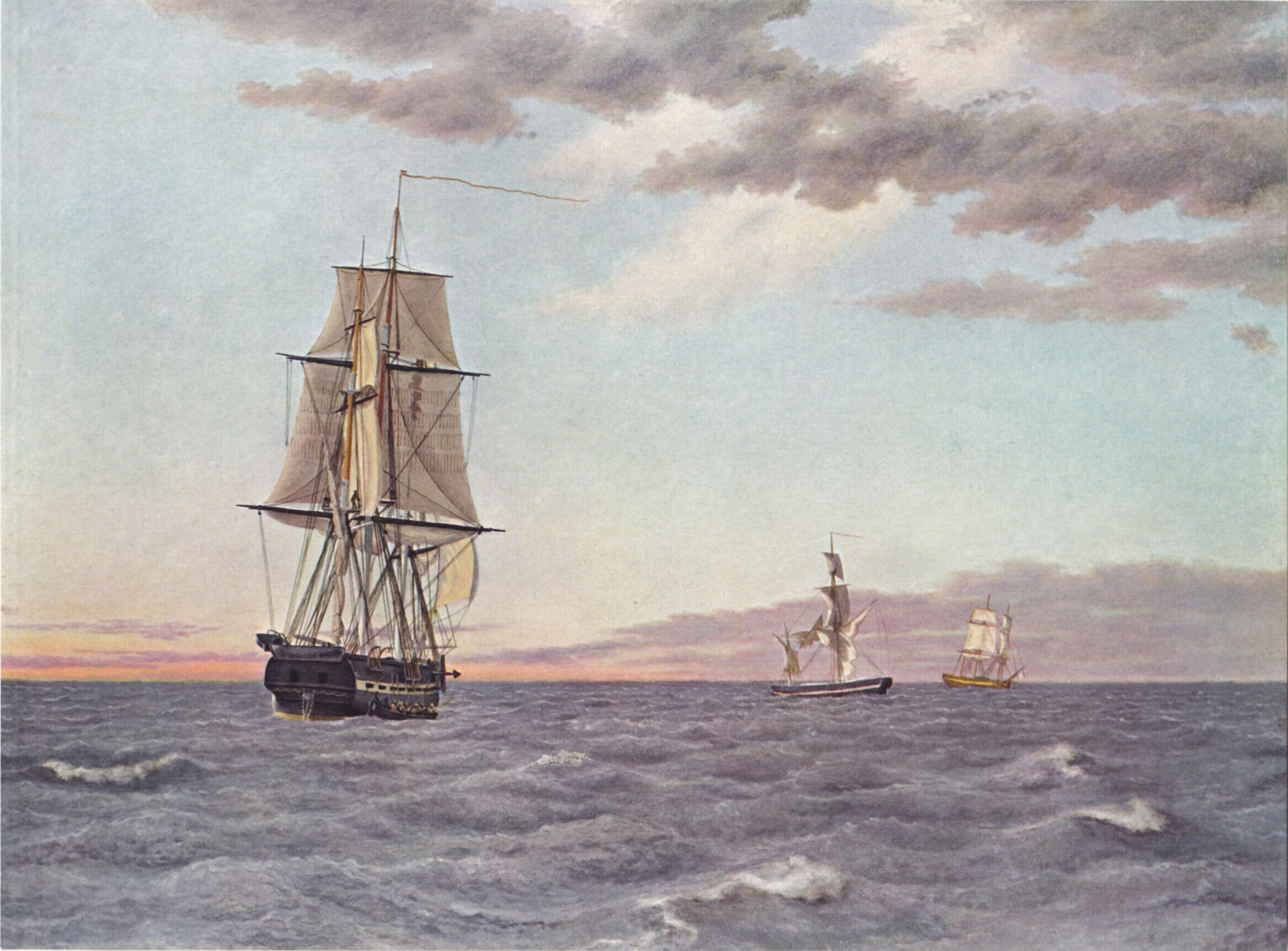
Galathea stopped and sending help to the brig St Jan. Painting by Eckersberg, 1839.

The stowing of the ship began on 7 August. She arrived back in Copenhagen on 20 September 1833. All the 65 boxes with Thorvaldsen's artworks had been marked with either A for the Art Academy ("Akademiet"), K for the Church of Our Lady ("Kirken") or S for Christiansborg ("Slottet"). This made it easy to transfer them to different barges and sail them as close to their final destination as possible: Nyhavn for the academy, Frederiksholms Kanal for the Church of Our Lady and the Arsenal Dock for Christiansborg.

In 1736, Galathea was used as a naval training ship. She was under the command of M. Lütken. She departed from Copenhagen on 3 March and arrived back in Copenhagen on 6 September.

In 1838, Galathea was again sent to Livorno to pick up more of Thorvaldsen's artworks. She was under the command of Jens Seidelin on the voyage. 42 boxes with plaster copies of Thorvaldsen's works as well as antique sculptures were transported to Copenhagen with the ship. Another five boxes with works by other Danish artists as well as a couple of marble blocks for the sculptor Herman W. Bissen were also picked up in Livorno. Thorvaldsen had returned to Copenhagen the previous year, after having worked in Rome since 1797. Galathea arrived back in Copenhagen on 25 August 1849.

=== First Galathea Expedition, 1845–47 ===
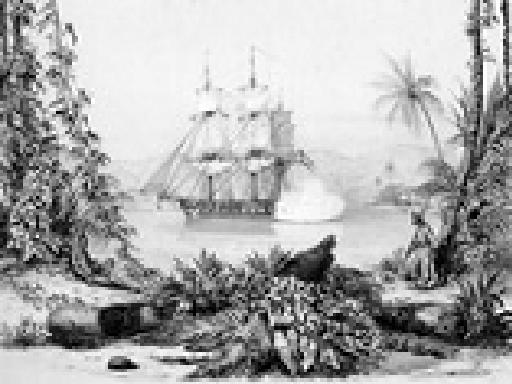
The Galathea at the Nicobar Islands in 1846

After a major overhaul in 1844 Galathea launched on a circumnavigation of the world (known as the first Galathea Expedition) in 1845–1847, under command of Commander Steen Andersen Bille. The expedition left Copenhagen 24 June 1845 and returned 31 August 1847. It served combined scientific and diplomatic purposes and took a route south of Africa to the Indian subcontinent, past Japan and the Sandwich Islands (Hawaii) across the Pacific, south of Cape Horn and across the Atlantic towards Copenhagen.

The scientists on board were Didrik Ferdinand Didrichsen (physician and botanist), Bernhard Casper Kamphǿvener (botanist), Carl Emil Kiellerup (entomologist), Hinrich Johannes Rink (geologist), Wilhelm Friedrich Georg Behn (zoologist) and Johannes Theodor Reinhardt (zoologist). Also two artists, Johan Christian Thornam (drawings) and Poul August Plum (paintings) were on board. The expedition collected large amounts of zoological, botanical and ethnological artifacts, but the immediate scientific results of the expedition were limited. This was primarily due to the death of the Danish King Christian 8th in 1848 and the first Schleswig War, which started later the same year. Christian 8th was personally interested in natural sciences, much more than his son and successor King Frederick 7th. The collected artifacts were distributed among the museums in Copenhagen and Kiel.

The important diplomatic missions included strengthening of trade relationships with the Far East and South America, recolonising the Nicobar Islands and handing over the Danish trade posts in India to England.

The primary first hand account of the expedition is due to the captain in the book St. Billes Beretning om Corvetten Gaiatheas Rejse omkring Jorden from 1853.

=== First Schleswig War ===
In 1848-49 Galathea participated in the first Schleswig War, where she patrolled the western Baltic and served in the blockade of the German harbours. In April 1849 Galathea was guarding the entrance to Eckernförde, but did not participate in the Battle of Eckernförde (5 April), as she was ordered to leave for Kiel on the very morning of the battle. In the following days Galathea participated in the transfer of troops to the fighting at Bov and to Eckernförde, together with HDMS Gejser, HDMS Hekla and HDMS Najaden. Later the same year Galathea together with the brig HDMS St. Crois blocked the German port in Pillau, where they took part in the fighting with the Prussian steamer SMS Preussischer Adler, which was forced to withdraw to Danzig.

=== Later career ===
After the war Galathea served briefly as guard vessel in the Sound. She was decommissioned by the Rotal Danish Navy on 4 July 1861.

== Fate ==
Galathea was sold to the private company Mohr & Kjær, Copenhagen, in 1862 and rigged as a bark. Until 1870 she sailed emigrants from Bergen and Trondheim to Canada and was sold to Arendal in Norway in 1875. Galathea was lost at Oran, Algeria, on 11 May 1889.

== Known Commanders ==
- 1833 Commander Johan Cornelius Krieger
- 1837 Commander M. Lütken
- 1839 Commander Jens Seidelin
- 1845-1847 Commander Steen A. Bille
- 1848-1849 Commander C. L. Prøsilius
- 1852 Lieutenant Commander P. C. Holm
- 1854 Commander C. N. Wulff
