= Galathea expeditions =

Series of three Danish ship-based scientific research expeditions

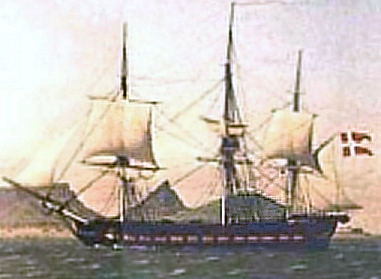
The corvette HDMS Galathea (1833–1861)

The Galathea expeditions comprise a series of three Danish ship-based scientific research expeditions in the 19th, 20th and 21st centuries, carried out with material assistance from the Royal Danish Navy and, with regard to the second and third expeditions, under the auspices of the Danish Expedition Foundation. All three expeditions circumnavigated the world from west to east and followed similar routes.

== First expedition ==
=== Preparations ===
The first Galathea Expedition took place from 1845 to 1847 and had political and scientific objectives. It was initiated by the King of Denmark, Christian VIII, with its main purposes the handover of the Danish colonies in India, following their sale to the British East India Company, as well as a final Danish attempt to explore and recolonise the Nicobar Islands in the Indian Ocean. Additional aims were the expansion of trade with China and the discovery of new trading opportunities, as well as making extensive scientific collections.

HDMS Galathea was a three-masted sailing ship, a naval corvette which had been built in 1831 at the Gammelholm naval shipyard in Copenhagen. It was 43 m (141 ft) in length and had a draught of 5 m (16 ft). When it departed on its voyage under the leadership of Captain Steen Andersen Bille it carried 231 seamen and scientists, 36 guns, and supplies for one year.

The scientists included physician and assistant botanist Didrik Ferdinand Didrichsen, botanist Bernhard Casper Kamphøvener, entomologist Carl Emil Kiellerup, geologist Hinrich Johannes Rink and zoologists Wilhelm Friedrich Georg Behn and Johannes Theodor Reinhardt, not all of whom remained for the duration of the voyage, as well as sketch artist Johan Christian Thornam and genre painter Poul August Plum.

It was an expensive undertaking, with a budget of nearly half a million Rixdollars, equivalent to 3% of Denmark's annual state revenues at the time.

=== The voyage ===
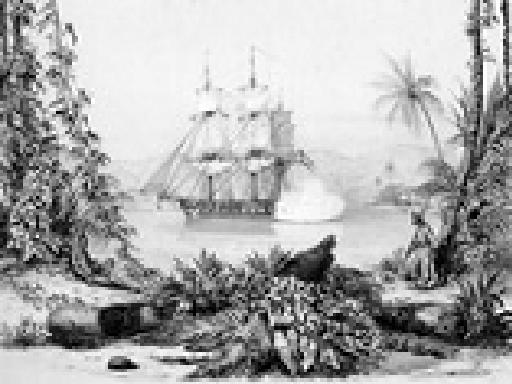
HDMS Galathea at the Nicobar Islands in 1846

Galathea left Copenhagen on 24 June 1845 and, after a provisioning stop at Madeira, sailed southwards around Africa to India, where she visited Tranquebar, Pondicherry, Madras and Calcutta. In Calcutta an additional ship, the steamboat Ganges, was purchased and the carrier Christine hired, to assist with work in the Nicobar Islands. Considerable time and effort was expended at the Nicobars; most of January 1846 was spent in the northern Nicobar islands, and February in the southern. As well as scientific surveys and collecting, preparations were made for a new colony based at Pulo Milu. Several people, including the geologist Rink, remained there when the expedition departed, though the nascent colony was abandoned only two years later.

The Galathea proceeded to Southeast Asia, calling at Penang, Singapore, Batavia, and Manila before heading for the Chinese coast and visiting Hong Kong, Macau, Canton, Amoy, and Shanghai. An attempt to stop at Japan was rebuffed by the authorities there. The ship then crossed the Pacific Ocean, visiting the Hawaiian archipelago and Tahiti on the way, to Valparaíso, Callao, and Lima in South America, before rounding Cape Horn. Further visits were made to Buenos Aires, Montevideo, Rio de Janeiro, and Bahia, following which Galathea headed back to Denmark, anchoring in Copenhagen harbour on 24 August 1847 after a voyage of more than two years. During the course of the voyage 20 Danish sailors had died and several others were discharged.

=== Results ===
The expedition returned with 93 containers of "zoological, entomological, botanical and geological Objects". There were also 21 boxes of ethnographic material, a large collection from Java, as well as gifts from scientists in many of the cities and ports visited by the expedition. The intention of Christian VIII was to sponsor the publication of the scientific results of the expedition. However, the King died in January 1848 and the country was thrown into the Three Years' War. Most of the boxes of collected items lay unopened for many years and, with some exceptions, were never properly processed, nor the full results formally published. The collections subsequently served mainly as reference material.

== Second expedition ==
The second expedition, Galathea Deep Sea Expedition was conceived in 1941 in discussions between journalist and author Hakon Mielche and oceanographer and ichthyologist Anton Frederik Bruun. It was originally hoped to send out a second expedition on the centenary of the first; however, World War II intervened and preparations had to be postponed. In June 1945 the two protagonists, along with explorers Eigil Knuth, Ebbe Munch and Henning Haslund-Christensen, decided to establish the Danish Expedition Foundation, which was to raise funds for the second Galathea, as well as other, expeditions.

The expedition eventually started in 1950, with its main purpose deep sea oceanography. For the use of the expedition a British sloop, HMS Leith, was acquired and renamed HDMS Galathea. It was 80 m (260 ft) long and 11 m (36 ft) wide, with a draught of 3.5 m (11 ft) and was powered by two steam turbines that gave it a cruising speed of 12 knots (22 km/h; 14 mph). Galathea 2 left Copenhagen in October 1950 carrying a crew of about 100 seamen and scientists, visiting many of the same places the original Galathea had visited over a century earlier. The main difference in the route taken from the earlier expedition was in using the Panama Canal, rather than the Drake Passage at the southern end of South America, to transit between the Pacific Ocean and the Atlantic. From 1950 to 1952 the expedition carried out a program of scientific exploration; the highlight occurred in July 1951 when, while investigating the Philippine Trench, scientists secured biological material from a record depth of 10,190 m (33,430 ft). The expedition returned to Copenhagen in June 1952 where the ship was welcomed by a crowd of 20,000 people.

=== Results ===
The second Galathea expedition led to the discovery of, among other things, the fish species Antipodocottus galatheae and Abyssobrotula galatheae, the snail species Guttula galatheae and, above all, living Monoplacophora, a class of "ancestral mollusc" which until then was known only from the fossil record. The biggest sensation at the time, however, was the discovery of sea anemones on a rock from the bottom of the Philippine Trench since it had been assumed that life could not exist at this sea depth. Dr Claude E. ZoBell, the 'Father of Marine Microbiology', was aboard this expedition.

== Third expedition ==
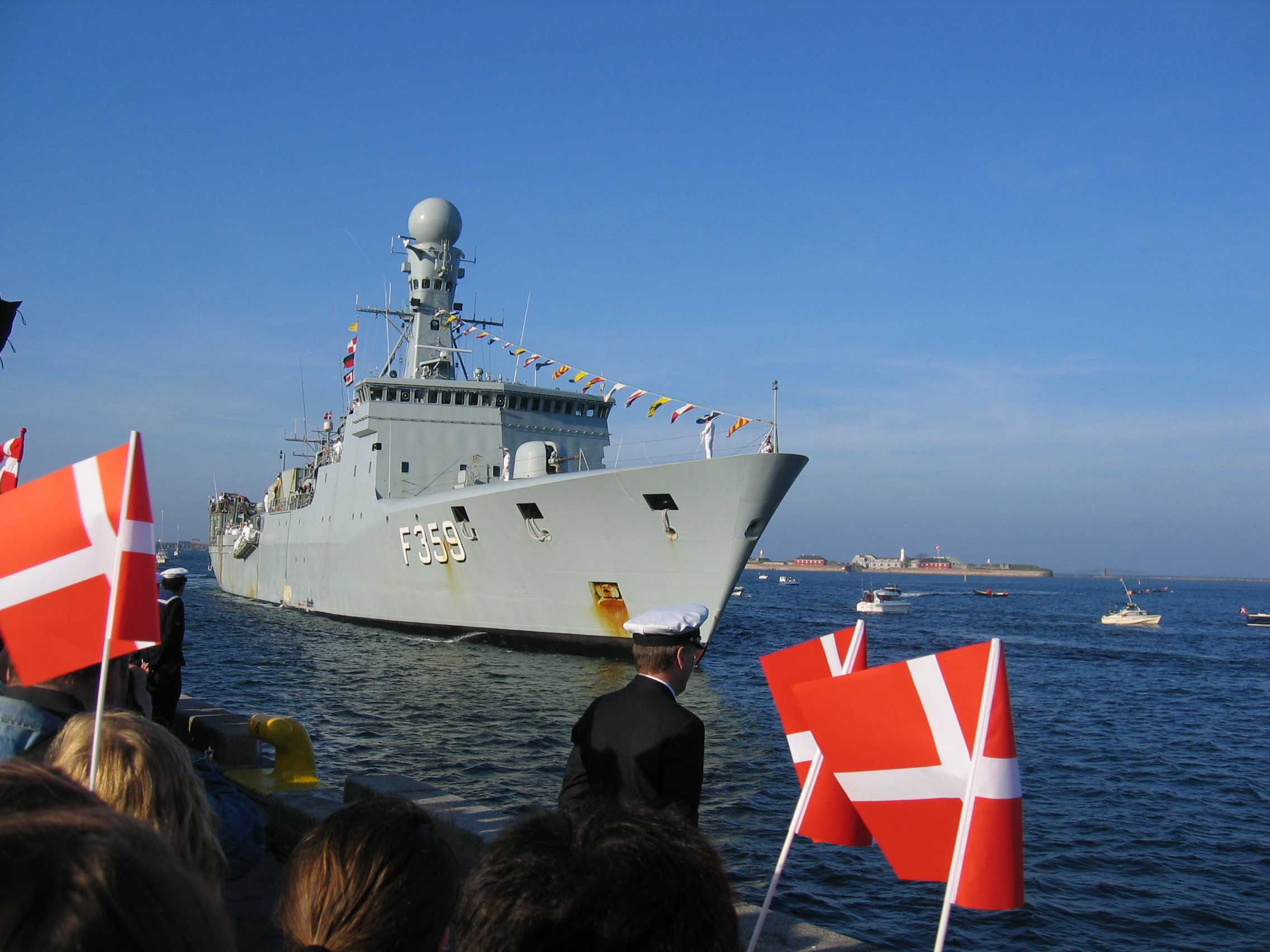
Vædderen being welcomed home to Copenhagen on 25 April 2007 at the end of her voyage

The third expedition took place during 2006–2007, using the offshore patrol frigate HDMS Vædderen, which was refitted to serve as an expedition ship. It is a Thetis-class frigate which was built at the Svendborg Shipyards in 1990 and is 112.5 m (369 ft) long and 14.5 m (48 ft) wide. Although the voyage was publicised as the third Galathea expedition, the ship itself was not renamed.

The expedition's main purpose was to carry out research on climate and weather changes, earthquakes, tsunamis, and marine biology. It left Copenhagen in August 2006 and visited the Faroe Islands and Greenland, then travelled southwards through the Atlantic Ocean along the west coast of Africa to Cape Town. It then crossed the Indian Ocean to Australia, the Solomon Islands, New Zealand, and Antarctica, before sailing northwards along the west coast of South America to the Panama Canal, then sailing through the Caribbean and visiting New York, before returning to Denmark in April 2007.

== See also ==
- Galathea Deep
- Weber Deep
