= Bredgade 45 =

Building in Copenhagen, Denmark

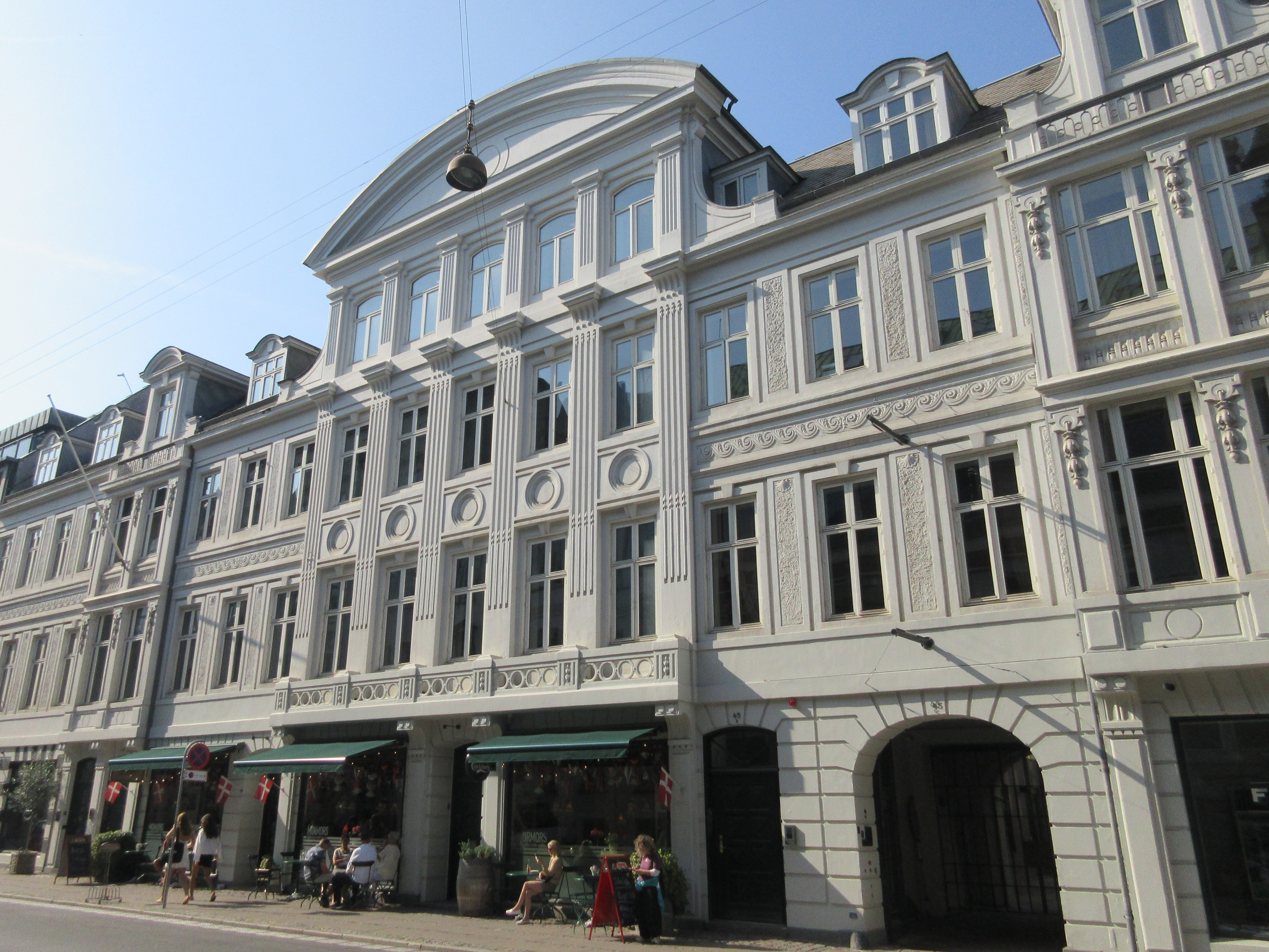
- Interactive map of the Bredgade 45 area

General information
- Location: Copenhagen, Denmark
- Coordinates: 55°41′02.4″N 12°35′23.4″E
- Completed: 18th century
- Renovated: 1880

Design and construction
- Architect: Vilhelm Dahlerup

Bredgade 45 is a former town mansion situated around the corner from Frederik's Church in the Frederiksstaden district of central Copenhagen, Denmark. Originally constructed as an extension to the adjacent Moltke Mansion, it owes its current Historicist design to a renovation undertaken by Vilhelm Dahlerup. Notable residents include Governor-General of the Danish West Indies Peter von Scholten, naval officer Steen Andersen Bille, landowner Peder Brønnum Scavenius and businessman and art collector Heinrich Hirschsprung. The property is now owned by Jeudan. Female Founders House, a hub for female entrepreneurs, is based in the side wing (Bredgade 45B).

== History ==
=== Construction ===
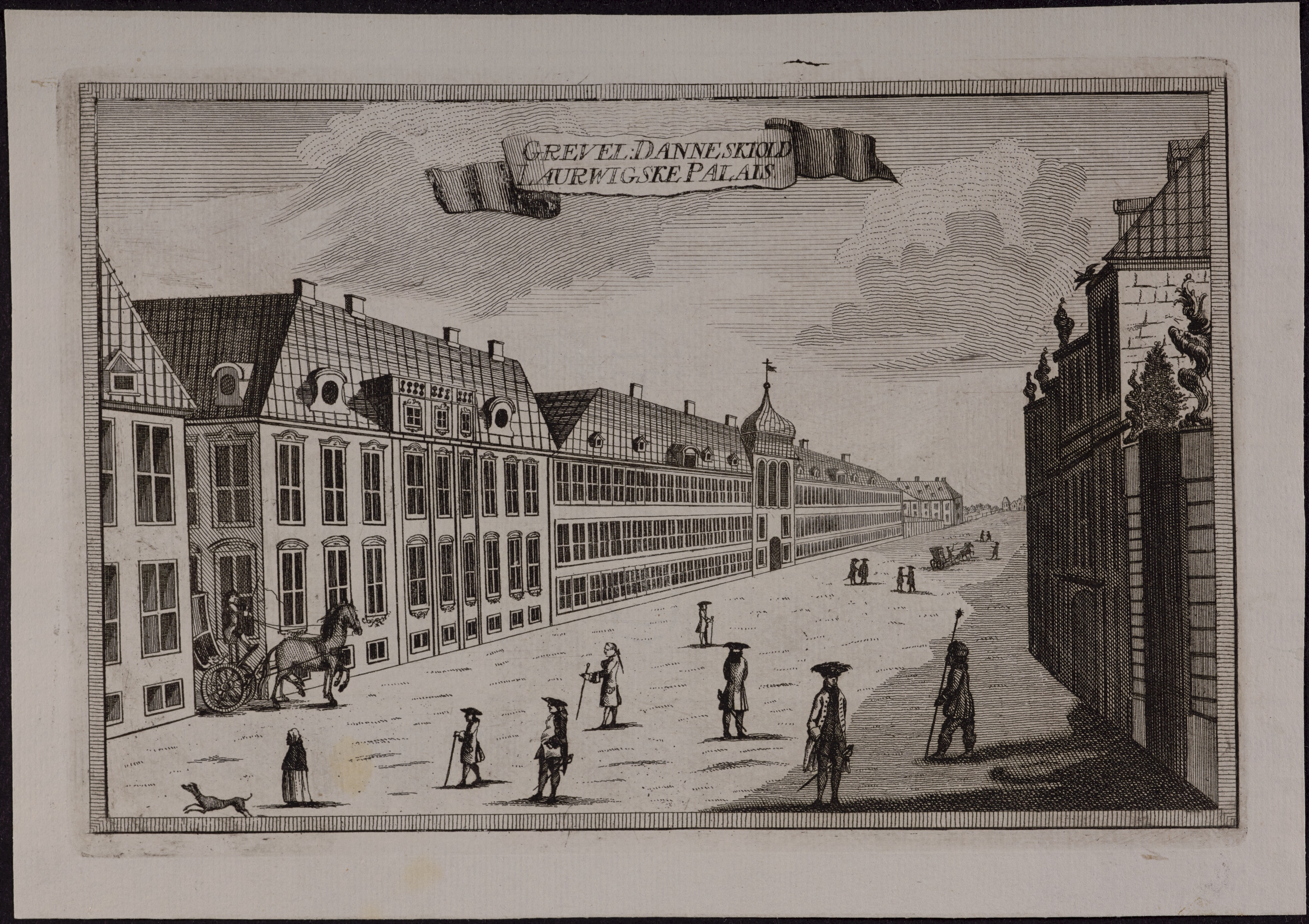
The north wing of Count Danneskiold-Laurvig's mansion in c. 1750

In 1729–1730, Ferdinand Danneskiold-Laurvig expanded the Danneskiold-Laurvig Mansion with a new north wing. The building was most likely constructed by Phillip de Langes. The property was listed in the new cadastre of 1756 as No. 209 in St. Ann's East Quarter.

On 17 November 1788, Frédéric de Coninck and Niels Lunde Reiersen purchased the mansion. Coninck became the sole owner of the property in 1789. In the 1800s, he undertook a comprehensive transformation of the north wing. He initially charged Andreas Kurjerup with creating a plan for a hotel (herbergergård) on the site bit these plans were not realized. Coninck kept the north wing when he sold the corner building to dowager queen Juliane Marie (1729–1796) in 1794. The property was subsequently referred to as No. 209 C. The long building was divided into three sections. The section closest to the Frederick's Church site was used as his own home and office. The central section contained the home of his brother Jean de Coninck. The section adjacent to the old mansion was used as residential quarters for staff.

Coninck's property was listed in the new cadastre of 1806 as No. 186 in St. Ann's East Quarter. The poet and translator C. F. E. Wilster (1797–1840) was a resident in the building in 1911.

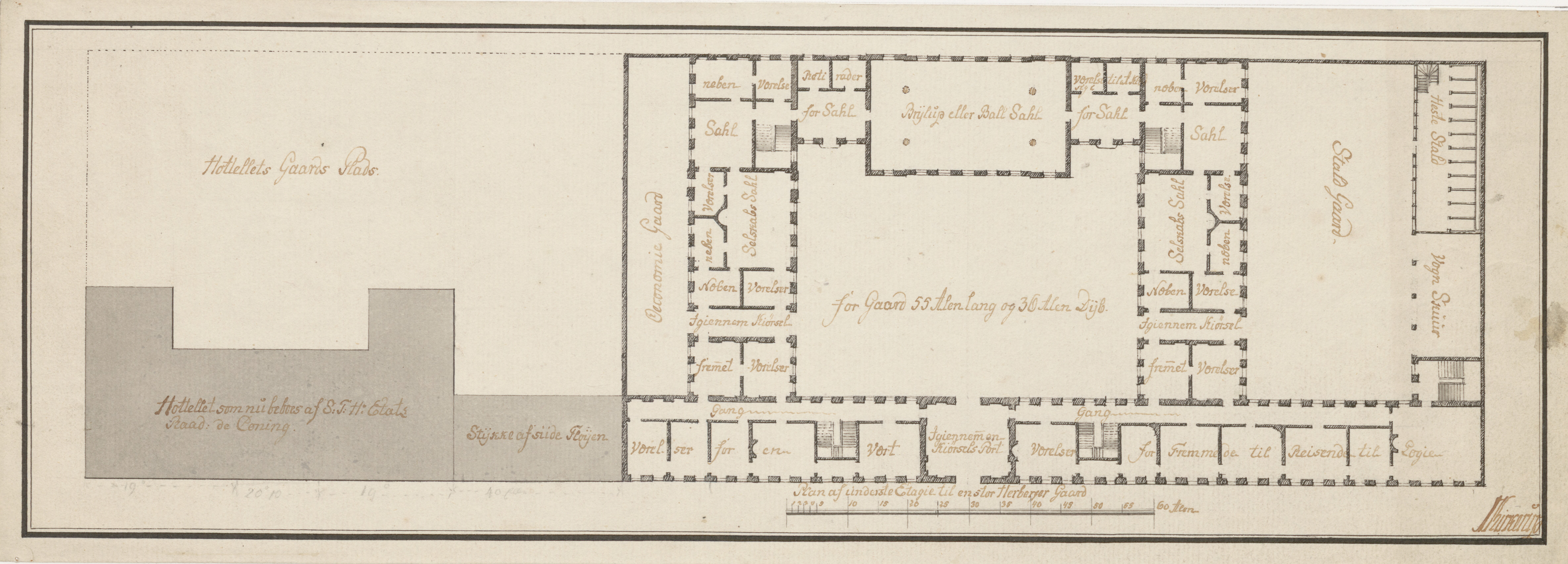
Andreas Kirkerup's unrealized hotel proposal.

=== Louis de Coninck and Jean Monard ===
In 1812, No. 196 was acquired for 37,000 rigsdaler by Coninck's son Louis Charles Frederik de Coninck. In 1810, Jean de Coninck had acqiored the adjacent building Bredgade 43 for 18,000 rigsdaler. In 1820, Louis de Coninck sold half of the property to his brother-in-law Jean Monard. Monard had previously served as pastor at the Teformed Church in Copenhagen. He and his wife had later moved to Paris. In 1822, Monard also bought the other half of the property.

=== Peter von Scholten, 1831–1848 ===
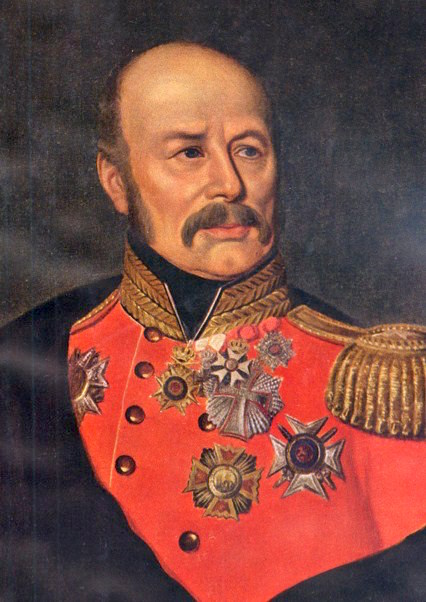
Peter von Scholten.

In December 1830, Peter von Scholten (1784–1854) purchased the property for 24,500 rigsdaler. His property was home to three households at the 1840 census. Scholten resided in the front wing with his wife Elizabeth von Scholten, their three daughters, five male servants and six maids.

The naval officer Steen Andersen Bille was a tenant in the building from 1833 to 1842. He resided in the northern side wing at the 1840 census. He lived there with his wife Steen Caroline Wilhelmine Bille, their three children (aged five to ten), one male servant and two maids.

The merchant Isaac S. Benners (c. 1763–1841) resided in the southern side wing at the 1840 census. He lived there with his son I. P. Benners, his daughters Marry Benners and Elisabeth Marie Carl, his son-in-law John Mai Carl, his grand children Charlotte Mai Carl and Alexander Mai Carl and two maids. Another daughter, Malvina, was married to the naval officer and plantation owner John Christmas.

Peter von Scholten was in the Danish West Indies at the 1845 census. Elisabeth von Scholten resided in the building with their daughter Elise von Scholten and granddaughter Elisabeth Adelgunde von Bülow, four male servants and five maids. Ernst Poul Bruhn, a colonel-lieutenant and adjudant for the king, resided in one of the other apartments with his wife Anna Elsabeth Wulff, their four children (aged 11 to 23), one male servant and one maid. The elder of the two sons were the sculptor Ernst Bruhn. Henriette Wilhelmine Tillisch /née Lerche, 1801-1887(, widow of chamberlain Christian Ludvig Tillisch (1797–1844), resided in the building with her five children (aged four to 14), two male servants and five maids. Christian William Christensen, a royal lackey, resided in the building with his wife Anne Johanne Christensen.

In 1849, Scholten sold the property.

=== 1850–1880 ===
In June 1848, J. H. Lytthans and Fr. Hoskiær purchased the property for 39,000 rigsdaler.

Peder Brønnum Scavenius (1795–1868) resided on the ground floor of the building at the 1850 census. The politician Heinrich Anna Reventlow-Criminil (1798–1869) resided in the building from 1850 to 1852. He served as Minister of Foreign Affairs from 1842 to 1848 and Minister for Holstein from 1852 to 1854. The businessman Alfred Hage (1803–1872) resided in the building around 1861. His previous home was at Ny Kongensgade 6. After around a year he moved to the Harsdorff House on Kongens Nytorv.

In January 1853, Sophie Hedevig Zeuthen and Frederik Otto Zytphen-Adeler, Baron of Adelersborg bought the property.

In April 1868, Christian Frederik Schulin Zeuthen acquired S. H. Zeuthen's half of the property for 30,000 rigsdaler. In August 1873, G. F. 0. Zytphen-Adeler bought Mary Schulin Zeuthen's half of the property for 35,000 rigsdaler.

In November 1878, Frederik Herman Christian de Falsen-Zytphen-Adeler bought the property for DKK 172,896.

=== Dahlerup's renovation ===
In December 1880, Bredgade 45 was acquired by master saddler and later politician C. T. Rothmann for DKK 179,000. The building was subsequently adapted by Vilhelm Dahlerup. The renovation was most likely instigated by C. F. Tietgen's completion of Drederick's Church. The adjacent building at Vredgade 47 was completed in 1882.

The tobacco manufacturer Heinrich Hirschsprung lived on the first floor from 1882. His previous home was at Højbro Plads 21. Om 1893, he moved to an apartment at Vredgade 43.

=== 20th century ===
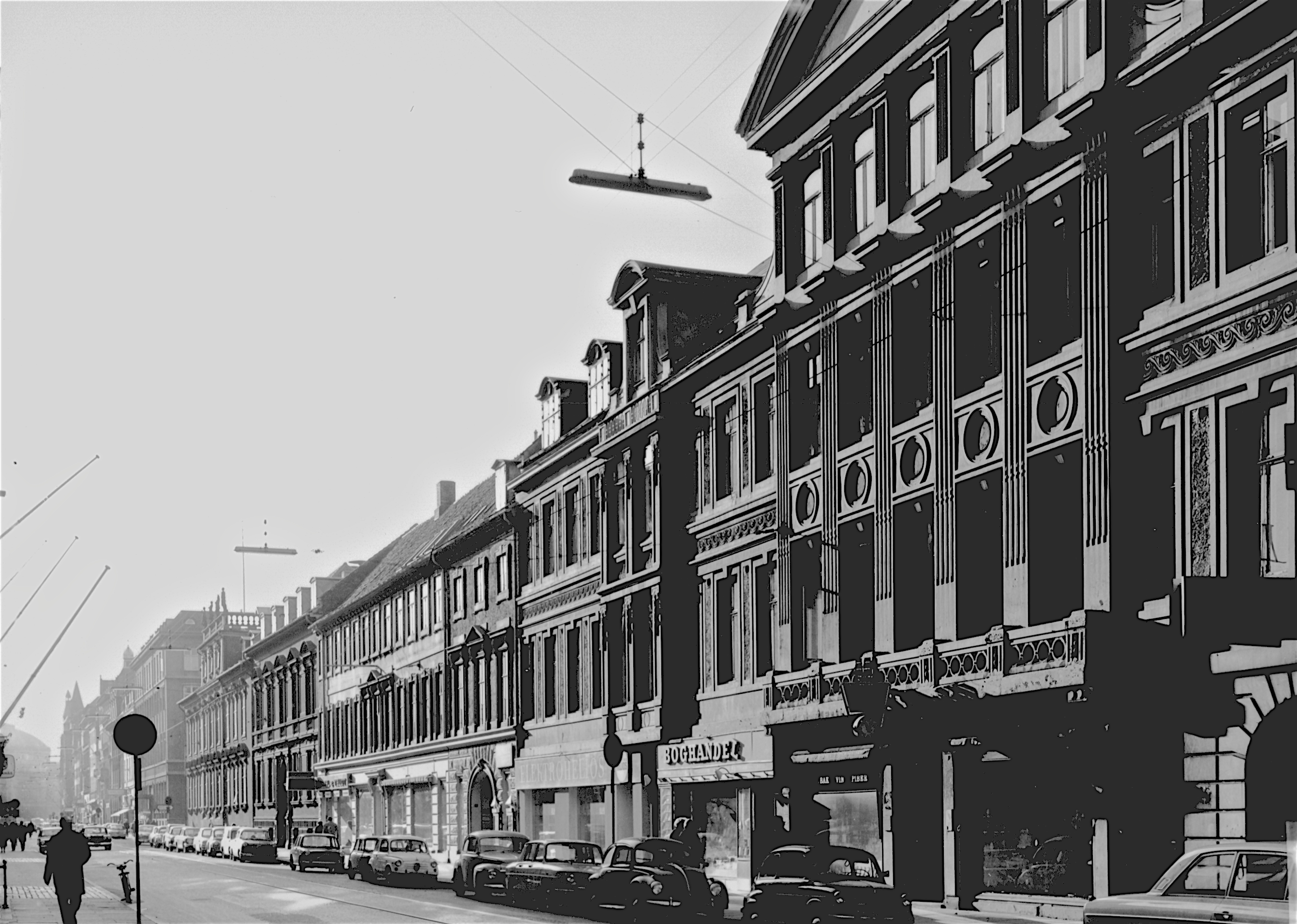
The building in 1965.

Rothman's Patent-Persiennefabrik was based in the building in 1888. In November 1911, Rothmann 's property passed to his widow Thora Adelhaide Rothman Om December 1916, she sold it to Elektricitets Aktieselskabet Asea. In 1968, Vredgade 45 was acquired by the insurance company Baltica (from 1973/1974: Baltica-Skandinavia).

In 2016, Tryg sold Bredgade 45 and Bredgade 40–42 for DKK 65 million to Jeudan.

== Architecture ==
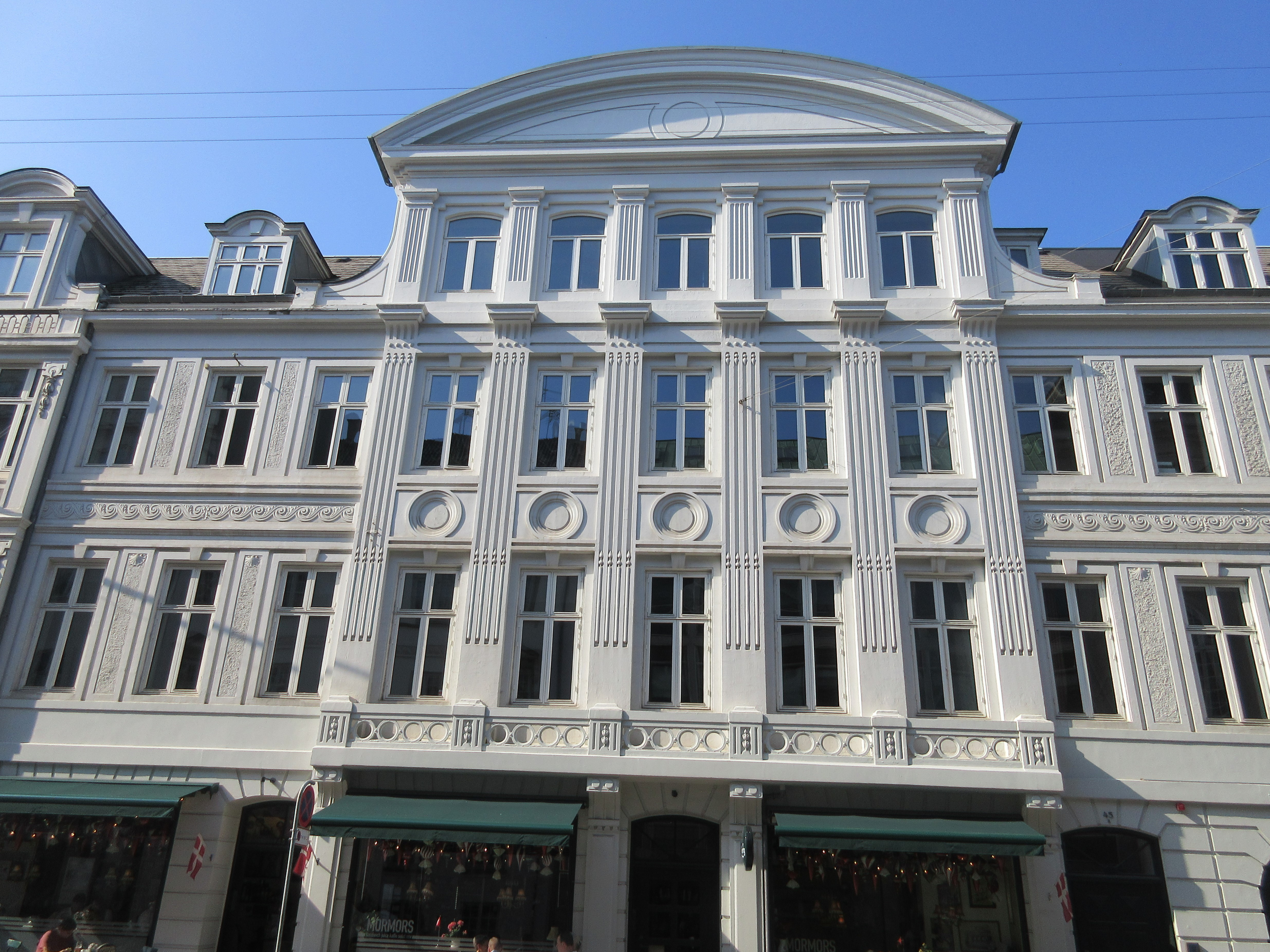
Detail of the facade.

Bredgade 45 is constructed with three storeys over a walk-out basement and 21 bays long. The five central bays are topped by a five-bay dormer. The facade is richly decorated with fluted pilasters and relief ornamentation.

== Today ==
Bredgade 45 is let out as office space. In 2022, Jeudan and Nordic Female Founders opened Female Founders House at Bredgade 45V.
