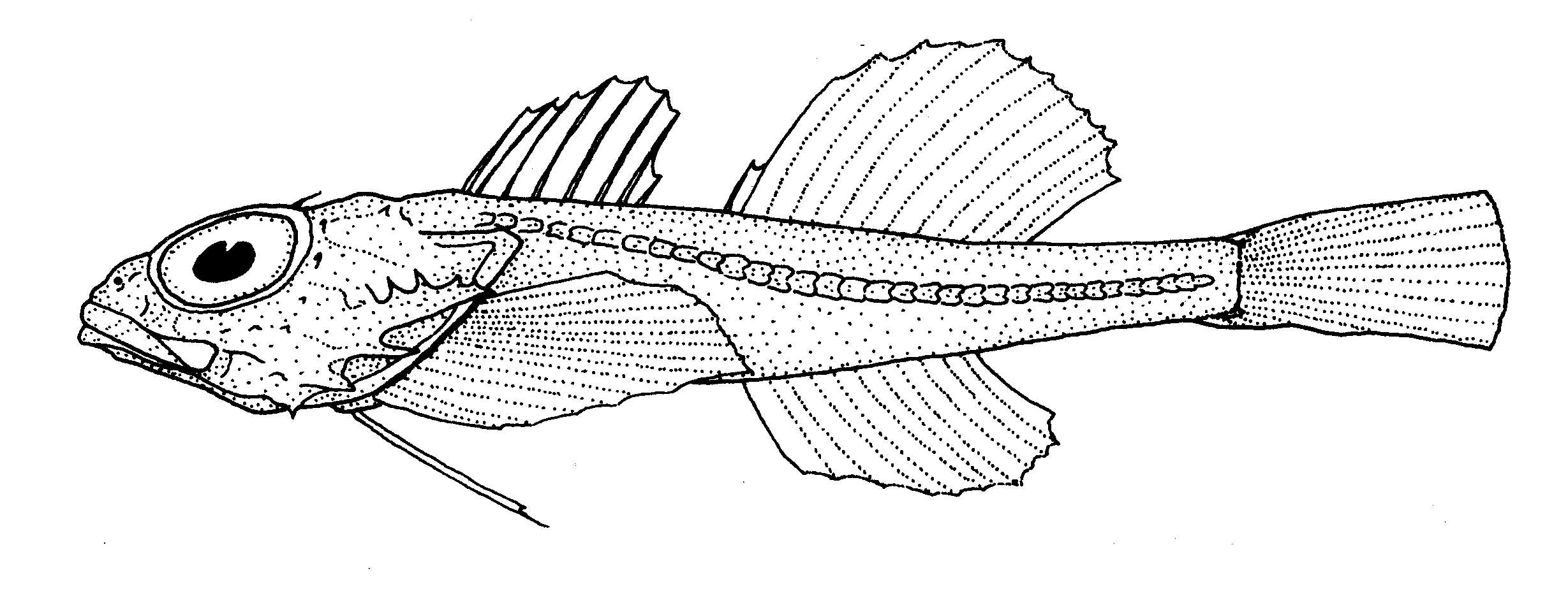
- A. megalops Drawing by Dr Tony Ayling

Scientific classification
- Kingdom: Animalia
- Phylum: Chordata
- Class: Actinopterygii
- Division: Teleostei
- Order: Perciformes
- Suborder: Cottoidei
- Superfamily: Cottoidea
- Family: Psychrolutidae
- Genus: Antipodocottus; Bolin, 1952

Type species
- Antipodocottus galatheae Bolin, 1952

Species
- See text.

= Antipodocottus =

Genus of fishes

Antipodocottus is a genus of marine ray-finned fishes belonging to the family Cottidae, the typical sculpins. These fishes are found in the western Pacific Ocean. This is the only genus of Cottids represented in the Southern Hemisphere, although their classification in the Cottidae is not universally accepted.

== Taxonomy ==
Antipodocottus was first proposed as a monospecific genus in 1952 by the American ichthyologist Rolf Ling Bolin when he described Antipodocottus galathea from the Tasman Sea off New Zealand. The 5th edition of Fishes of the World classifies the genus Antipodocottus within the subfamily Cottinae of the family Cottidae, however, other authors classify the genus within the subfamily Psychrolutinae of the family Psychrolutidae.

== Species ==
There are currently four recognized species in this genus:

- Antipodocottus elegans R. Fricke & Brunken (de), 1984 (Dwarf sculpin)
- Antipodocottus galatheae Bolin, 1952 (Galathea sculpin)
- Antipodocottus megalops H. H. DeWitt, 1969
- Antipodocottus mesembrinus (R. Fricke & Brunken, 1983)
- Antipodocottus novaecaledonicus R. Fricke 2026
