= Antipodocottus elegans =

Scientific classification
- Kingdom: Animalia
- Phylum: Chordata
- Class: Actinopterygii
- Order: Perciformes
- Suborder: Cottoidei
- Family: Psychrolutidae
- Genus: Antipodocottus
- Species: A. elegans

Binomial name
- Antipodocottus elegans Fricke & Brunken, 1984
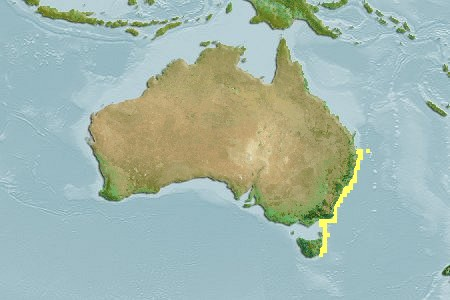
- Range of A. elegans

Species of fish

Antipodocottus elegans, the dwarf sculpin, is a species of marine ray-finned fish belonging to the family Cottidae, the typical sculpins. Most commonly found in the benthic zone around depths of 400 meters, A. elegans is found almost exclusively near Wollongong in New South Wales, Australia.
