= Estate Carolina Sugar Plantation =

- U.S. National Register of Historic Places
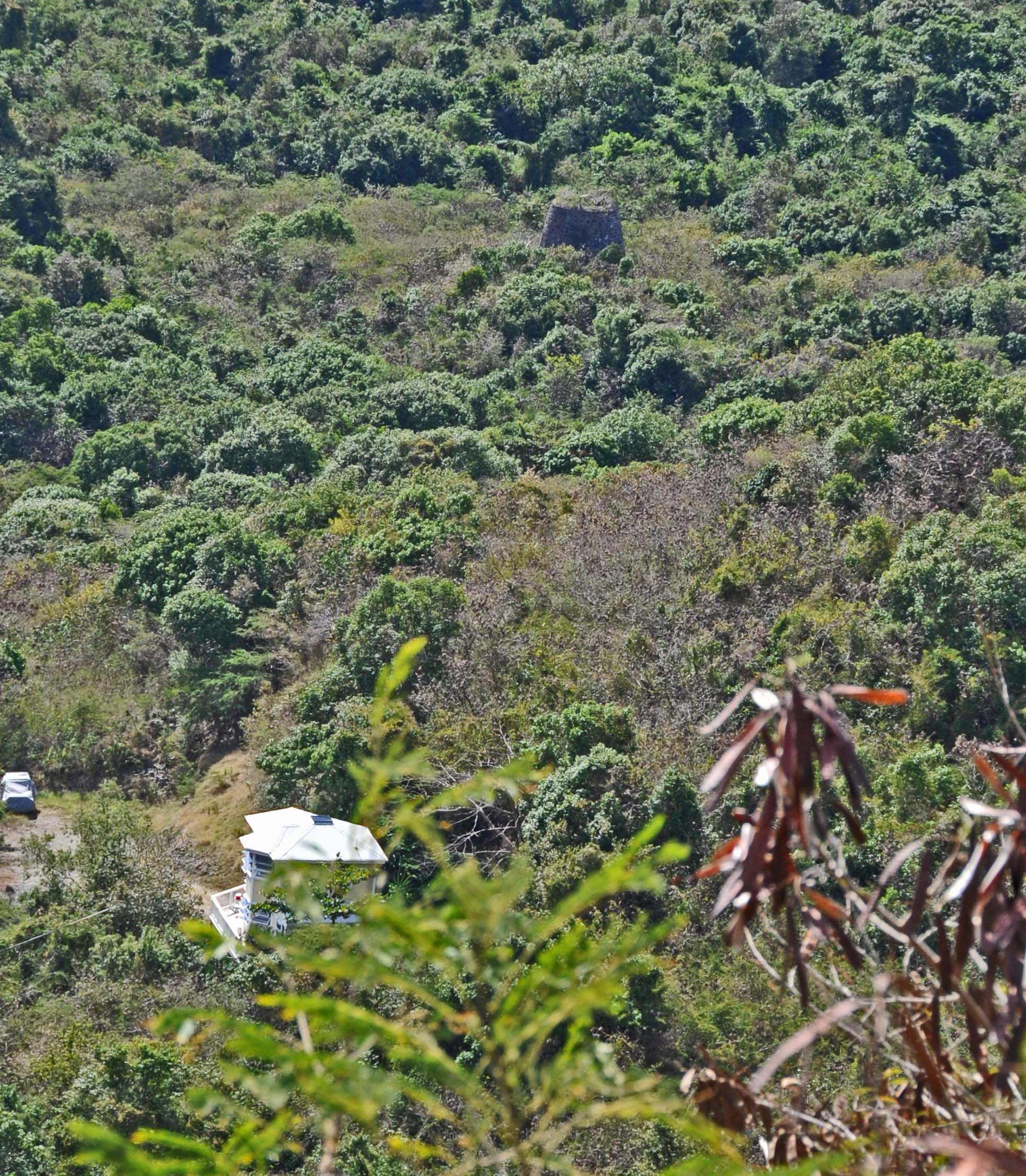

- Location within the U.S. Virgin Islands
- Location: West of Coral Bay on King Hill Road, Saint John, U.S. Virgin Islands
- Coordinates: 18.349444°N 64.718611°W
- Area: 117 acres (0.47 km^{2})
- Built: 1717, 1725, 1733
- Architectural style: Colonial Danish West Indies
- NRHP reference No.: 76002217
- Added to NRHP: July 19, 1976

The Estate Carolina Sugar Plantation near Coral Bay on Saint John, U.S. Virgin Islands is a historic sugar plantation and later rum distillery.

The sugar plantation for sugar cane growing and processing was in operation during the colonial Danish West Indies period.

It was listed on the U.S. National Register of Historic Places in 1976. The listing included eight contributing sites on a 183 acres (0.74 km^{2}) property.

== History ==
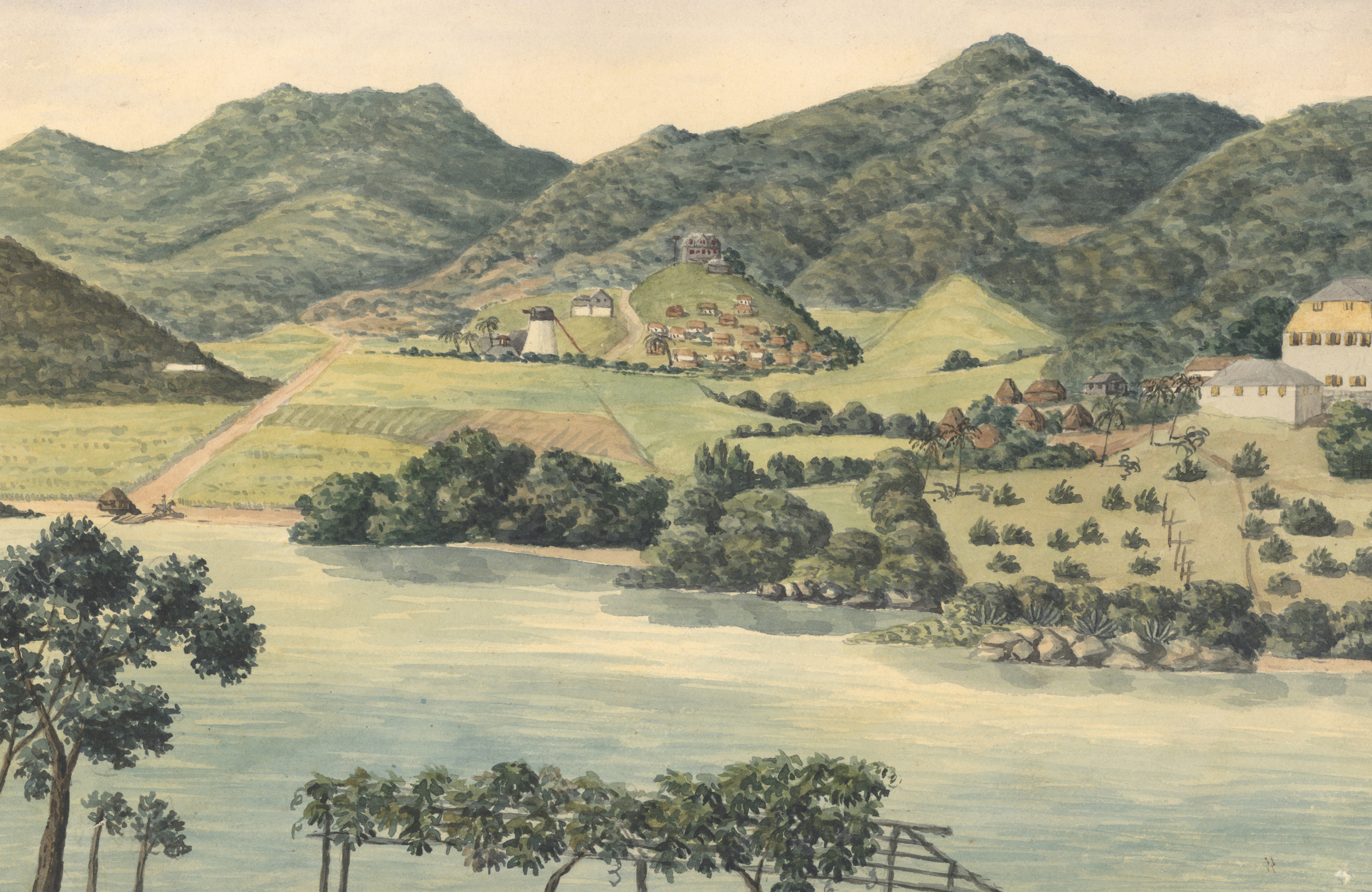
Frederik von Scholten: Plantation Carolina near Coral Bay, 1833

The estate was in the 1730s owned by magistrate Johannes Sødtmann. Jis estate was the starting point of the successful 1733 slave insurrection on St. John which began on 23 November and carried almost the entire island of St. John.

== Today ==
The plantation's ruins include:

- sugar factory — built c.1725.
- animal mill — built c.1725.
- stone windmill tower — built in 1733.
- original distillery for bay rum production — built in c.1900
- a later distillery with "1925" upon it
- other Estate Carolina buildings from c.1900, 1920, and 1945.

== See also ==
- Sugar plantations in the Danish West Indies
