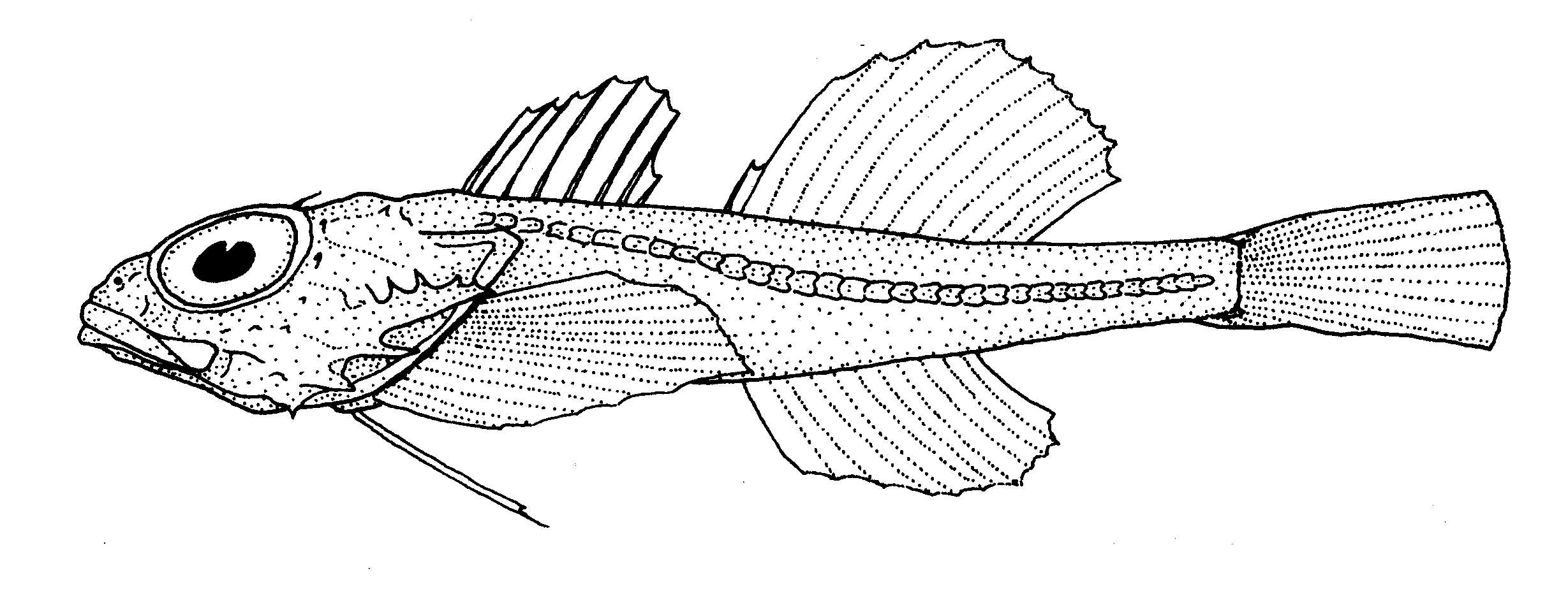

Scientific classification
- Kingdom: Animalia
- Phylum: Chordata
- Class: Actinopterygii
- Order: Perciformes
- Suborder: Cottoidei
- Family: Psychrolutidae
- Genus: Antipodocottus
- Species: A. megalops

Binomial name
- Antipodocottus megalops H. H. DeWitt, 1969

= Antipodocottus megalops =

Species of fish

Antipodocottus megalops is a species of marine ray-finned fish belonging to the family Cottidae, the typical sculpins. It is found on the continental shelf around New Zealand, at depths of between 400 and 600 m (1,300 and 2,000 ft). Its length is up to 5 cm (2.0 in).
