= Estate Butler's Bay =

- U.S. National Register of Historic Places
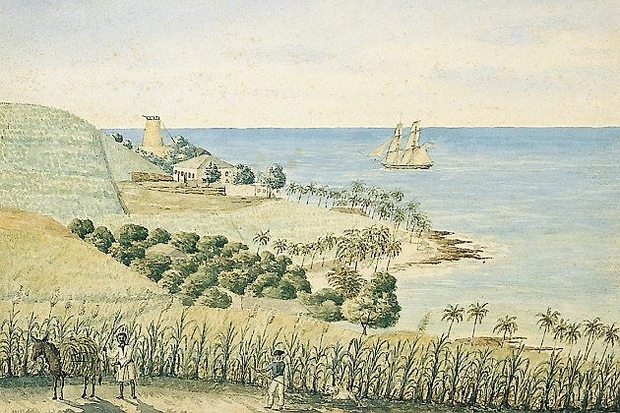
- Watercolour of Butler's Bay by Frederik von Scholten, 1830

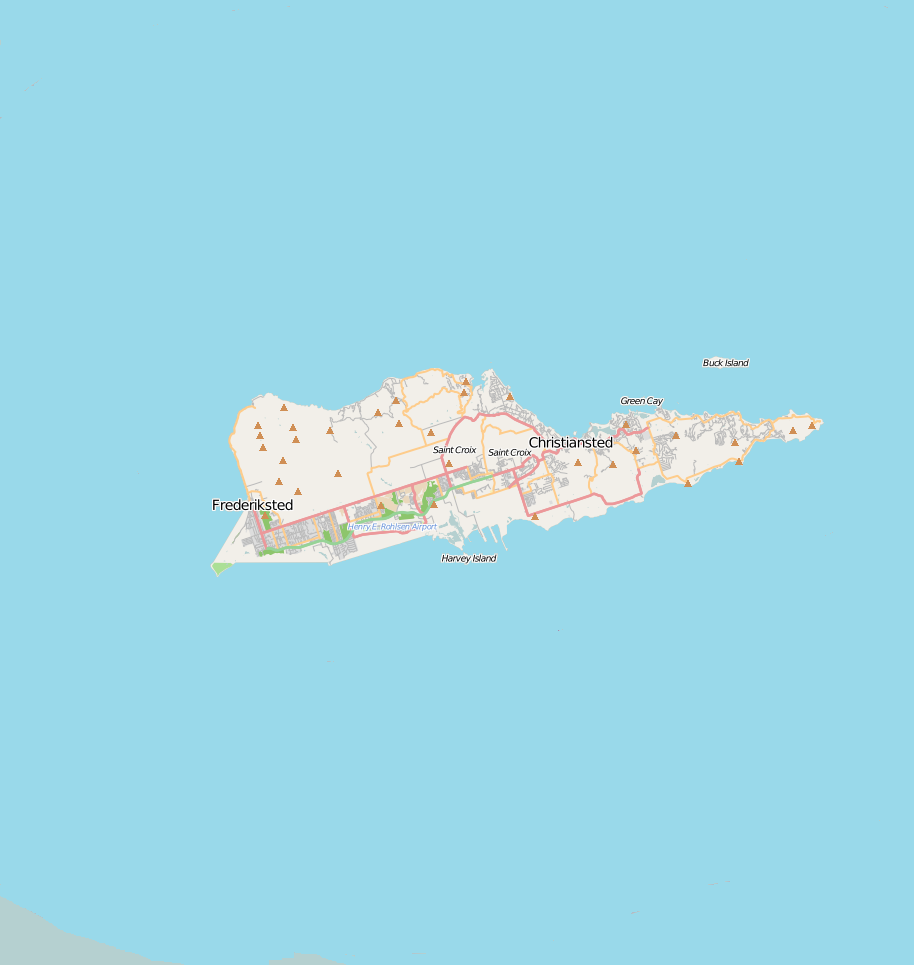
- Location within Saint Croix, US Virgin Islands Location within the U.S. Virgin Islands
- Nearest city: Frederiksted, Virgin Islands
- Coordinates: 17°44′57″N 64°53′32″W
- Area: 13.6 acres (5.5 ha)
- Built: 1764
- NRHP reference No.: 78002722
- Added to NRHP: August 25, 1978

Estate Butler's Bay, on the island of Saint Croix in the U.S. Virgin Islands, was established as a sugar plantation by 1764. It was listed on the National Register of Historic Places in 1978. The listing included five contributing buildings, a contributing structure, and five contributing sites.

== Background ==
It is located on the west coast of the island, about 2.1 miles (3.4 km) north of Frederiksted. It has also been known as Bottler's Bay.

Surviving are "two great houses, three slave quarter buildings, a cookhouse, a sugar factory, stables, an overseer's house and a number of accessory structures." A wind-powered mill to crush sugar cane has been modified and incorporated into a modern house, and is not part of the listing. More than 80 slaves worked on the plantation.

The earliest of the two great houses is a two-story building, 56 by 63 feet (17 m × 19 m) in plan, with six bays by seven bays. It has a corrugated tin hipped roof which replaced the similar roof lost in an 1828 hurricane.
