= Winding Chimney =

Landmark In Carlsberg, Denmark

Coordinates: 55°39′59″N 12°32′02″E

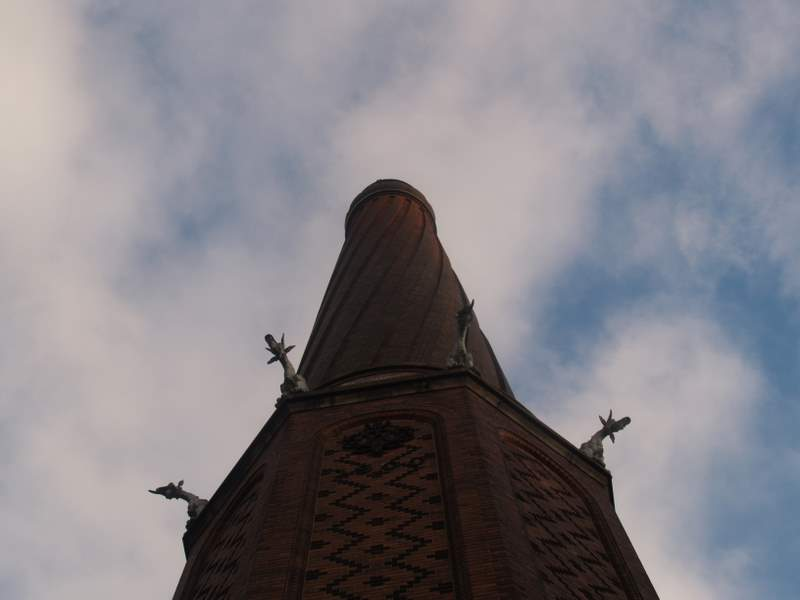
The Winding Chimney

The Winding Chimney (Danish: Den Snoede Skorsten) is a 56 m tall disused Carlsberg chimney, now serving as a landmark in the Carlsberg neighbourhood of Copenhagen, Denmark.

== History ==
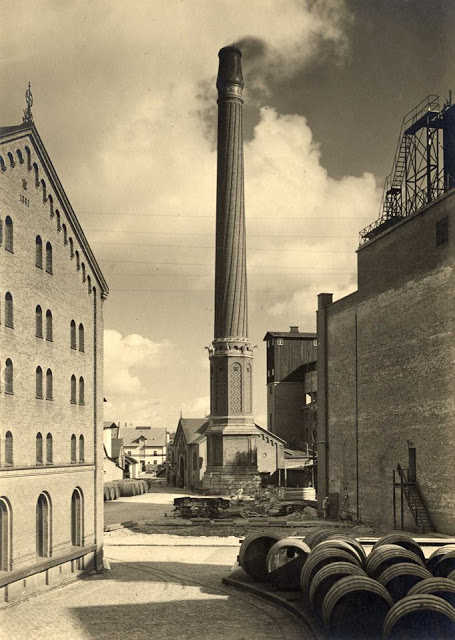
The Winding Chimney

Passionately interested in the arts, Carl Jacobsen, who had founded his New Carlsberg Brewery a decade prior, taking up competition with his father, wanted to show that a chimney for an industrial plant could be beautiful. He made his own rough sketches and brought in architect Vilhelm Dahlerup and master builder PS Beckmann. The chimney was completed in 1900. The chimney was decommissioned in 1980 after a new taller chimney had been built.

== Design ==
Built in red brick and granite, the chimney turns around its own axis and stands on an octagonal plinth. The Chimeras (Gargoyles) are replicas of those on Notre-Dame de Paris while the upper part of the chimney is decorated with motifs of Egyptian lotus flowers.
