= Wilhelm Friedrich Georg Behn =

German anatomist and zoologist

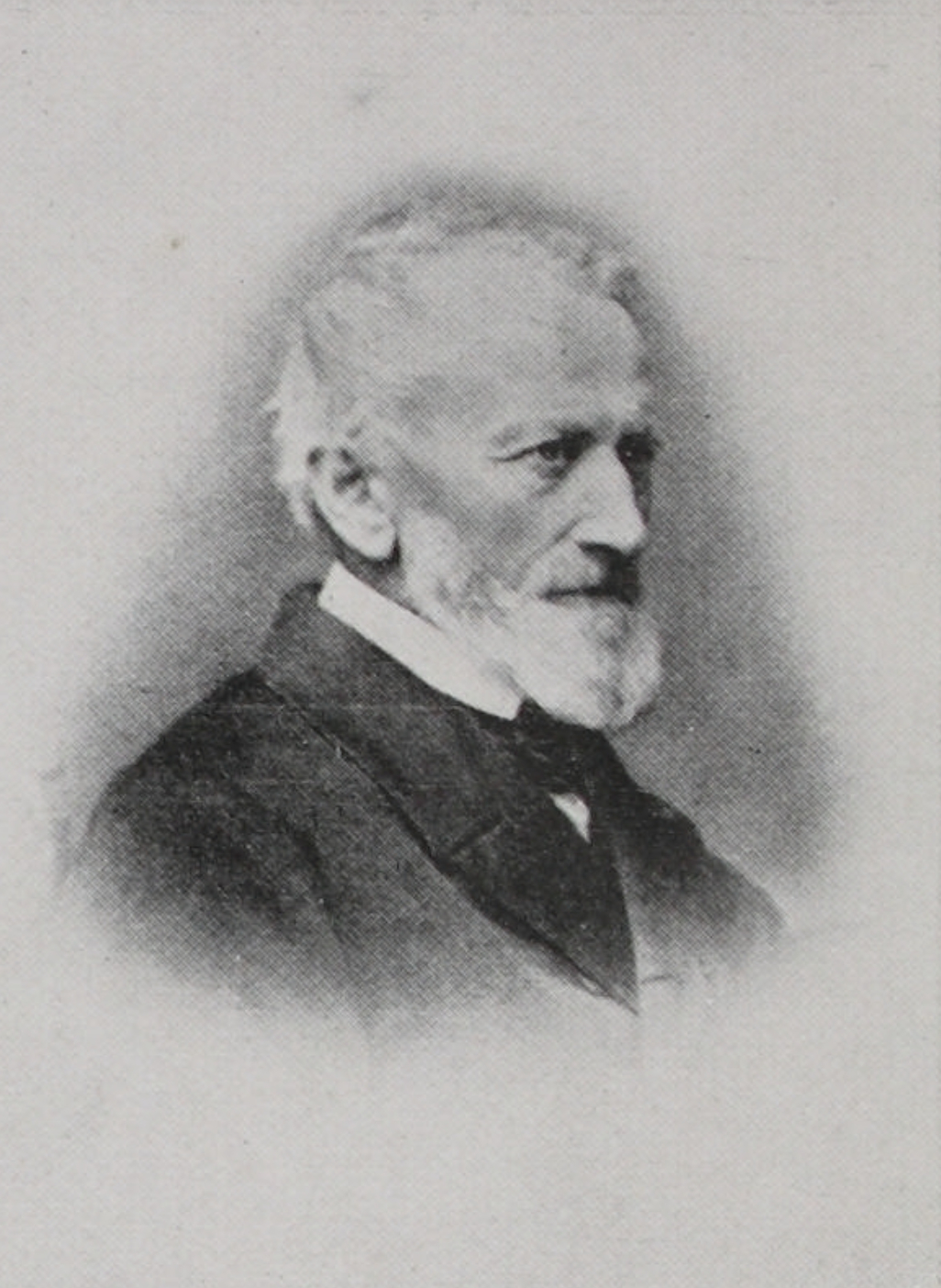
- Portrait
- Born: 25 December 1808; Kiel, Germany
- Died: 14 May 1878 (aged 69); Dresden, Germany
- Education: Universities of Göttingen and Kiel
- Occupations: Anatomist, zoologist
- Known for: President of the German Academy of Sciences Leopoldina

Wilhelm Friedrich Georg Behn (25 December 1808, Kiel – 14 May 1878, Dresden) was a German anatomist and zoologist. For eight years he was president of the German Academy of Sciences Leopoldina.

From 1828 he studied medicine at the Universities of Göttingen and Kiel, afterwards continuing his education in Paris (1834), where he made the acquaintanceships of famed scientists that included Dupuytren, Flourens, Poiseuille and Chevreul. In 1837 he was named an associate professor of anatomy and physiology as well as director of the anatomical institute and the zoological museum at Kiel.

In 1845–47 he participated in a circumnavigation of the globe aboard the Danish ship "Galathea". As a result of the expedition, he collected valuable natural history material for the zoological museum in Kiel. After his return to Kiel, he was appointed a full professor of anatomy and zoology (1848). In 1867 he resigned his professorship at Kiel as a protest against the annexation of Holstein by Prussia and the formation of the Prussian province of Schleswig-Holstein. He then relocated to Dresden, where from 1870 until his death in 1878, he served as president of the German Academy of Sciences Leopoldina.

== Associated works ==
- "Leopoldina, amtliches Organ der Kaiserlichen Leopoldino-Carolinischen Deutschen Akademie der Naturforscher. Herausgegeben" (1839 to 1923); (with Dietrich Georg Kieser, Carl Gustav Carus, Hermann Knoblauch, Karl von Fritsch).
- "George Cuvier's Briefe an C. H. Pfaff aus den Jahren 1788 bis 1792, naturhistorischen, politischen und literarischen Inhalts". 1845 (editor) Georges Cuvier's correspondence with Christoph Heinrich Pfaff in the years 1788 to 1792; natural history, politics and literary content.
- "Wilhelm Friedrich Georg Behn letters, to Dr. Didrichsen, Copenhagen, Denmark. 1855-1869", Correspondence with Ferdinand Didrichsen.
- "Leben und Werk des Anatomen, Zoologen und Physiologen Wilhelm Friedrich Georg Behn (1808-1878)", by Ingeborg Irmler (1983).
