= Vilhelm Dahlerup =

Danish architect (1836–1907)

Jens Vilhelm Dahlerup
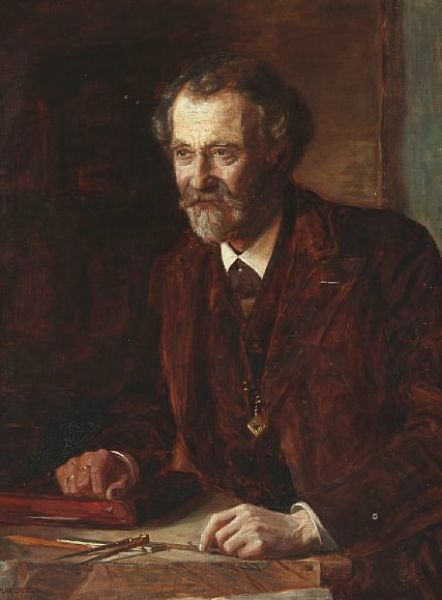
- Dahlerup painted by Luplau Jansen in 1903
- Born: 4 August 1836; Mariager, Denmark
- Died: 24 January 1907 (aged 70)
- Occupation: Architect
- Buildings: Ny Carlsberg Glyptotek; Danish National Gallery; Royal Danish Theater; Jesus Church, Valby

Signature
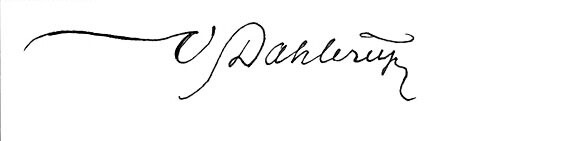

Jens Vilhelm Dahlerup (4 August 1836 – 24 January 1907) was a Danish architect who specialized in the Historicist style. One of the most productive and noted Danish architects of the 19th century, he is behind many of the most known buildings and landmarks of his time and has more than any other single architect contributed to the way Copenhagen appears today.

== Biography ==
Jens Vilhelm Dahlerup was born on 4 August 1836 outside Mariager in Northern Jutland, Denmark. He was the son of the vicar Michael Henrik Ludvig Dahlerup and Susanne Marie le Sage de Fontena. He received his first drawing lessons in Århus in 1853. He then moved to Copenhagen and began his studies at the Royal Danish Academy of Fine Arts. Dahlerup trained under G. F. Hetsch and J.H. Nebelong. In 1856 he won the Academy's silver and gold medals several times and finally a travelling scholarship. He exhibited at the Charlottenborg Spring Exhibition from 1857-59.

In 1859 he received the C.F. Hansen Medal.

During the period 1854-64, he was employed by the architect N.S. Nebelong. Later he also an artistic consultant for the Copenhagen Port Authority and for the Royal Danish Navy Shipyard.

In 1871 he became a member of the Academy, and in 1875 became a titular professor.

Vilhelm Dahlerup was a member of numerous committees and commissions, including a jury member at the 1876 World's Fair in Philadelphia and a jury member and co-arranger of the 1878 World's Fair in Paris. From 1870 he was an artistic advisor for the Port of Copenhagen and for a while he served as the house architect of Tivoli Gardens. For many years he was the preferred architect of Carl Jacobsen and was the architect behind many of the most known buildings at the Carlsberg site.

== Personal life ==
In 1885, he married Marie Vilhelmine Koch (1861-1926).

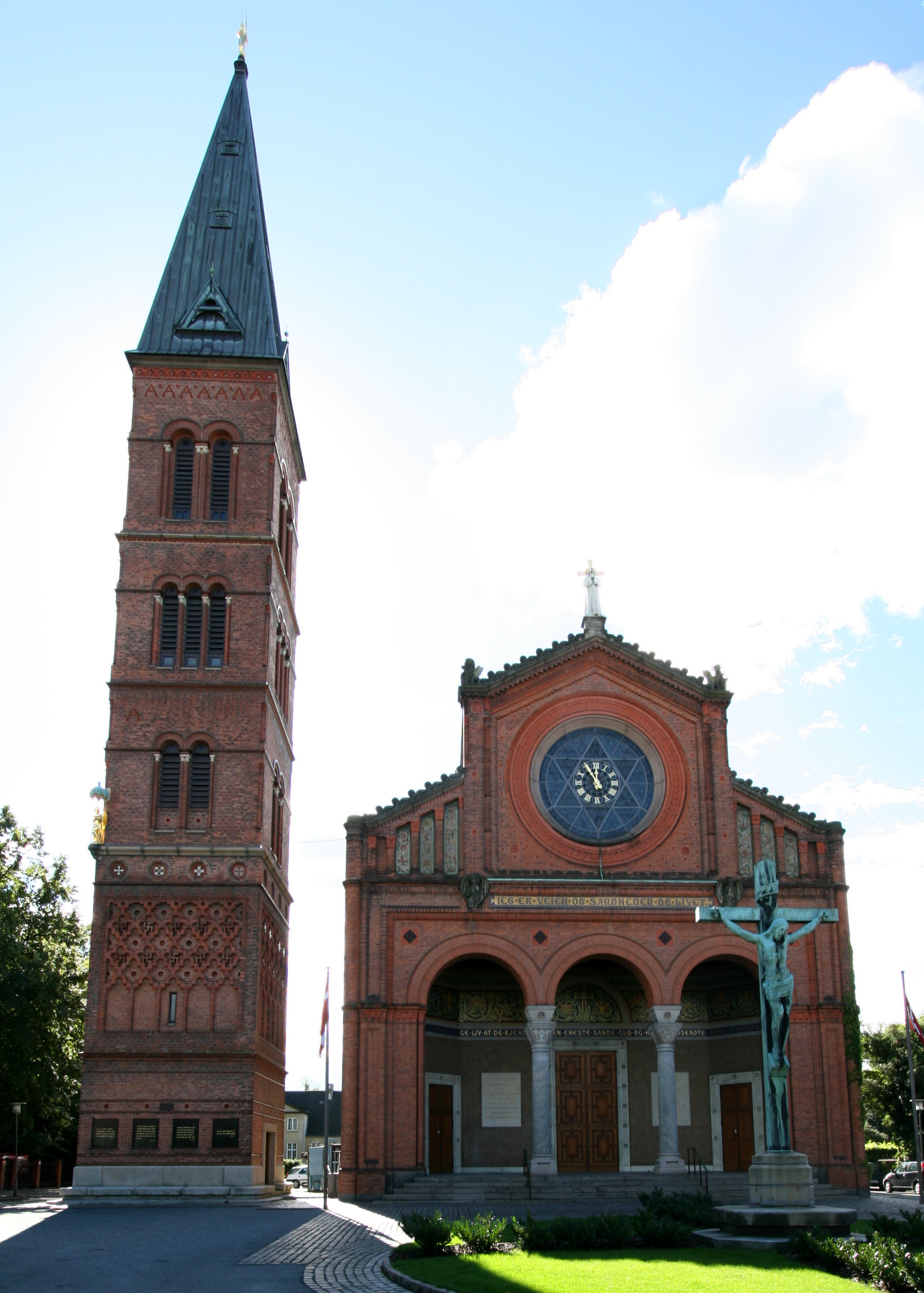
Jesus Church (Jesuskirken), Valby, Copenhagen (1885-91) with the Campanile (1894-95)

== Selected works ==
- Hotel D’Angleterre, Copenhagen (1873–75)
- Pantomimeteatret, Tivoli Gardens, Copenhagen 1874
- Ny Carlsberg Brewery, Copenhagen (1880–83)
- Ivar Huitfeldt Column, Langelinie, Copenhagen (1886)
- Queen Louise Bridge, Copenhagen (1885–87)
- Jesus Church, Valby, Copenhagen (1885–91)
- Statens Museum for Kunst, Copenhagen (1890–91) with Georg E.W. Møller
- Dahlerups Pakhus, Langelinie Allé, Copenhagen (1892–94, listed)
- Ny Carlsberg Glyptotek, Copenhagen (1891–97)
- The Dipylon Gate, Carlsberg, Copenhagen (1892)
- Lake Pavilion, Copenhagen (1894)
- Jorcks Passage, Copenhagen (1893–95)
- Mønsted Villa, now the Embassy of Russia in Copenhagen, Copenhagen (1999)
- The Winding Chimney, Carlsberg, Copenhagen (1898–99)
- The Elephant Gate & Tower, Carlsberg, Copenhagen (1900–01)
- Ny Carlsberg Glyptotek winter garden and dome, Copenhagen (1903–06)
- Royal Danish Theatre, Copenhagen (opened 1874)
- Bredgade 45, Copenhagen (1880)

== See also ==
- Architecture of Denmark
