= Antipodocottus galatheae =

Conservation status
- Least Concern (IUCN 3.1)

Scientific classification
- Kingdom: Animalia
- Phylum: Chordata
- Class: Actinopterygii
- Order: Perciformes
- Suborder: Cottoidei
- Family: Psychrolutidae
- Genus: Antipodocottus
- Species: A. galatheae

Binomial name
- Antipodocottus galatheae Bolin, 1952

Species of fish

Antipodocottus galatheae, the Galathea sculpin, is a species of marine ray-finned fish belonging to the family Cottidae, the typical sculpins. This species is found on the continental shelf around New Zealand. It has also been recorded off Tasmania, New South Wales and Queensland.

== Taxonomy ==
Antipodocottus galatheae was first formally described in 1952 by the American ichthyologist Rolf Ling Bolin. It is the type species of the genus Antipodocottus.

== Etymology ==
The specific name is taken from the Danish research ship HMDS Galathea from which the holotype was collected.
