= Frederik von Scholten =

Danish naval officer, customs inspector and amateur artist

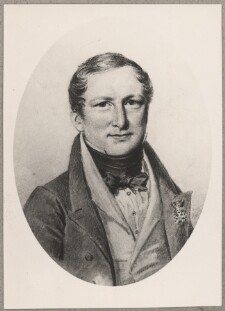
- Born: 8 April 1796; Copenhagen, Denmark
- Died: 22 December 1853 (aged 57); Saint Croix, Danish West Indies
- Burial place: Holy Trinity Lutheran Churchyard
- Military career
- Allegiance: Denmark

Frederik von Scholten (8 April 1796 – 22 December 1853) was a Danish naval officer, customs inspector and amateur artist who is today mostly remembered for his drawings and watercolours from the Danish West Indies where he worked as customs inspector from 1834. His works are frequently used as illustrations for articles and in books on the Danish colony. He was the brother of Peter von Scholten, Governor-General of the islands from 1827 to 1848.

== Early life and education ==
Frederik von Scholten was born in Copenhagen, the son of Casimir Wilhelm von Scholten and Cathrine Elizabeth von Scholten (née de Moldrup). The family moved to St. Thomas where his father served as governor. Frederik von Scholten was sent to the US to complete his schooling and from 1808 attended the Royal Naval Officers Academy in Copenhagen.

== Career ==
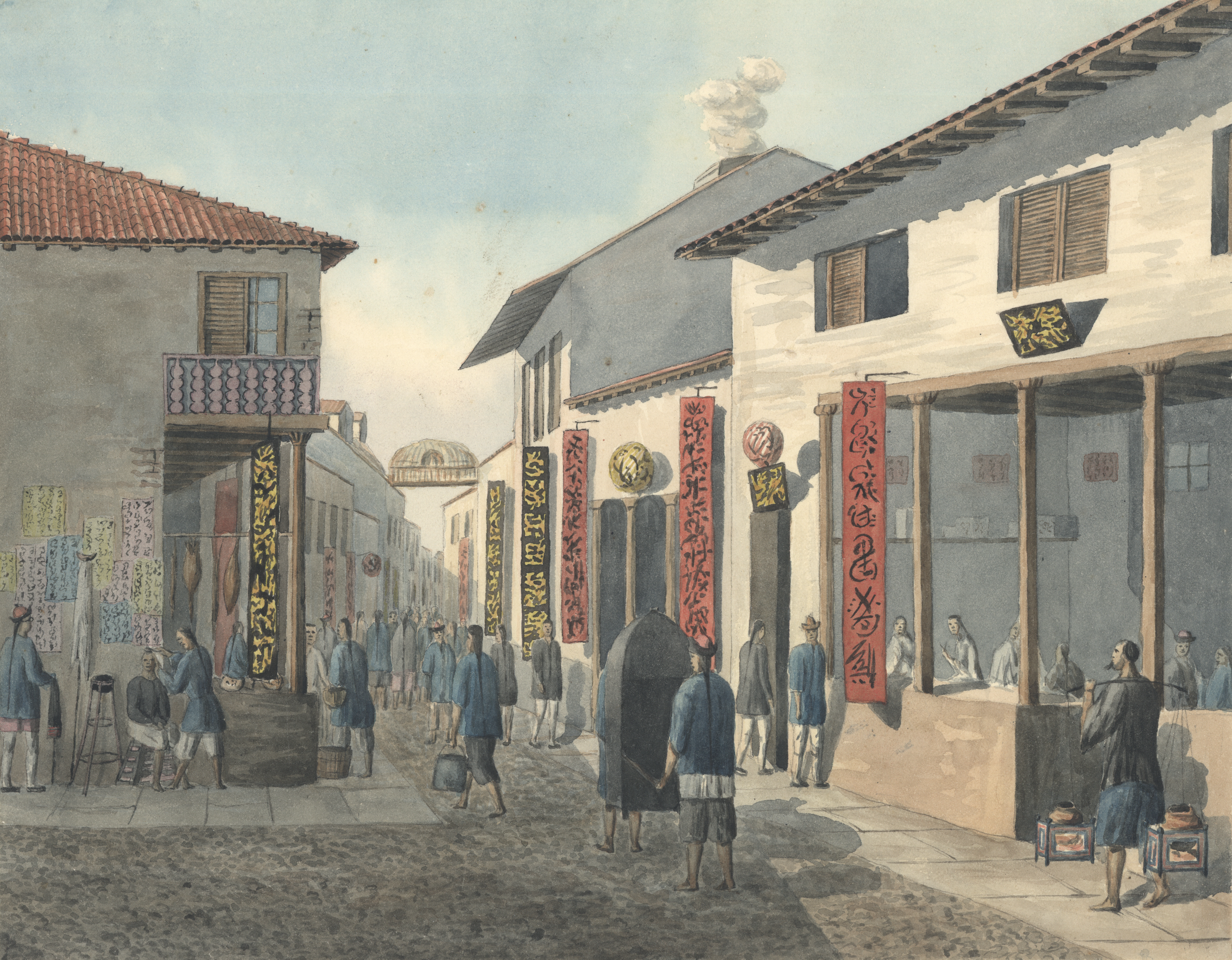
A street scene from Canton by Scholten created while he was in French service, 1830.

He then travelled widely, first as a member of naval expeditions to the Mediterranean and the Danish West Indies in 1815 to 1817, then to France in 1818 and Iceland in 1820, then to Germany, Italy and France in 1821 to 1824 and finally in French service around the world on the naval ship La Favorite in 1829 to 1831. He visited the Danish West Indies again in 1833 and settled permanently as a customs inspector in Frederiksstad on St. Croix from 1834. In 1837, he visited Venezuela.

== Works ==
Frederik von Scholten collected his drawings and watercolours in two sketch books with a total of 163 works from the period 1821–46. They are now part of the collection of the Danish Maritime Museum. He has also made a drawing of lieutenant H.A. Raupach (1833) and a plan drawing of Butlers Bay (watercolour, 1833, National Museum). Two other works, a water colour entitled View East from Bülowsminde (1834) and the Frederiksted, are now kept in the National Museum of Denmark.

== Image gallery ==
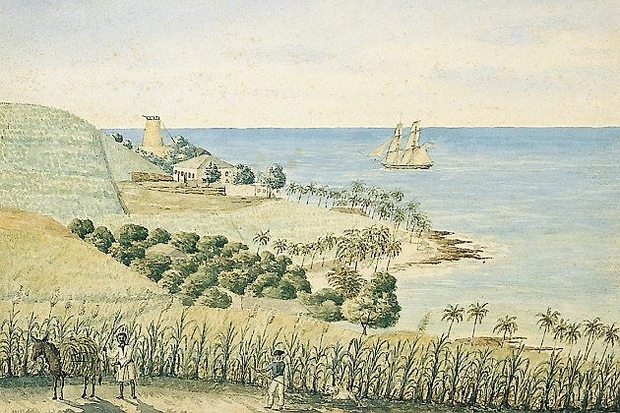
Butlers Bay, St. Croix

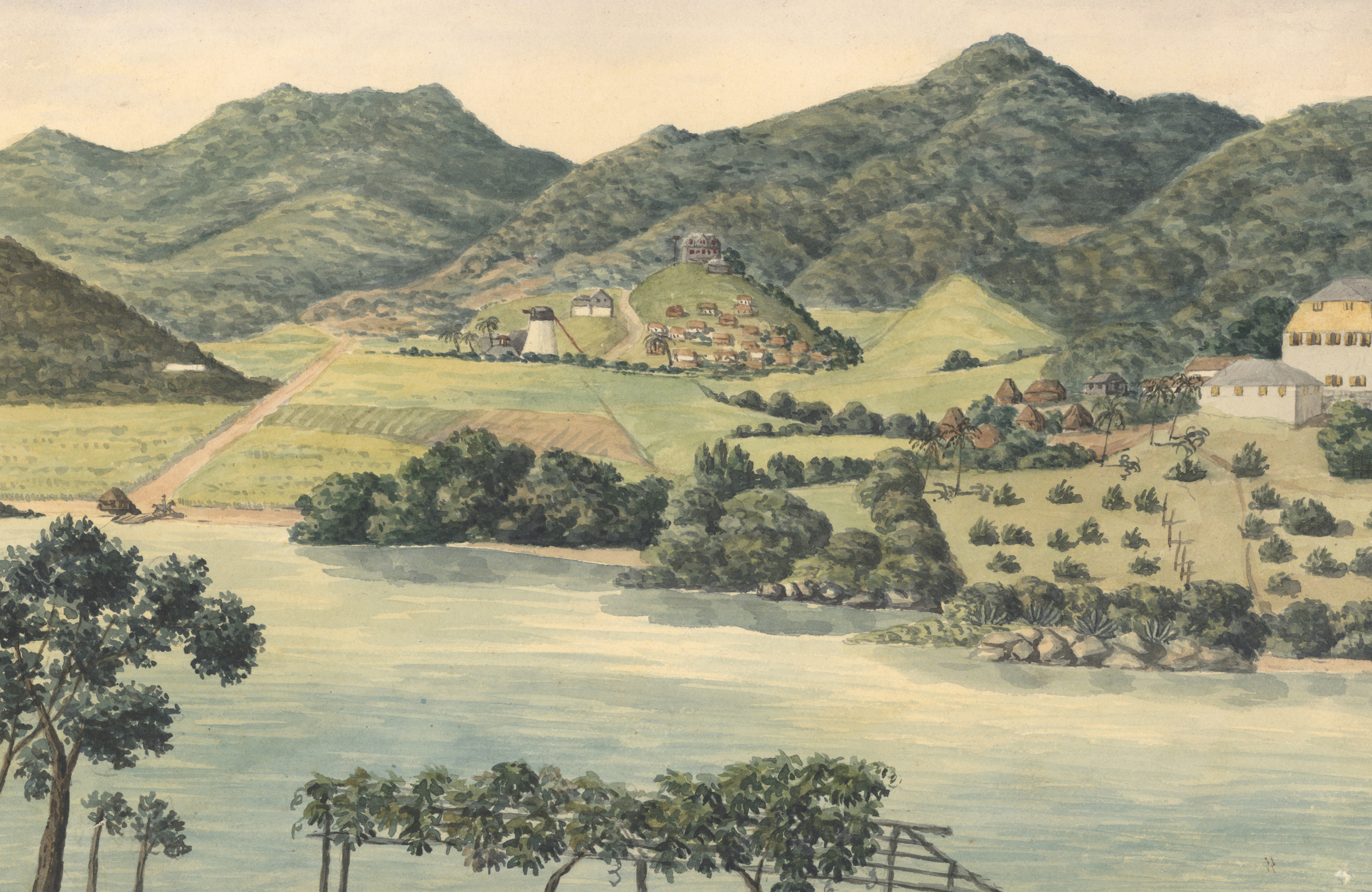
Plantation Carolina at Coral Bay, St. Jan (1833)

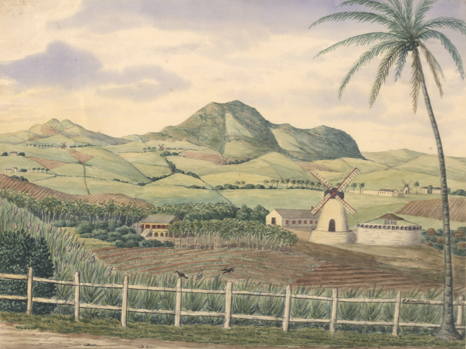
The plantation Morning Star, St. Croix (1833)

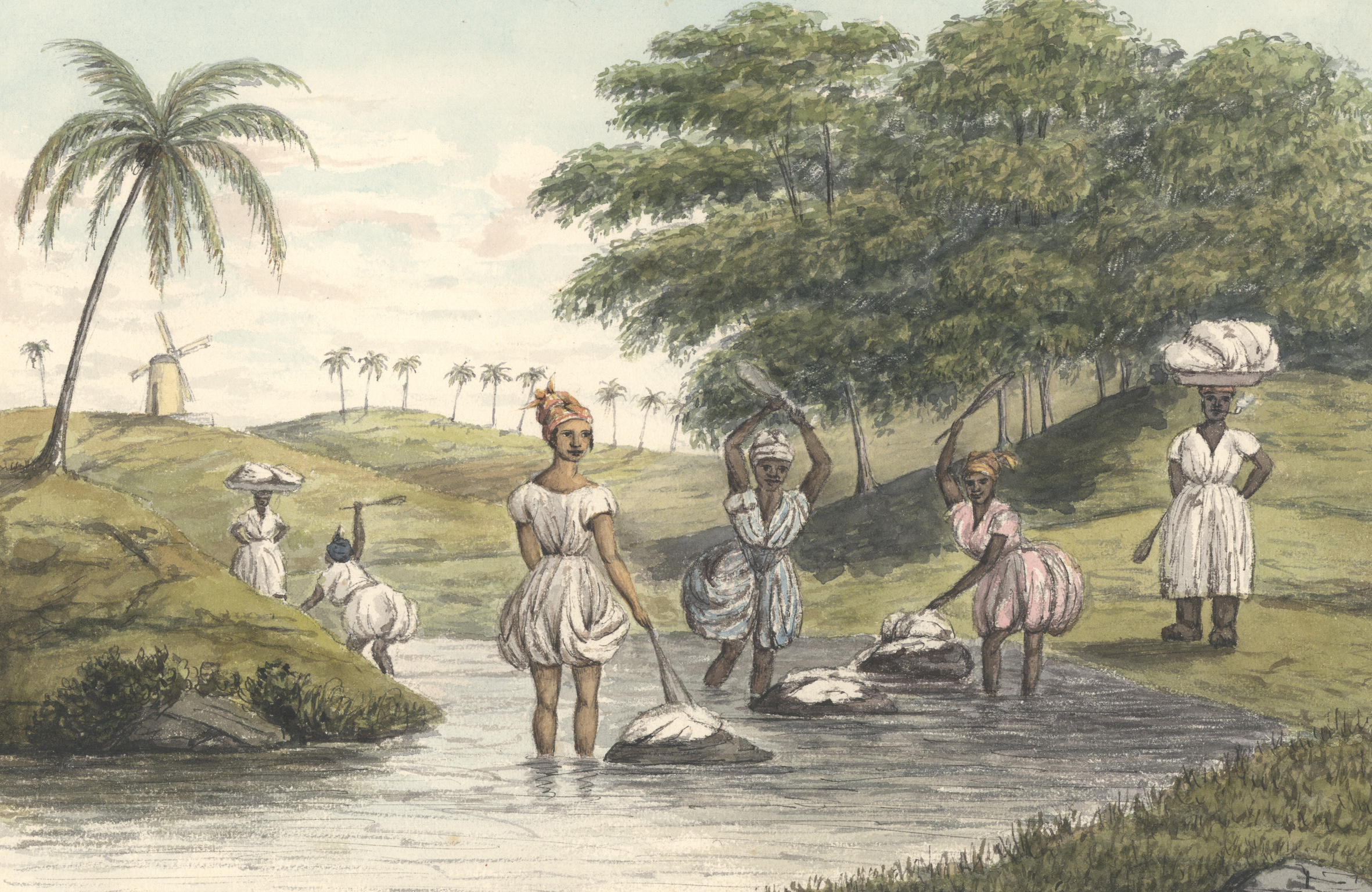
Bitling near West-End, Santa Cruz /c. 1844)

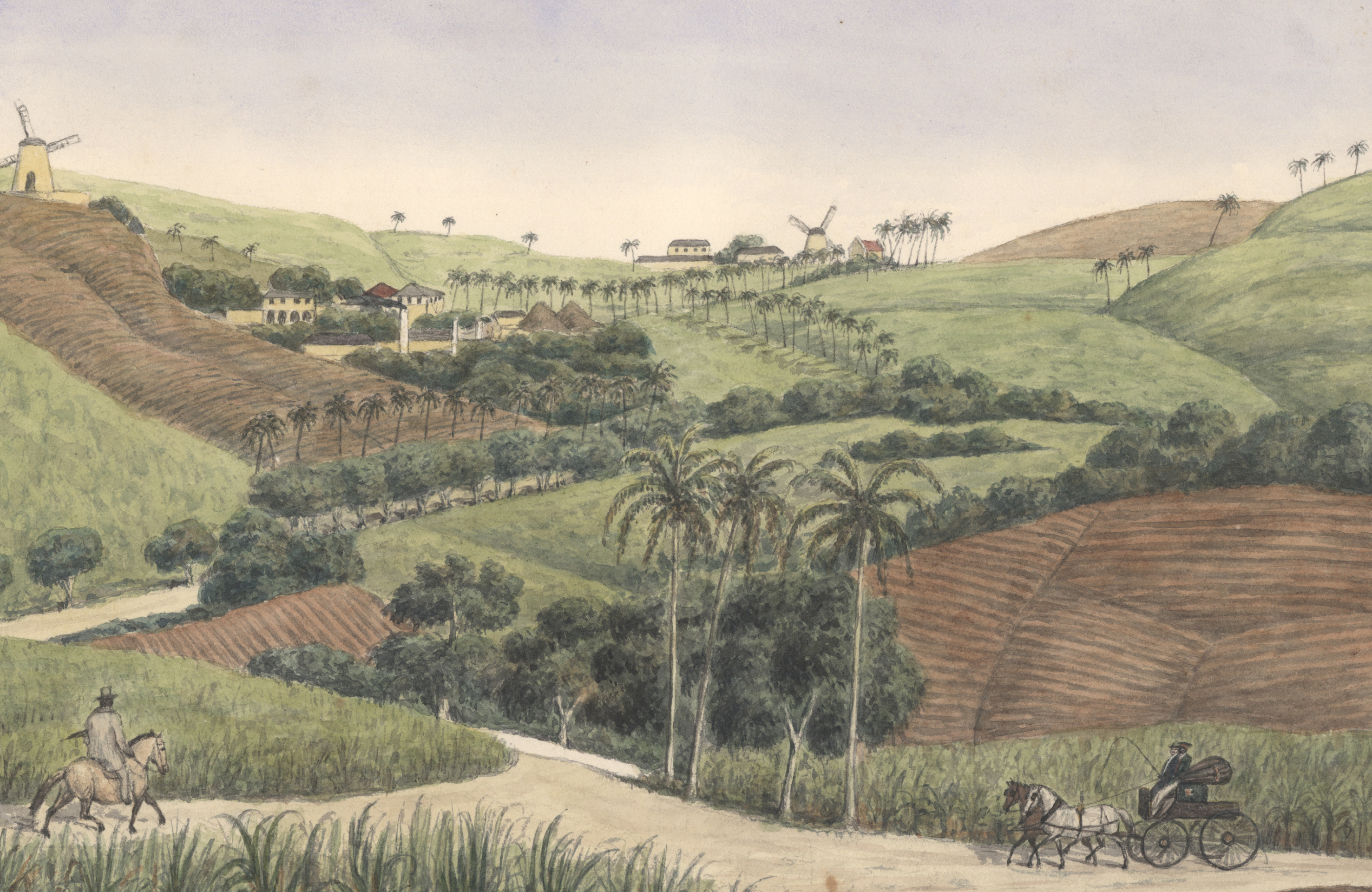
The plantations Montpellier and Two Friends. St. Croix (1846)

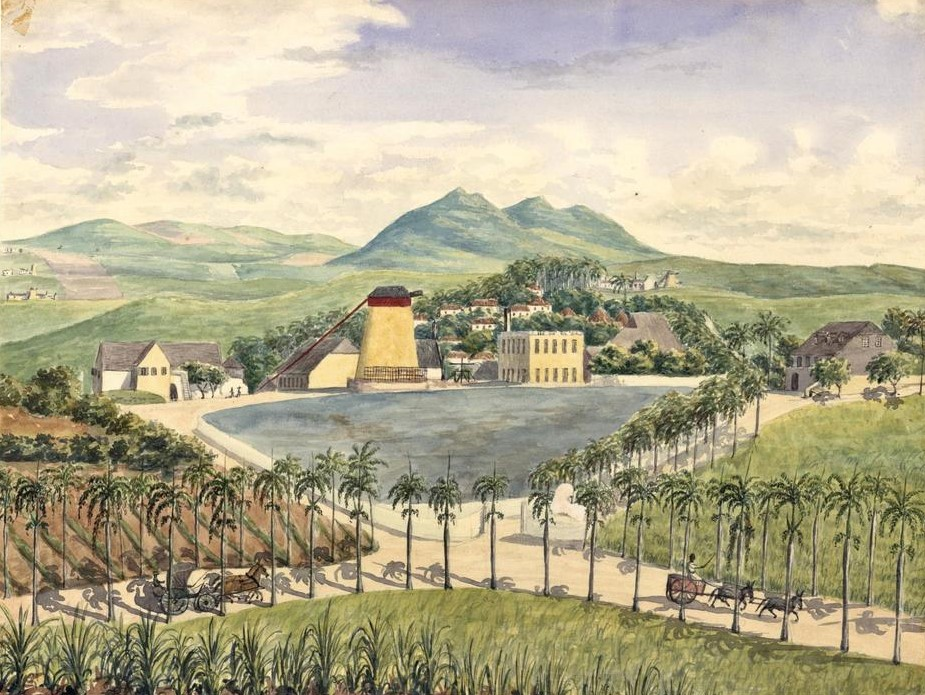
Constitution Hill

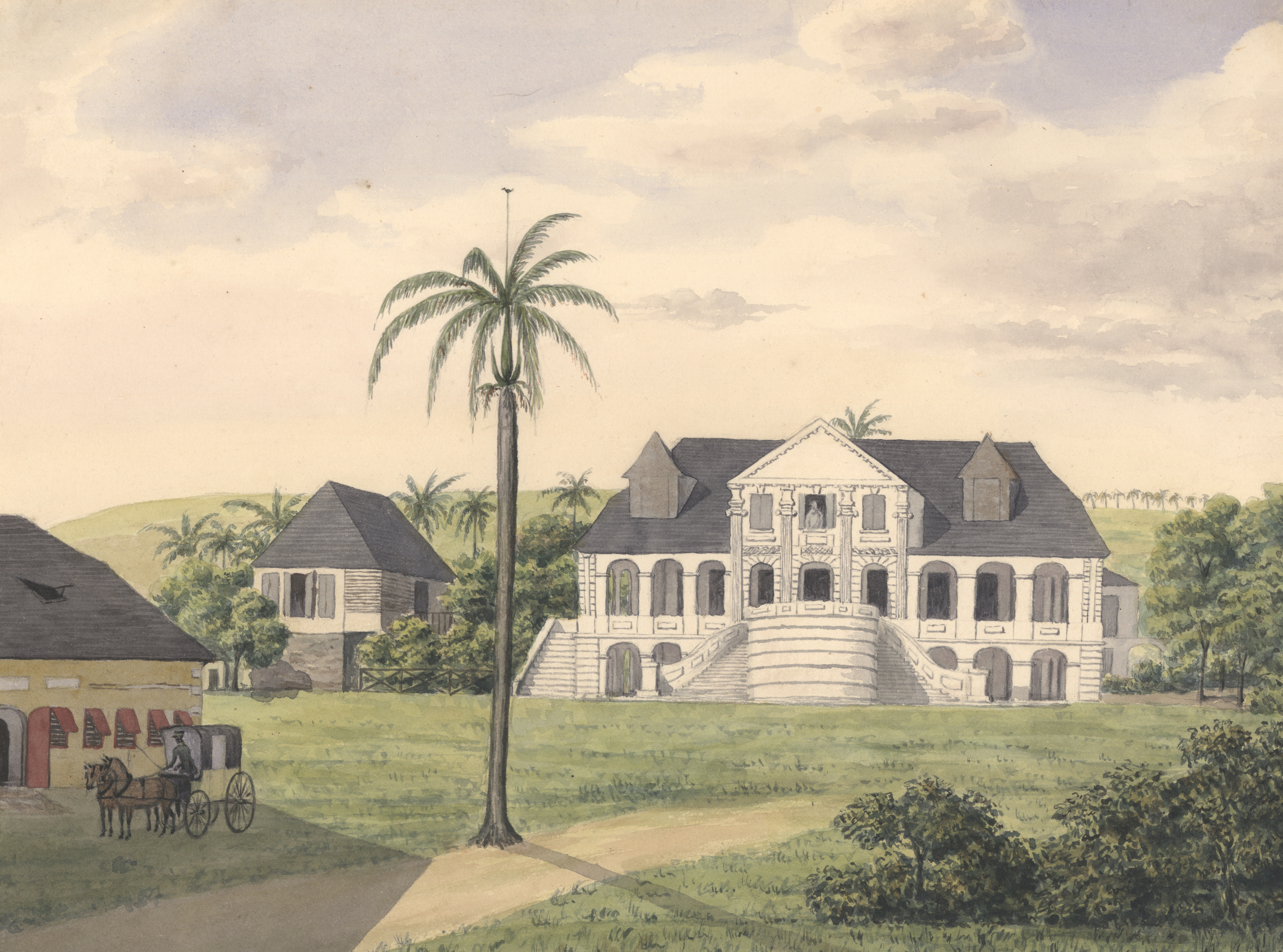
Høgensborg
