= Steen Andersen Bille (1797–1883) =

Danish naval officer and politician

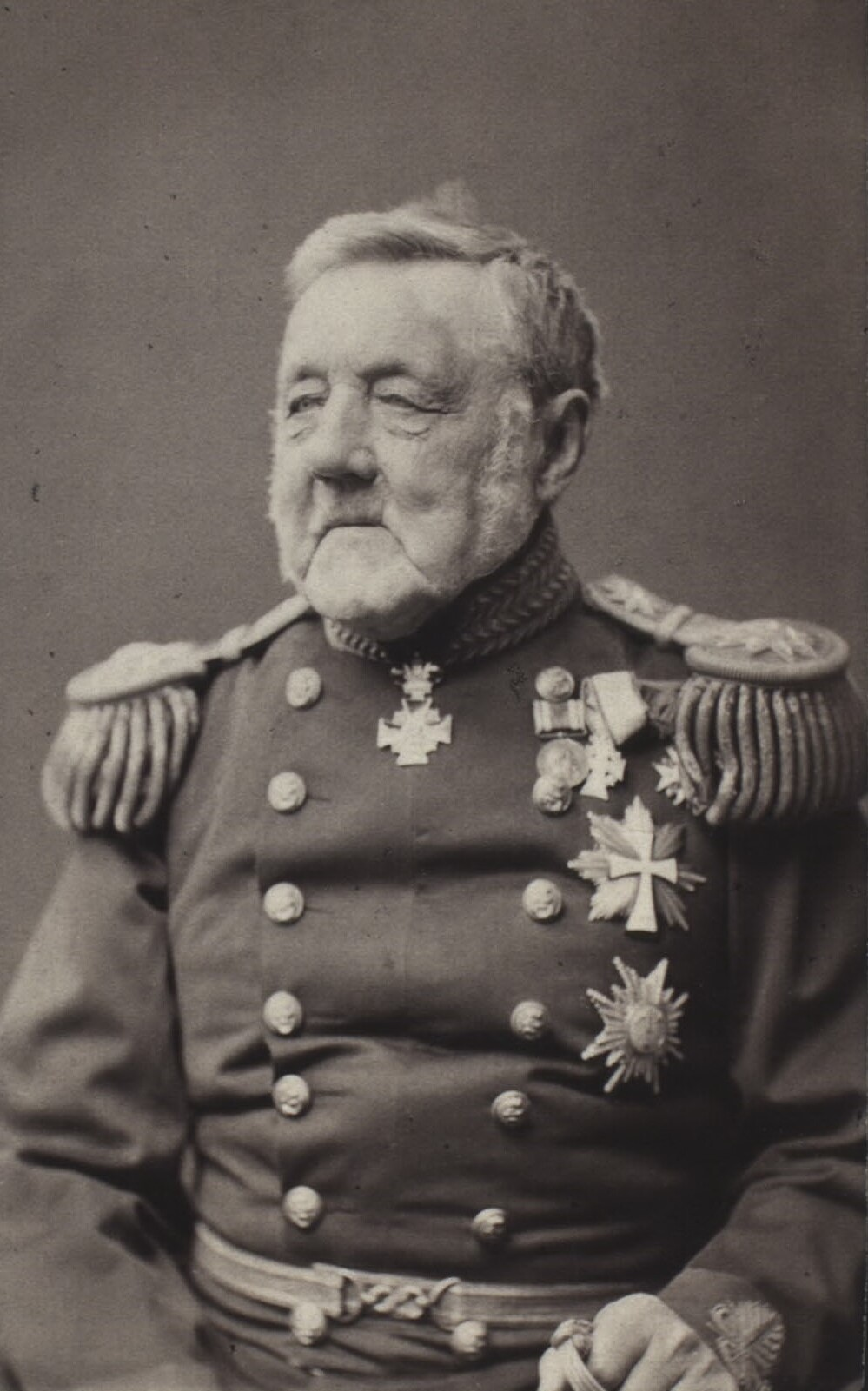
- Steen Bille in later life

Minister for the Navy
- In office 27 January 1852 – 12 December 1854
- Monarch: Frederick VII
- Prime Minister: Christian Albrecht Bluhme; Anders Sandøe Ørsted
- Preceded by: Carl van Dockum
- Succeeded by: Ove Wilhelm Michelsen
- In office 24 February 1860 – 31 December 1863
- Prime Minister: Carl Christian Hall
- Preceded by: Hans Nicolai Thestrup
- Succeeded by: Otto Hans Lütken

Personal details
- Born: 5 December 1797 Copenhagen
- Died: 2 May 1883 (aged 85) Copenhagen
- Resting place: Holmens Cemetery, Copenhagen
- Relations: Great Great Grandson of Steen Andersen Bille (1624–1698); Son of Admiral Steen Andersen Bille (1751–1833)

Military service
- Allegiance: Denmark; France
- Branch/service: Royal Danish Navy
- Years of service: 1809–1851
- Rank: Vice admiral
- Battles/wars: First Schleswig War

Vice-Admiral Steen Andersen Bille (5 December 1797 – 2 May 1883) was a Danish naval officer and politician who served as Minister for the Navy from 1852 to 1854. He served in the First Schleswig War, and Cape Steen Bille on the King Frederick VI Coast, Greenland was named in his honour by W. A. Graah.

== Early years ==
Influenced by his father's role in the defence of Copenhagen in 1807, and the visits of many leading naval figures to his parents’ house, he became a cadet (midshipman) in 1809 at the age of 12, and seven years later a junior lieutenant with an honorary position at the royal court. In this time he saw service in Minerva in both the Mediterranean and the Danish West Indies. In 1823 he was promoted to senior lieutenant.

== In French service ==
In 1820, Bille returned from the cruise in the West Indies in the frigate Minerva and entered French service along with his older brother Lieutenant Ernst Bille (who died the following year), serving in the ship-of-the-line Colosse in Brazilian waters and on South America's west coast where there was civil turmoil in both Chile and Peru. Returning via Rio de Janeiro (where the republic was declared while he was in harbour), he returned to France in October 1821 and to Denmark early in 1822. His maps and sailing notes on the various South American harbours and Cape Horn were submitted to the Danish admiralty.

As tensions between France and Spain heightened two years later, Bille again sailed with the French. On board l’Hermione he was in command of a division of bomb vessels at Cádiz, when the city was captured by the Duke of Angoulême in the Battle of Trocadero in 1823. Thereafter in Galathea to Smyrna, he continued to Greek waters where the war of independence (from Turkey) was in full swing. Here he could observe the war at close quarters, and had close personal contact with the Turkish leaders Ibrahim Kapudan Pasha and Ismail Gibraltar.

== In Danish service ==
On his return to Denmark, Bille, who was known personally by King Frederick VI, was given command of the steamship Kiel which was ”at the disposition of the king”; later as second-in-command of the brig St Thomas to the Danish West Indies and various other naval duties.

In 1830, he was appointed Gentleman Cavalier of the Royal Princess Caroline, in 1834 promoted to commander, and in 1841 to captain. As such, Bille was second-in-command of the frigate Bellona in 1840–1841 on a voyage to South America. Events on this voyage led to an investigation of his over-severe handling of the crew, but the complaints were later withdrawn. In 1844 he was in command of the training corvette Flora when she fetched Crown Prince Frederick back from Iceland. (Note: The Danish article, and Runeberg Project, have Crown Prince Frederik returned from the Faroe Islands. Topsøe-Jensen has him returning from Iceland) In 1845 Bille became captain of the corvette Galathea in which he sailed round the world, overseeing the transfer of Tranquebar and Serampore trading posts which had been sold to the British East India Company, and other trade and diplomatic duties. During the voyage part of his crew went in an Indian-built boat Ganges to the Nicobar Islands with the idea of establishing a colony there. This venture was abandoned soon afterwards on the grounds of the unhealthy climate, whereupon the British took over.

== Three Years' War ==
As the fleet was put on a war footing in 1848 at the start of the First Schleswig War (which the Danes call the Three Years' War) Bille was placed as deputy commander of the Baltic squadron in Hekla helping with the transfer of troops to Schleswig and Southern Jutland and hindering enemy bombardments. After the Prussians got involved and the Danish army retreated, his squadron blockaded their harbours. No major naval engagements took place, but Fredericia – occupied by the Germans – was bombarded by Steen from Hekla and six gunboats. Bille's popularity amongst the Danes rose considerably after this action. Later in 1848, a further promoted Bille was transferred to North Sea operations blockading the Weser and Elbe.

In 1849, again as commander of a blockading flotilla in the North Sea, he had some small encounters with armed German steamships and had to forsake the defence of the islands to the west of Jutland until he had some Danish gunboats sent via the Limfjord to flush out the enemy. In the last year of the war, after the German Bund had agreed to a peace and the fighting could be concentrated on the rebels (Schleswig Holsteiners), he was again on the east coast flying his pennant in the steamship Skimer. Again, there was little opportunity for major naval action although Bille did take part in the Battle of Mysunde near Egernfjord on 12–13 September.

Bille's naval career ended at the close of the war with a strong reputation for seamanship and leadership abilities, although sometimes overstrict with his subordinates.

== Politics ==
In January 1852 Bille was appointed minister for the navy, which post he retained even with a change in the administration until December 1854. As Britain and France became embroiled in the Crimean War, Bille ordered some naval preparations in Denmark's fleet – but without parliamentary authority – for which he was brought to impeachment proceedings but found not guilty. He represented a Copenhagen constituency in parliament, and again was given the naval portfolio from 1860 to 1863. His belief in modernising the fleet, with such unproven things as steam power, rifled naval guns and much else, invited opposition to the great expense – especially from the Liberal Party.

In 1864 Bille, now a vice admiral, travelled to China as a fully accredited representative of the state with powers to ratify the trade treaty with that nation. Bille retained an interest in public affairs, particularly those of the sea and the navy, often contributing forthright opinions in discussions in the press. He retired from state service in 1868 at the age of 70.

Decorated with several foreign honours, and the high honour of the Grand Cross of the Order of the Dannebrog in 1857, Bille died on 2 May 1883 and was buried in the family plot in Holmens Kirkegård, Copenhagen.

== Personal life ==
While a lecturer at the Danish Naval Academy in 1828 Bille married Caroline Bülow, daughter of Frantz Bülow the then Chief of the Danish Army. She gave birth to two sons; Steen Andersen Bille (1830–1905) was a navy captain. He married Siegfriede Frederikke Raben-Levetzau (1847–1932), daughter of Aron Josias von Raben-Levetzau and Siegfriede Victorine Raben-Levetzau. The younger son, Frantz Ernst Bille (1832–1912), died unmarried in London.

In 1823–1829, Billed lived with his parents in the Niels Aagesen House on Amaliegade. His next two homes were on Bredgade, first at Bredgade 32 (1830–1832) and then at Bredgade 45 (1833 – 1842). After a spell at Store Kongensgade 59 ( -1843), he was back in Bredgade, now at Bredgade 30 (1844–1846), before moving to Dronningens Tværgade 4 ( 1847–1855). He then spent a few years in Amaliegade, first ain in the now demolished building at Amaliegade 39 (1856) and then at Amaliegade 14 (1857–1869), before moving to his last home on the ground floor of the Garsdorff Mansion on Kongens Nytorv (1870–1883).

== Books by S A Bille ==
- Fra alle Lande (1869 - 1870) ("From all lands")
- Korvetten Galatheas Rejse omkring Jorden (1853) ("The corvette Galathea’s voyage round the world")
- Min Rejse til Kina (1865) ("My Journey to China")

== Citations ==
- (in Danish)T. A. Topsøe-Jensen og Emil Marquard (1935) “Officerer i den dansk-norske Søetat 1660-1814 og den danske Søetat 1814-1932“. Two volumes. Download here.
- (in Danish)Project Runeberg:Dansk biografisk Lexikon / Volume 2 pages 253 - 257 - Steen Andersen Bille (1797 -1883)
