= Ferdinand Didrichsen =

Danish botanist and physicist (1814–1887)

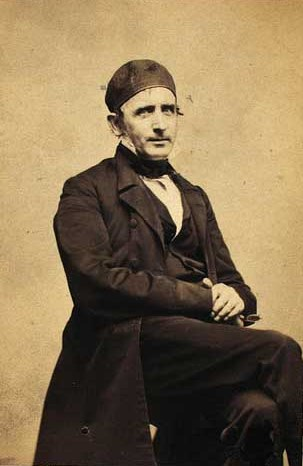
1868 portrait of Didrichsen, by Budtz Müller

Didrik Ferdinand Didrichsen (3 July 1814 in Copenhagen – 19 March 1887 in Frederiksberg) was a Danish botanist and physicist.

He participated as botanist in the first Galathea Expedition (1845—1847). In 1851, he began work as a librarian at the botanical gardens in Copenhagen. From 1856 to 1875 he was an associate professor of botany. In 1875, Didrichsen succeeded Anders Sandøe Ørsted as professor of botany at the University of Copenhagen and director of the botanic garden, whereby the already then much better known Eugen Warming was passed over. After Didrichsen's retirement in 1885, Warming succeeded him in both positions.

As a taxonomist, he described the botanical genera Mostuea, Myriogomphus, Pogonophyllum and Stenonia, as well as numerous plant species. Many of these findings were published in the Videnskabelige Meddelelser fra den Naturhistoriske Forening i Kjøbenhavn. Taxa with the specific epithet of didrichsenii are named in his honor.

== Publications ==
- Plantas nonnullas musei Universitatis Hauniensis descripsit, 1854.
- For hundrede Aar siden : smaa Samlinger til et Tidsrum af den danske Botaniks Historie : særskilt Aftryk af "Naturhistorisk Tidsskrift", 3. R. 6. B., 1869.
