= Willem River =

River named in 1618 during voyage of Mauritius

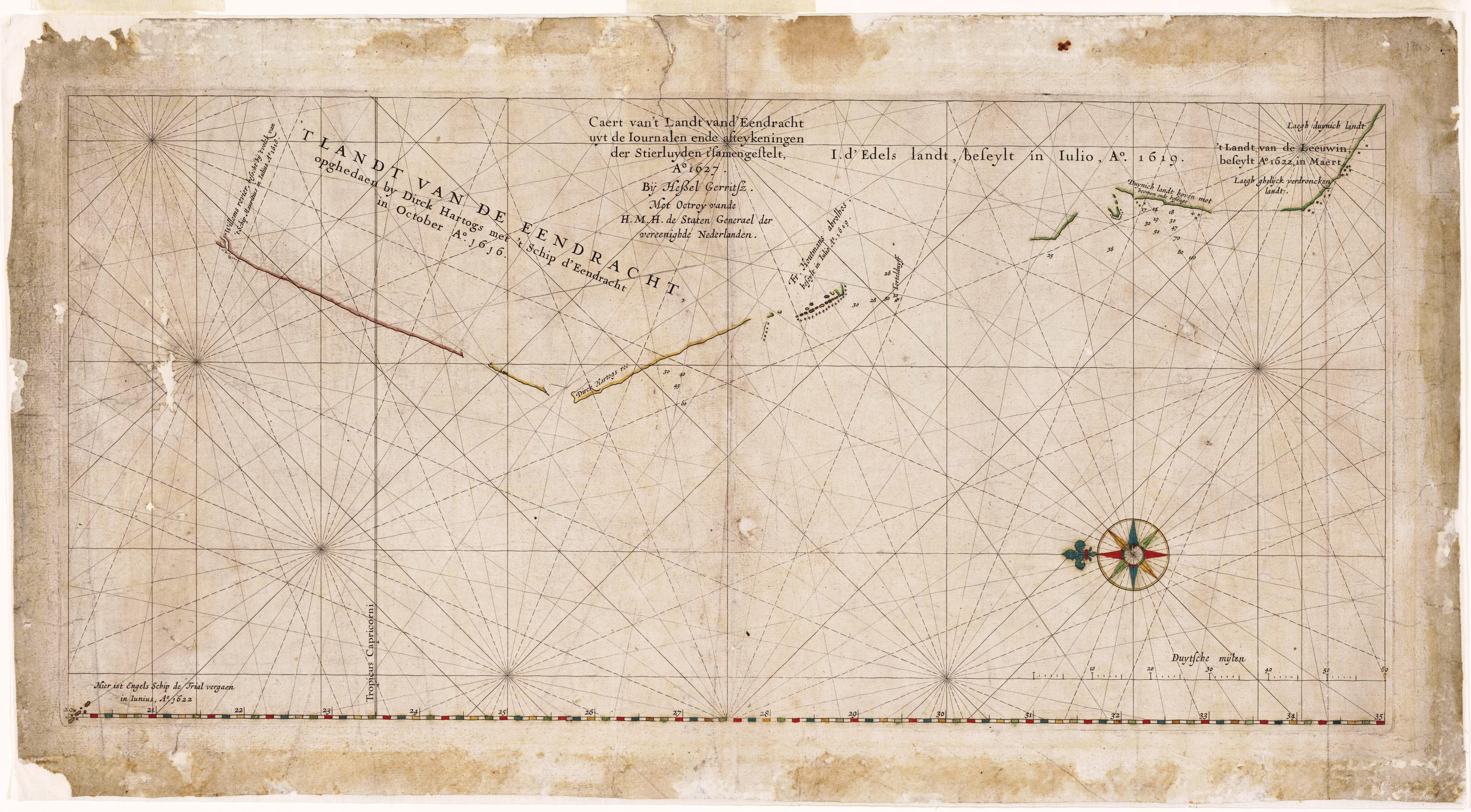
Caert van't Landt van d'Eendracht (transl. Chart of the Land of Eendracht)

The Willem River or Willem's River was named during the voyage of the Dutch East India Company ship Mauritius in 1618, under the command of Supercargo Willem Janszoon and captained by Lenaert Jacobszoon, and is one of the few features named on a nautical chart made in 1627.

It seems reasonable that Willem River was almost certainly named after Supercargo Willem Janszoon, the Commander of the ship Mauritius. Janszoon was captain of the Duyfken in 1605–1606, when part of the Gulf of Carpentaria was mapped, during the earliest documented visit to Australia by a vessel from Europe.

Caert van't Landt van d'Eendracht (transl. Chart of the Land of Eendracht) is a 1627 chart made by Hessel Gerritsz and is one of the earliest charts showing the coastline of Western Australia. The Willem River is located to the extreme left (north) end of the coastline on the chart and a closer view is provided below.

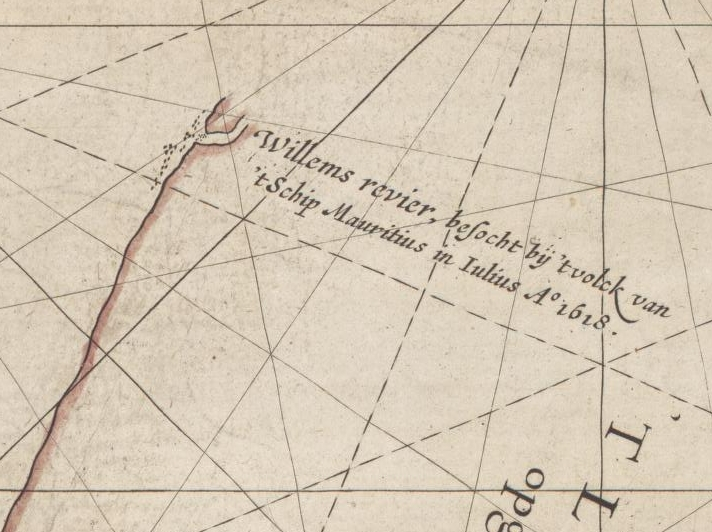
Caert van't Landt van d'Eendracht (detail naming the Mauritius as ship used for the discovery of Willem's River) by Hessel Gerritsz, stating, Willems revier, besocht by 't volck van 't Schip Mauritius in Iulius A° 1618 (transl. Willem's River, visited by the crew of the ship Mauritius in July 1618). This cropped image has been reoriented 90 degrees clockwise from the original chart so that north is at the now customary top.

== Is Willem River the Ashburton River? ==
Ashburton River is almost exactly at the latitude at which Hessel Gerritsz’ chart shows Willem River.

It is believed that the Willem River of 1618 is the Ashburton River in Western Australia. The chart shows Willems revier, besocht by 't volck van 't Schip Mauritius in Iulius A° 1618 (transl. Willem's River, visited by the crew of the ship Mauritius in July 1618).

The detail of the river's position on the chart backs up the claim that this is the Ashburton River, which, being at 21°40′S 114°56′E, is almost exactly the latitude shown on the chart. The chart is oriented with north to the left, showing lines of latitude from 20th parallel south to the 35th parallel south at the base of the map. The lines of latitude appear to be very accurate, matching closely known features through the length of the chart.

Other factors to back up that this is the Ashburton River is that it takes almost a 90 degree turn north-east once in the mouth as shown on the chart, and the northern headland of the river mouth in reality is of the same shape as shown on the chart. However, significant changes to the river delta since 1963 alone have been observed. These changes include channel and mouth movements, and erosion and formation of spits. For example, between 1973 and 2008 the eastern spit at Entrance Point migrated eastwards by approximately 2.2 kilometres (1.4 mi).

== 1627 chart accuracy ==
A note on the chart's accuracy is given by the author Heeres in 1899, from the following excerpt.

The 1627 chart is specially interesting. Gerritsz., at the time cartographer in ordinary to the E.I.C., has "put together this chart of the Landt van d'Eendracht from the journals and drawings of the Steersmen", which means that he availed himself of authentic data ^{7)}. He acquitted himself of the task to admiration, and has given a very lucid survey of the (accidental) discoveries made by the Dutch on the west-coast of Australia. In this chart of 1627 the Land of d'Eendracht takes up a good deal of space. To the north it is found bounded by the "Willemsrivier", discovered in July 1618 by the ship Mauritius, commanded by Willem Janszoon [...]. According to the chart this "river" is in about 21° 45' S. Lat., but there are no reliable data concerning this point.

[...]

^{7)} It is evident that he did not use all the data then available. Thus, for instance, he left unused those furnished by the Zeewolf [...], and those of the ship Leiden [...].

— Jan Ernst Heeres, 1899

What Heeres means by the sentence, According to the chart this "river" is in about 21° 45' S. Lat., but there are no reliable data concerning this point, is that in 1899 they had no reliable information about exactly what was at that latitude.

== Mauritius at North West Cape ==
On 31 July 1618, the Mauritius reached North West Cape (west of Exmouth Gulf), where crew members went ashore and saw footprints; this was the closest that Europeans had yet come to making contact with indigenous Australians in Western Australia.

Janszoon and Jacobszoon assumed that the cape was an island: the notion later took hold amongst mariners and cartographers, to the extent that it was named "Cloates Island" in 1720 and this misconception lingered until the 19th century.

As Willem's River was also named in July it would appear that the Mauritius, which reached Bantam, Indonesia on 22 August 1618, discovered the river on the same day that they reached North West Cape (that is, 31 July 1618, the last day of July).

The 1627 chart was based on a number of voyages, beginning with the 1616 voyage of Dirk Hartog. On that voyage Hartog named Eendrachtsland after his ship Eendracht (lit. 'Unity'). Eendrachtsland is one of the earliest names given to the Australian mainland.
