= Mauritius (1612) =

Dutch sailing ship that visited Western Australia in July 1618

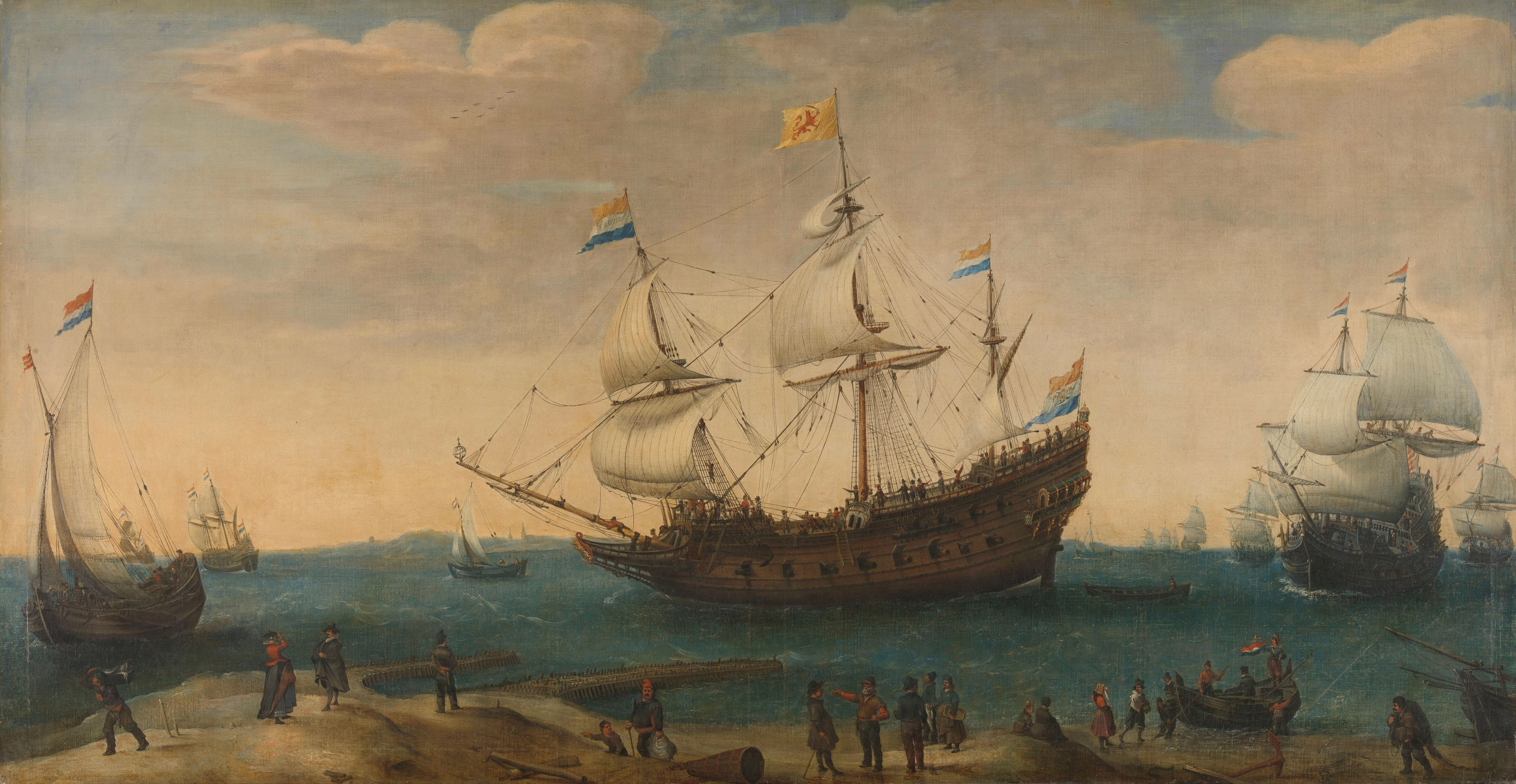
- Painting at the Rijksmuseum in Amsterdam depicting Mauritius, c. 1618

History

Netherlands
- Name: Mauritius
- Namesake: The island of Mauritius
- Owner: Dutch East India Company
- Route: Holland to Bantam, Indonesia
- Launched: 1612
- In service: 1618–1622 (Documented)

General characteristics VOC Ship Mauritius
- Type: Wooden-hulled sailing ship

Service record
- Commanders: Willem Janszoon; Lenaert Jacobszoon

Mauritius was an early 17th century Dutch wooden-hulled sailing ship, documented as being in service to the Dutch East India Company between 1618 and 1622.

== History ==
=== 1618 discoveries ===
On the 1618 voyage, the ship was commanded by Supercargo Willem Janszoon and captained by Lenaert Jacobszoon, when they sighted North West Cape in Western Australia on 31 July 1618. On that occasion they had believed that the mainland peninsular west of the Exmouth Gulf, was an island. They went ashore there and it is written that they discovered human footprints, as follows.

Letter Of supercargo WILLEM JANSZ(OON) to the Managers of the Amsterdam

Chamber, October 6, 1618. A. Worshipful Wise Provident Discreet Gentlemen,

(Sailed 1000 miles to eastward in 38 degrees with notable success.)

The present serves only to inform you that on the 8th of June last with the ship Mauritius we passed Cape de bon esperence, with strong westerly winds, so that we deemed it inadvisable to call at any land, after which we ran a thousand miles to eastward in 38 degrees Southern Latitude, though we should have wished to go still further east.

On the 31st of July we discovered an island and landed on the same, where we found the marks of human footsteps--on the west-side it extends N.N.E. and S.S.W.; it measures 15 miles in length, and its northern extremity is in 22° S. Lat. It bears Eendracht S.S.E. and N.N.W. from the south-point of Sunda at 240 miles' distance; from there (Eendrachtsland (Note: This marginal note was made by an official of the East India Company, when the letter had reached its destination.)) through God's grace we safely arrived before Bantam on the 22nd of August...

Done on board the ship 't Wapen van Amsterdam, October 6, 1618.

— Willem Janszoon, 6 October 1618

=== 1627 chart of Eendrachtsland ===
Mauritius is mentioned on the Caert van't Landt van d'Eendracht (transl. Chart of the Land of Eendracht), which is a 1627 chart by Hessel Gerritsz and one of the earliest charts that shows Australia.

==== Willems Rivier (1618) on the 1627 chart ====
On the 1618 voyage, the crew visited and partly mapped a river which was named Willems Rivier. This river was most likely named after the commander of the ship Mauritius, Supercargo Willem Janszoon. The chart has annotation Willems revier, besocht by 't volck van 't Schip Mauritius in Iulius A° 1618 (transl. Willem's River, visited by the crew of the ship Mauritius in July 1618).

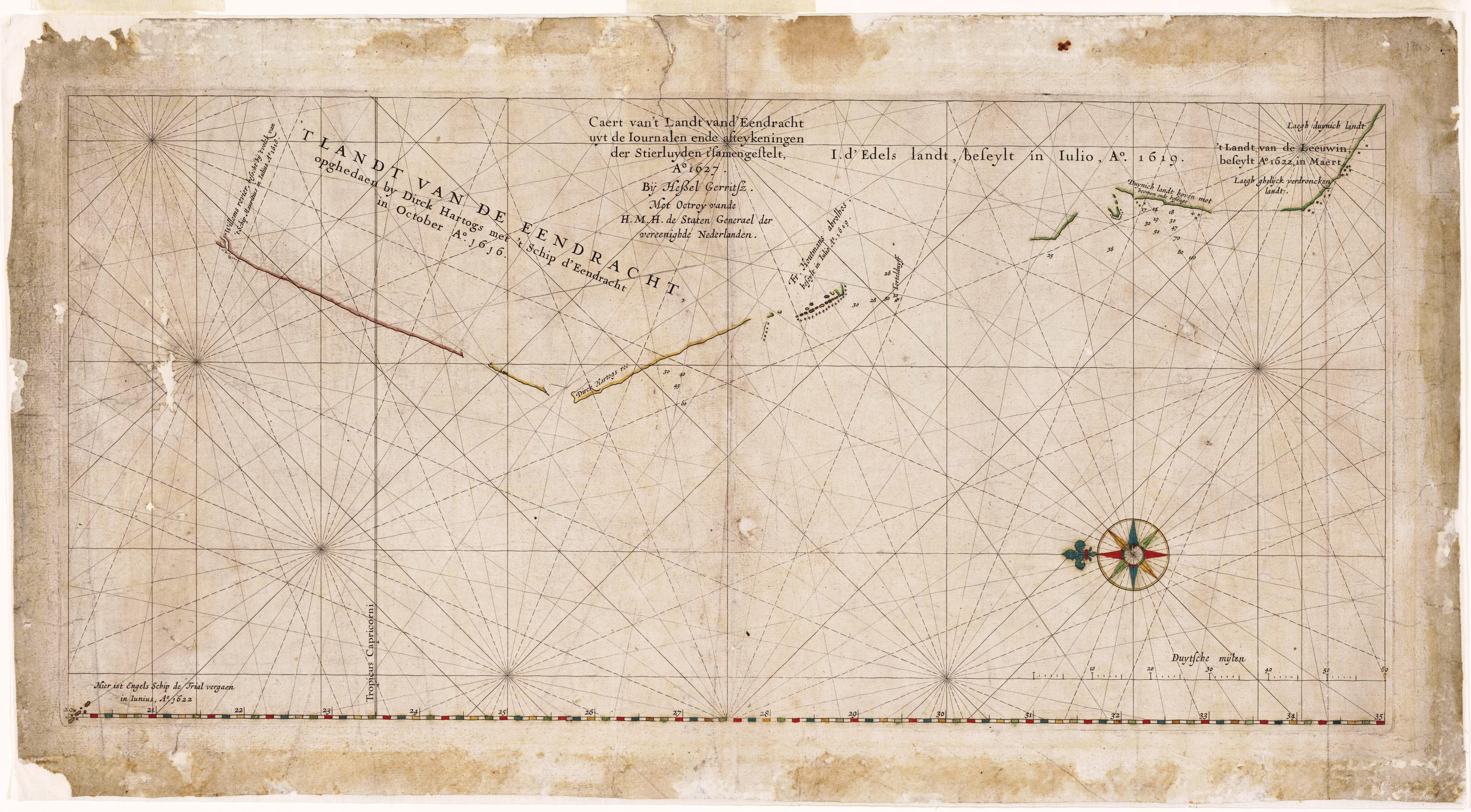
Caert van't Landt van d'Eendracht

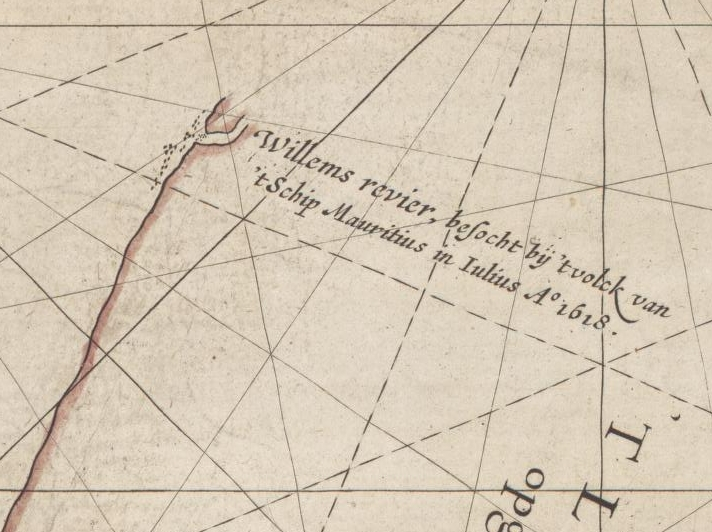
Caert van't Landt van d'Eendracht (detail naming Mauritius as ship used for the discovery of Willem's River) by Hessel Gerritsz, stating, Willems revier, besocht by 't volck van 't Schip Mauritius in Iulius A° 1618 (transl. Willem's River, visited by the crew of the ship Mauritius in July 1618). This cropped image has been reoriented 90 degrees clockwise from the original chart with north at the now customary top.

==== Commander Willem Janszoon ====
The Commander of the ship Mauritius, Supercargo Willem Janszoon, was captain of Duyfken in 1605–1606, when part of the Gulf of Carpentaria was mapped, during that earliest documented visit to Australia by a vessel from Europe.

==== Willems Rivier – Ashburton River ====
The 1618 named Willem's River is believed to be the Ashburton River. The detail of the river's position on the chart backs up the claim that Willem's River is the Ashburton River, which, being at 21 degrees 40 minutes south and 114 degrees 56 east, is almost exactly the latitude shown on the chart and discussed in other writing.

==== Eendrachtsland (1616) - Australia ====
The chart was based on a number of voyages, beginning with the 1616 voyage of Dirk Hartog. On that voyage Hartog named Eendrachtsland after his ship Eendracht, meaning 'concord' or 'unity'. The name Eendrachtsland appeared on subsequent charts.

=== Mauritius reaches Bantam ===
The ship Mauritius reached its destination Bantam, Indonesia on 22 August 1618.

Mauritius is mentioned in September 1622, as follows.

But in the meantime, in the years 1616, 1618, 1619 and 1622, the west coast of this great unknown south land from 35° to 22° S. latitude was discovered by outward bound ships, and among them by the ship Endraght [Eendracht]; for the nearer discovery of which the governor-general, Jan Pietersz Coen (of worthy memory) in September, 1622, despatched the yachts De Haring and Harewind; but this voyage was rendered abortive by meeting the ship Mauritius, and searching after the ship Rotterdam.
