= List of ship launches in the 1610s =

This list of ship launches in the 1610s includes a chronological list of some ships launched from 1610 to 1619.

	Ship	Class / type	Builder	Location	Country	Notes
25 July 1610	Prince Royal	Royal Ship	Woolwich Dockyard	Kent	England	For Royal Navy
1613	Mauritius	East Indiaman			Dutch Republic	For Dutch East India Company
1613	New Year's Gift	East Indiaman			England	For East India Company
1613	Phoenix	Warship			England	For Princess Elizabeth
1613	Date Maru	Galleon	Date Masamune	Ishinomaki	Japan	
Winter 1614	Onrust	Privateer	Adriaen Block	New York Bay	Dutch Republic	First ship built in New York
1615	Eendracht	East Indiaman	Amsterdam Dockyard	Amsterdam	Dutch Republic	For Dutch East India Company
1619	Constant Reformation	Great ship	Deptford Dockyard	London	England	For Royal Navy
1619	Happy Entrance	Middling ship	Deptford Dockyard	London	England	For Royal Navy
1619	't Wapen van Hoorn	Fluyt			Dutch Republic	For Dutch East India Company
