= Jacobszoon =

Jacobszoon is a surname. Notable people with the surname include:

- Jan Jacobszoon Hinlopen (1626–1666), rich Dutch cloth merchant, officer in the civic guard, real estate developer, alderman and art collector
- Jan Jacobszoon May van Schellinkhout, Dutch seafarer and explorer
- Lenaert Jacobszoon, captain of the Dutch East India Company who, in 1618 sighted North West Cape in the north-west of Western Australia
