= Leeuwin (1621) =

Dutch galleon

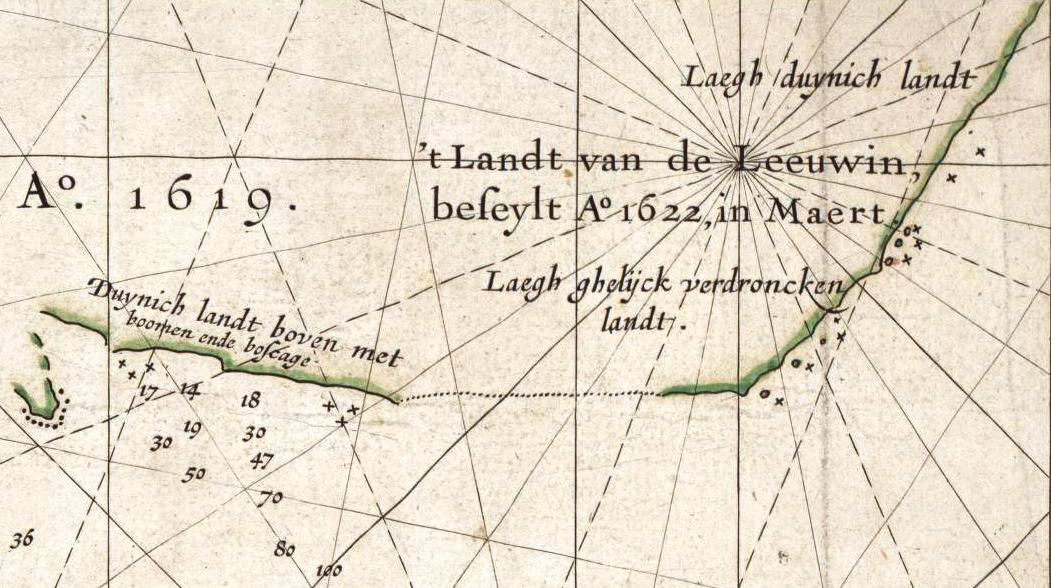
Detail of Caert van't Landt van d'Eendracht, showing a section of the coast of southwest Australia, discovered by Leeuwin in March 1622

Leeuwin ("Lioness"), also spelt Leeuwine in some Dutch East India Company (VOC) documents, was a Dutch galleon that discovered and mapped some of the southwest corner of Australia in March 1622. It was captained by Jan Fransz and was the seventh European ship to sight the continent.

Leeuwin's logbook has been lost, so very little is known of the voyage. However, VOC letters indicate that the voyage from Texel to Batavia took more than a year, whereas other vessels had made the same voyage in less than four months; this suggests that poor navigation may have been responsible for the discovery. The same is suggested by the 1644 instructions to Abel Tasman, which states that

"[I]n the years 1616, 1618, 1619 and 1622, the west coast of the great unknown South-land from 35 to 22 degrees was unexpectedly and accidentally discovered by the ships d'Eendracht, Mauritius, Amsterdam, Dordrecht and Leeuwin, coming from the Netherlands."

The land discovered by Leeuwin is recorded in Hessel Gerritsz' 1627 Caert van't Landt van d'Eendracht (Chart of the Land of Eendracht). This map includes a section of coastline labelled 't Landt van de Leeuwin beseylt A° 1622 in Maert ("Land made by the ship Leeuwin in March 1622"), which is thought to represent the coast between present-day Hamelin Bay and Point D'Entrecasteaux. Portions of this coastline are labelled Duynich landt boven met boomen ende boseage ("Dunes with trees and underwood at top"), Laegh ghelijck verdroncken landt ("Low land seemingly submerged") and Laegh duynich landt ("Low land with dunes").

== Australian reference to the ship ==
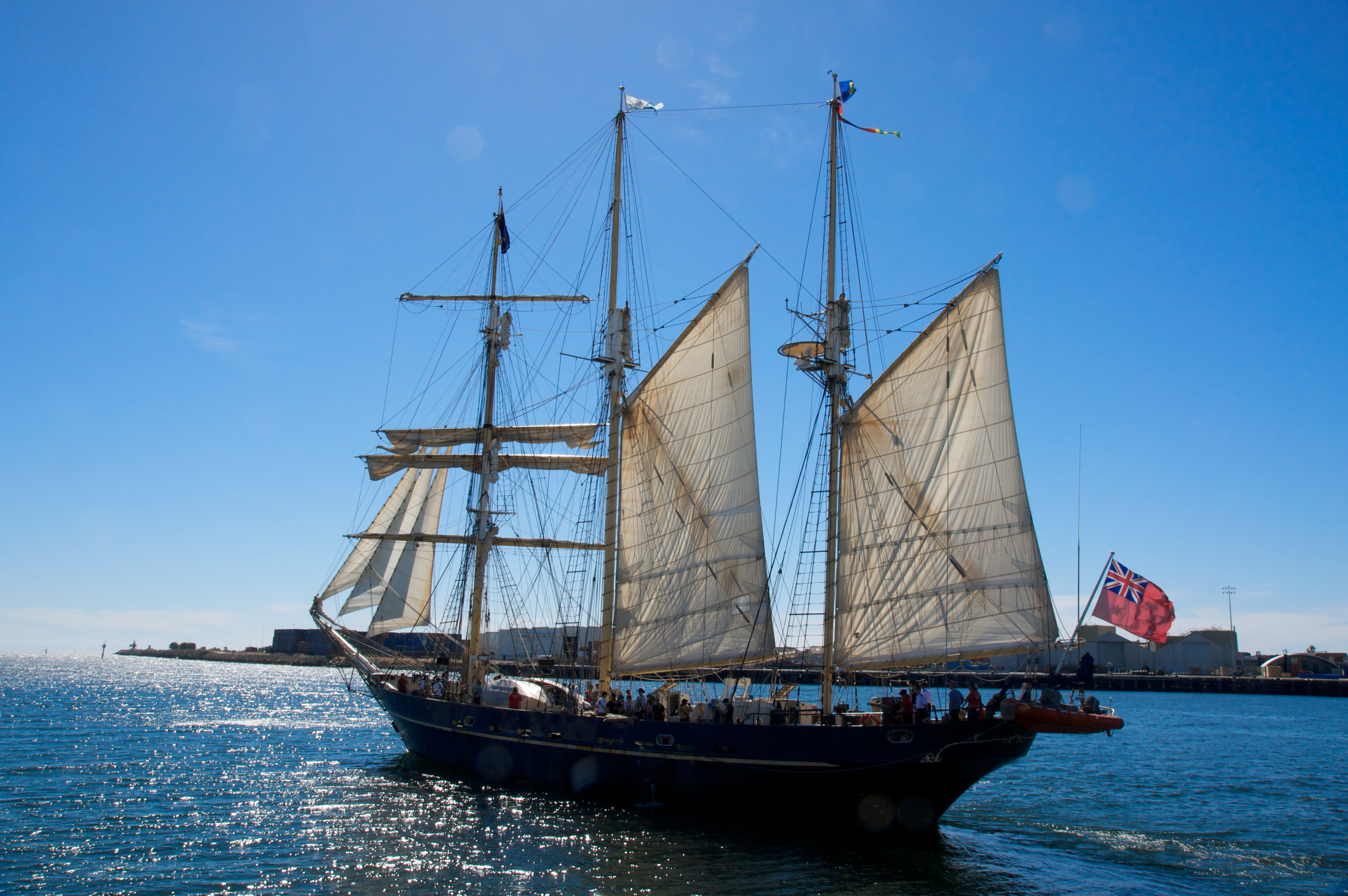
STS Leeuwin II in Fremantle Harbour in 2009

The south-west corner of Australia was subsequently referred to by the Dutch as 't Landt van de Leeuwin ("The Land of the Leeuwin") for a time, subsequently shortened to "Leeuwin's Land" by the English. This name Leeuwin still survives in the name of Cape Leeuwin, the most south-westerly point of the Australian mainland, so named by Matthew Flinders in December 1801.

The sail training ship STS Leeuwin II, based in Fremantle, Western Australia, is named in honour of Leeuwin, although the "II" refers not to the original Leeuwin but to a yacht that was already entered in Australia's ship's register under the name.

The coastal current that flows southward along the Western Australian coast is named "the Leeuwin Current". It is unusual for a coastal current to flow away from the equator. The current, like most ocean currents, spawns eddies that have implications for ocean circulation as well as regional biological productivity.
