= Ashburton River (Western Australia) =

River in Western Australia

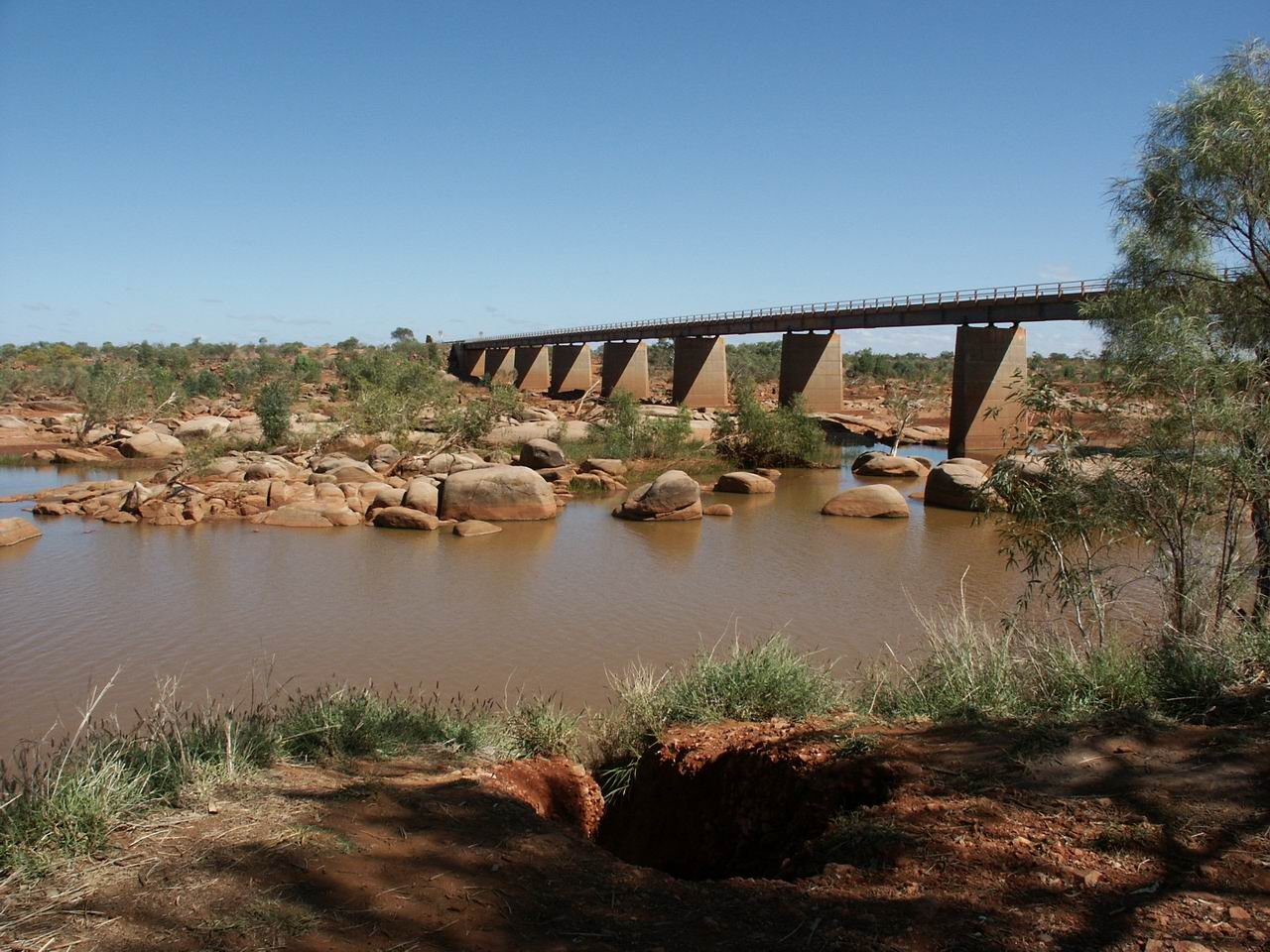
- Ashburton River at Nanutarra

- Location of river mouth in Australia

Location
- Country: Australia

Physical characteristics
- Source
  - location: Pilbara region
  - coordinates: 21°41′25″S 114°54′53″E
  - elevation: 571 m (1,873 ft)
- Mouth
  - location: Indian Ocean 20 km (12 mi) SW of Onslow
  - coordinates: 21.73760°S 114.93941°E
- Length: 680 km (423 mi)
- Basin size: 66,850 km^{2} (25,811 sq mi)

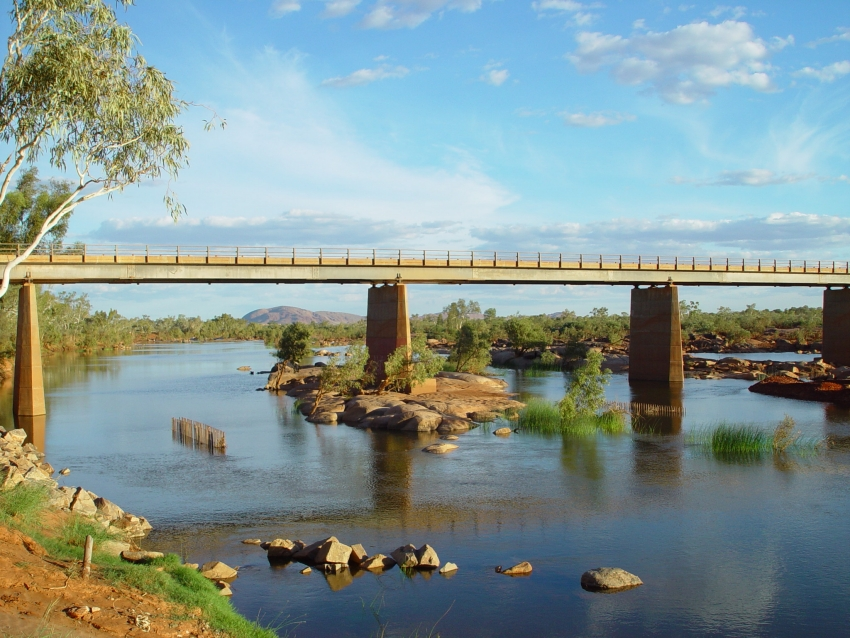
Ashburton River near Nanutarra roadhouse

The Ashburton River is located within the Pilbara region of Western Australia.

== Geography ==
The river rises approximately 100 kilometres (62 mi) south of Newman and flows in a west-north-westerly direction until discharging into the Indian Ocean approximately 20 kilometres (12 mi) south west of Onslow. The North West Coastal Highway crosses the river at Nanutarra. The river has a length of approximately 680 kilometres (420 mi). The river basin covers an area of 66,850 square kilometres (25,810 sq mi) and includes the towns of Paraburdoo and Tom Price.

== Tributaries ==
Some of the larger tributaries of the Ashburton river are Beasley River, Henry River, Hardey River and Ethel river. Smaller tributaries include Duck Creek, Turee Creek, Tunnel Creek, Angelo River, Stockyard Creek, Gorge Creek, Goldfields Creek, Peepingee Creek and Jubricoo Creek.

== History ==
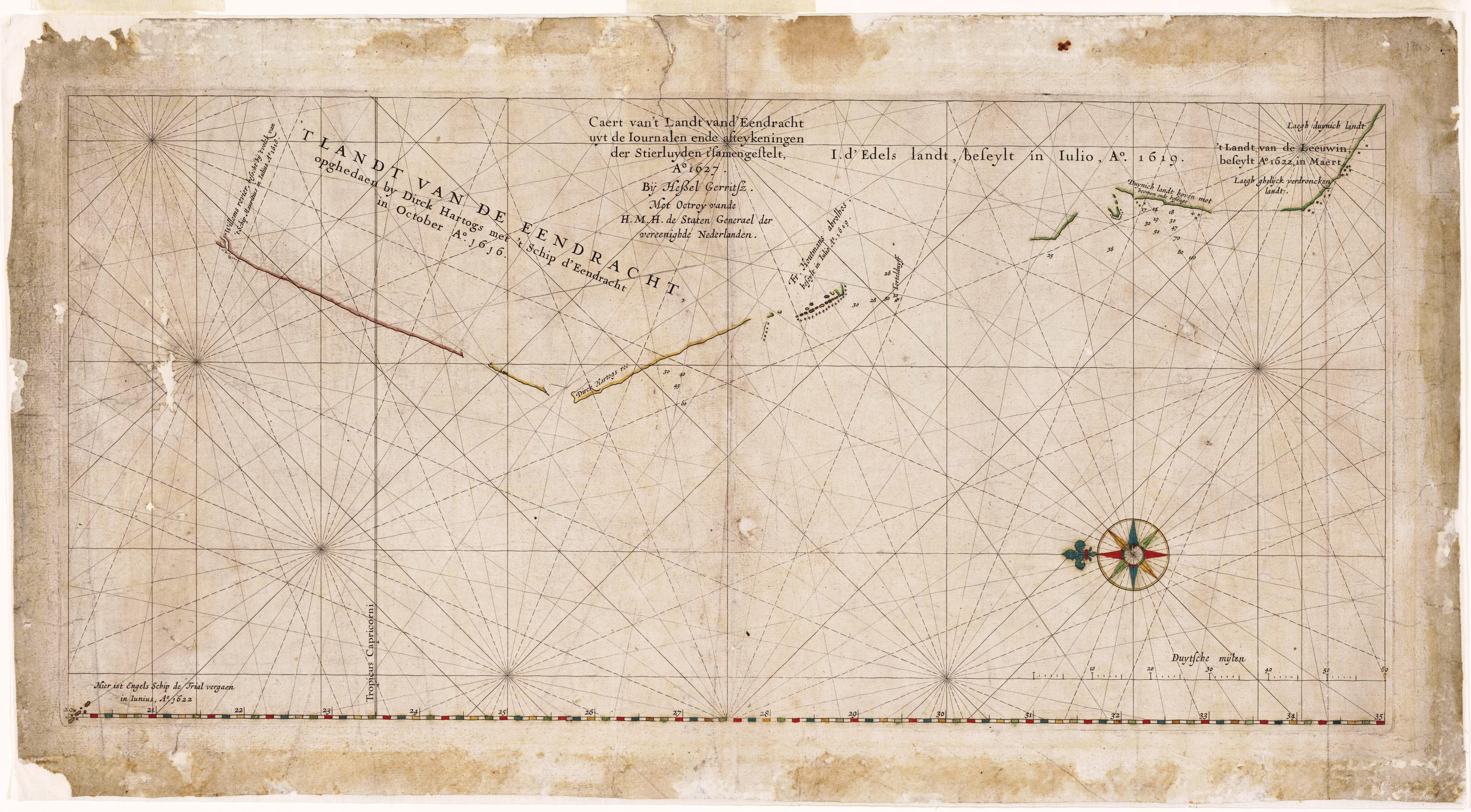
Caert van't Landt van d'Eendracht

The Ashburton River is on the land of the Thalanyji people, the Aboriginal, traditional owners of the land and is known to them as “Minduruu”. The Thalanyji people believe the serpent Warnamankura lives in the river. The river is later believed to have been named Willem's River during the voyage of the Dutch East India Company ship Mauritius in 1618, under command of Supercargo Willem Janszoon, and captained by Lenaert Jacobszoon. It was one of the few features named on a nautical chart made in 1627. This area was first visited by Europeans in 1618, when the crew of the ship Mauritius encountered the Western Australian coastline, and mapped a river they named Willem's River.

Janszoon was the captain of the Duyfken in 1605–1606, when part of the Gulf of Carpentaria was mapped, during the earliest documented visit to Australia by a vessel from Europe.

Caert van't Landt van d'Eendracht ("Chart of the Land of Eendracht") is a 1627 chart made by Hessel Gerritsz and is one of the earliest charts showing the coastline of Western Australia. The Willem River is located to the extreme left (north) end of the coastline on the chart.

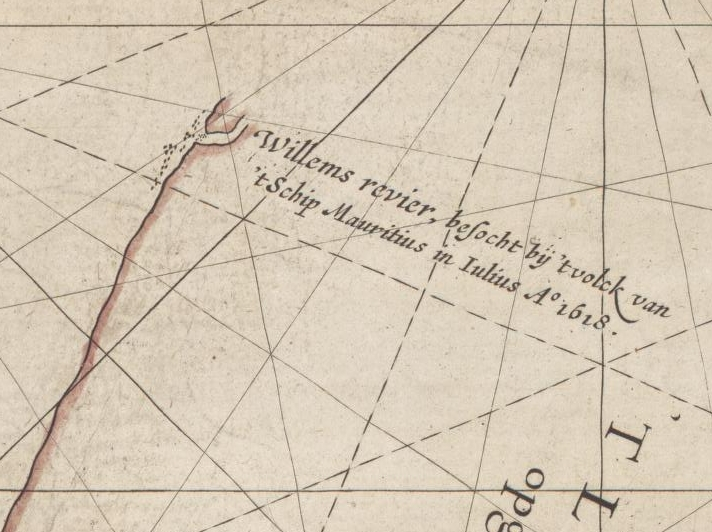
Caert van't Landt van d'Eendracht, enlarged detail showing Willem River by Hessel Gerritsz, (reoriented with north to top).

The chart shows Willems revier, besocht by 't volck van 't Schip Mauritius in Iulius A° 1618 ("Willem's River, visited by the crew of the ship Mauritius in July 1618").

The detail of the river's position on the chart backs up the claim that this is the Ashburton River, which, being at 21 degrees 40 minutes south and 114 degrees 56 east, is almost exactly the latitude as shown on the chart, and given by Hessel Gerritsz as 21 degrees 45 minutes south latitude. The chart is oriented with north to the left, showing lines of latitude from 20th parallel south to the 35th parallel south at the base of the map. The lines of latitude appear to be very accurate, matching known features through the length of the chart.

Other factors to back up that this is the Ashburton River is that it takes almost a 90 degree turn north-east, once in the mouth, as shown on the chart, and the northern headland of the river mouth matches closely the shape of the headland as shown on the chart.

The township of Onslow was located at the mouth of the Ashburton River where a jetty was used as the town's and region's port, but once the new deep water port facility was completed at Beadon point 15 kilometres (9.3 mi) north of the old townsite, the townsite was moved.

== Fauna ==
The river supports a wide variety of fish including barramundi and mangrove jack. The occasional salt water crocodile is also spotted in the river. Bird species such as black swans, the striated heron, Australian bustard and bush stone-curlew can be found along the river's banks.
