= Eendracht (1615) =

Dutch East India Company ship

History
- Name: Eendracht
- Owner: Dutch East India Company
- Builder: Amsterdam Dockyard
- Launched: 1615
- Maiden voyage: 23 January 1616
- Home port: Texel
- Fate: Wrecked and lost, 1622

General characteristics
- Type: East Indiaman
- Tons burthen: 700 tons bm
- Complement: ~200
- Armament: 32 guns

Service record
- Commanders: Dirk Hartog

Eendracht (Dutch pronunciation: [ˈeːndrɑxt]; Concord) was an early-17th-century Dutch wooden-hulled 700-ton-burthen East Indiaman, launched in 1615 in the service of the Dutch East India Company (commonly abbreviated as VOC). Its Dutch name means 'concord', 'unity' or 'union', and was a common name given to Dutch ships of the period, from the motto of the republic: Concordia res parvae crescunt (Eendracht maakt macht, lit. 'Unity makes strength'). The ship was captained by Dirk Hartog when he made the second recorded landfall by a European on Australian soil, in 1616.

== First voyage to the East Indies ==
=== Departure from Holland ===
Upon its commissioning, Eendracht entered the service of the VOC. For her maiden voyage on the open ocean, Eendracht set sail on 23 January 1616 from the Dutch port of Texel in the company of several other VOC ships, on a trading venture bound for Batavia (the present-day Jakarta) in the Dutch East Indies. Her captain was Dirk Hartog, a thirty-five-year-old former private merchant, who had sailed for the VOC before but was now again in the employ of the VOC.

=== Route to Indian Ocean ===
Sailing down the west Africa coastline, Eendracht became separated from the others in a severe storm and reached the Cape of Good Hope alone around August. She stayed there until 27 August when Hartog decided to set out unaccompanied across the Indian Ocean towards their destination.

Hartog's course across the Indian Ocean was a much more southerly one than the route usually followed. It made use of the prevailing westerly winds at those latitudes known as the Roaring Forties, a route which had been pioneered a few years earlier by the Dutch navigator Hendrik Brouwer who had noted it to be a faster way to reach Java. By this time, the VOC had not as yet instructed all its captains to take advantage of this route, which could reduce the overall travelling time from Europe by a good six months. The decision to do so was taken just a few months after Hartog departed Amsterdam. So Hartog took that decision himself. However, later the intention was to change heading northwards at a more westerly longitude than Eendracht had done. Whether Hartog had intended to maintain such a southerly course for so long via this route, or was perhaps blown a little off course, is unclear.

=== Landfall in Australia ===
After approximately two months at sea, on 25 October Hartog and Eendracht unexpectedly sighted land—"various islands, which were, however, found uninhabited", at a latitude around 26° South. These islands and the nearby land were previously unknown to Europeans, and Eendracht had become the second-recorded European ship to visit the continent of Australia, having been preceded (albeit, on the opposite side of the continent) ten years earlier by Willem Janszoon on Duyfken sailing along, and landing on, the western shores of the Cape York Peninsula just months before Luís Vaz de Torres sailed through the straight that now bears his name without leaving records of seeing land at his south.

Hartog and crew made landfall on the island, now known as Dirk Hartog Island which lies off Shark Bay in Western Australia. This was the first recorded landing on the western coastline by Europeans. The island was uninhabited, and Hartog spent three days there, finding nothing of great interest or value to him or his company.

Before departing on 27 October, Hartog left behind a pewter dish, now known as the Hartog Plate, affixed to a post set in a rock cleft (now called Cape Inscription). Upon the plate he had inscribed the following brief account of his visit:

1616 On 25 October arrived the ship Eendracht, of Amsterdam: Supercargo Gilles Miebais of Liege, skipper Dirch Hatichs of Amsterdam. on 27 d[itt]o. she set sail again for Bantam. Deputy supercargo Jan Stins, upper steersman Pieter Doores of Bil. In the year 1616.

The Hartog Plate, measuring 36.5 centimetres (14.4 in) in diameter, is the oldest-known written artifact from Australia's European history. It lay unmolested in situ for a further eighty years, until it was re-discovered half-buried (the post had rotted away) by a Dutch expedition of three ships under the command of the Flemish captain Willem de Vlamingh in 1697. De Vlamingh had earlier explored Rottnest Island and the Swan River (later to be the site of the city of Perth), and had been making his way up the western coast of Australia. He replaced the Hartog dish with one of his own, onto which he copied Hartog's original inscription and added an account of his own landing, installing it in the same spot nailed to a cypress-pine trunk taken from Rottnest Island. Hartog's original dish returned with De Vlamingh later to Amsterdam, where it is displayed in the Rijksmuseum.

=== Charting the coast of Western Australia ===
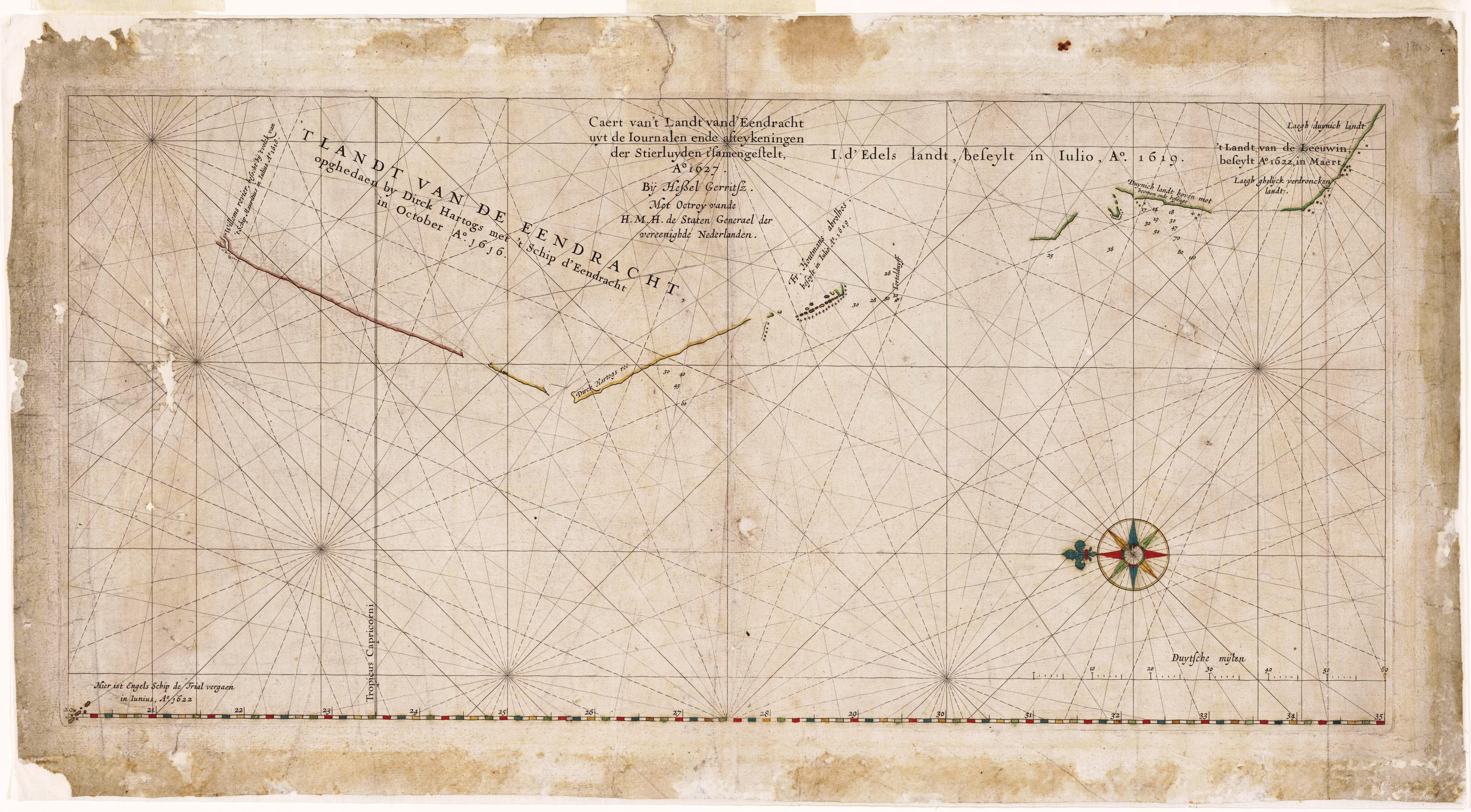
Caert van't Landt van d'Eendracht is oriented with north to the left and shows the degrees of latitude on the bottom of the chart.

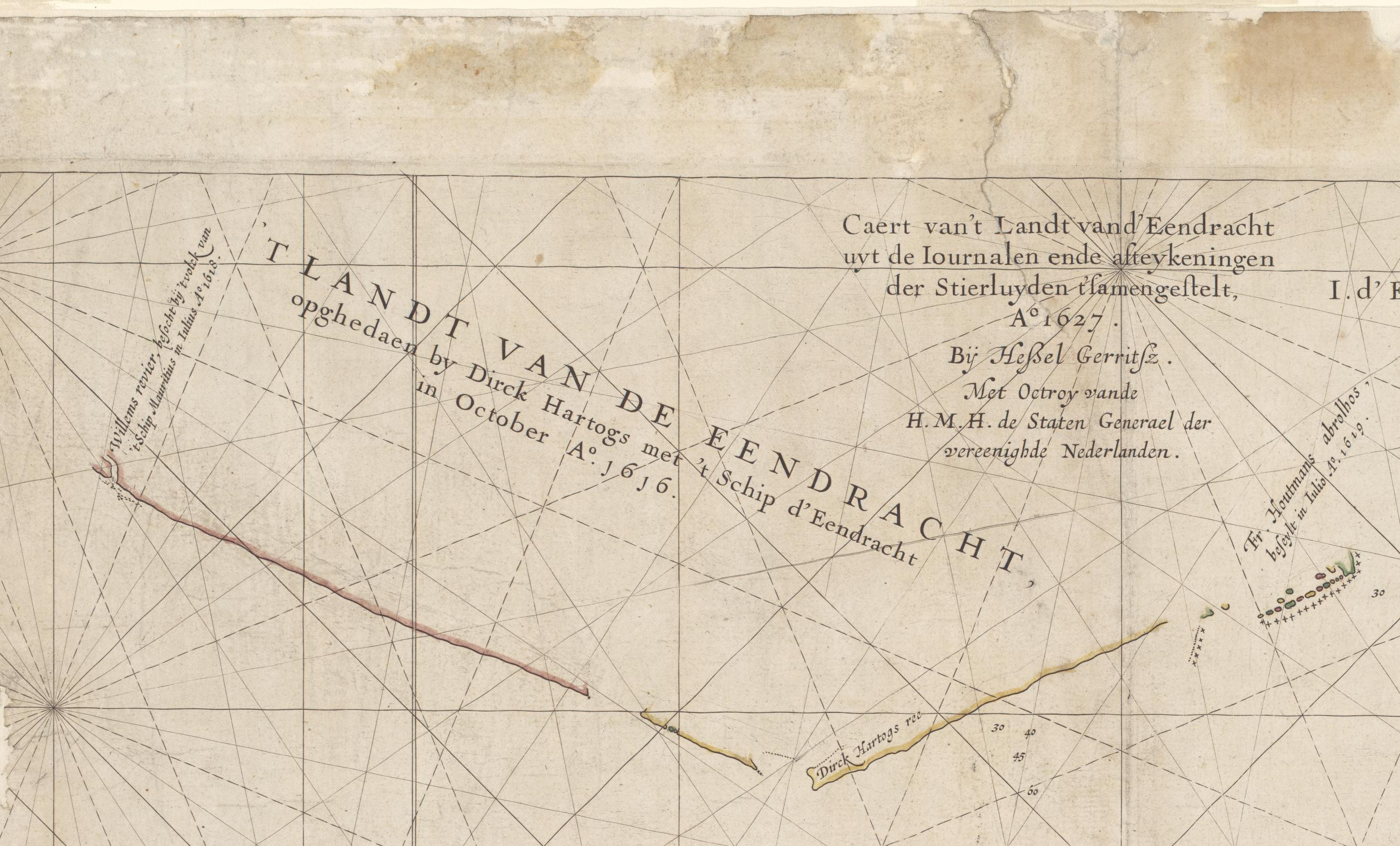
Caert van't Landt van d'Eendracht (detail showing Eendrachtsland) – Text on the close-up crop from the main chart reads, T Landt van de Eendracht, opghedaen by Dirck Hartogs met 't Schip d'Eendracht in October A° 1616 (transl. The Land of Eendracht, discovered by Dirk Hartog of the Eendracht in October 1616).

After leaving the island, Eendracht sailed in a north-east direction along the Western Australian coastline, Hartog charting as he went. He gave this land the name t'Landt van d'Eendracht (transl. Eendrachtsland), after his ship.

In 1627 this name appeared on the Caert van't Landt van d'Eendracht and on subsequent charts, replacing the former mythical and postulated land of Terra Australis Incognita (transl. South Land), sparking considerable further interest by parties such as the VOC. This gave further impetus to explore this region in the hope of something notable or exploitable, leading to a long period of further exploration. Hartog's name Eendrachtsland was at first being retained for just the part he visited, when the continent he was then thought to have visited was named Nova Hollandia (lit. 'New Holland') by Abel Tasman in 1644 when further unveiled by him on two expeditions during the previous two years.

Hartog himself did not note anything which might be of use, making no further landfalls or contact with Aboriginal Australians inhabiting the land. Eendracht continued along the coast to about 22° South latitude, thereafter heading northwards toward the Timor Sea. She arrived first at Makassar on the island of Sulawesi on 14 December 1616 where a conflict with the local chief caused the ship to leave for Ambon where it arrived six days later. Some excerpts of a letter from Supercargo, Cornelis Buysero at Bantam to the managers of the VOC at Amsterdam, with comments from author, Jan Heeres in 1899, is of interest to the history of Eendracht, as follows.

Worshipful, Wise, Provident, very Discreet Gentlemen,...

...The ship Eendracht [*], with which they had sailed from the Netherlands, after communicating at the Cabo sailed away from them so far southward as to come upon 6 various islands which were, however, found uninhabited [**]...

[* Commanded by Dirk Hartogs, or Hartogszoon.]

[* What "uninhabited islands" the ship Eendracht "came upon", Buysero's letter does not say. Various authentic archival documents of 1618 and subsequent years, however, go to show that the land afterwards named Eendrachtsland or Land van de Eendracht, and the Dirk Hartogsreede (island) must have been discovered on this voyage.]

Bantam, this last day of August, A.D. 1617.
Your Worships' servant to command
CORNELIS BUYSERO [*]

[* Buysero was supercargo at Bantam (DE JONGE, Opkcornst, IV, p. 68,) and was therefore likely to be well informed as to the adventures of the ship, which had sailed from the Netherlands in January 1616, departed from the Cape of Good Hope in the last days of August, and had arrived in India in December of the same year, as appears from what Steven Van der Haghen, Governor of Amboyna, writes May 26, 1617: "That in the month of December 1616, the ship Eendracht entered the narrows between Bima and the land of Endea near Guno Api (Goenoeng Api) in the south of Java" (Sapi Straits).]

It proves that as early as 1618 the name of Eendrachtsland was known in the Netherlands.

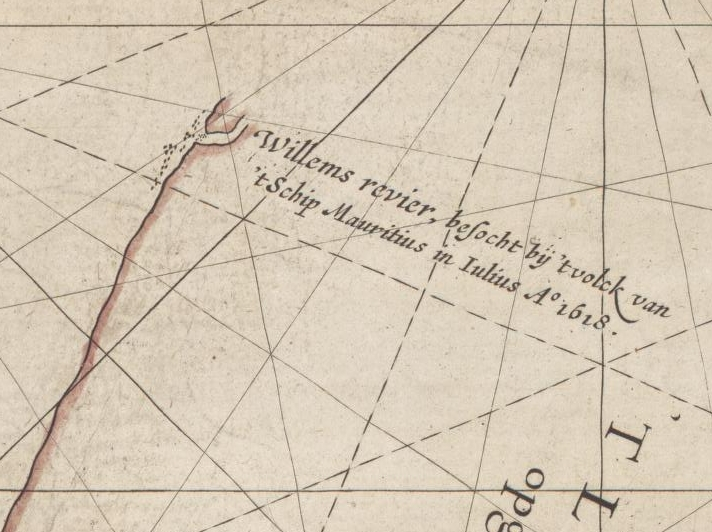
Caert van't Landt van d'Eendracht (detail naming the Mauritius as ship used for the discovery of the Willems River) by Hessel Gerritsz, stating, Willems revier, besocht by 't volck van 't Schip Mauritius in Iulius A° 1618 ("Willem's River, visited by the crew of the ship Mauritius in July 1618"). [This cropped image has been reoriented 90 degrees right from the original chart with north to top.]

The Willems River discovery added to the boundary of Eendrachtsland in 1618, as shown by the prominence given to Eendrachtsland as the main name on the chart as the name for this South-land. It names the Mauritius as the ship used for the discovery of the Willems River. The text on this close-up cropped image says, Willems revier, besocht by 't volck van 't Schip Mauritius in Iulius A° 1618 (transl. Willem's River, visited by the crew of the ship Mauritius in July 1618).

== Return voyage to the Netherlands ==
Eendracht remained in the East Indies for about a year, possibly engaging in local commercial ventures.

On 17 December 1617 she again set sail for the return voyage home, leaving the port of Bantam and bound for Zeeland in the Dutch Republic, with Dirk Hartog again as her master. This voyage proved to be relatively uneventful, and she arrived back in the Netherlands on 16 October 1618 after a period of some ten months at sea. Captain Hartog left the service of the VOC shortly after the return, to resume private trading ventures in the Baltic. He died a few years later.

== Second voyage to the East Indies ==
On 13 May 1619 Eendracht again left port at Texel, bound a second time for Batavia and the East Indies. She rounded the Cape of Good Hope on 26 November, and reached her destination on 22 March 1620 without recorded incident, a journey of some ten months.

== Shipwreck ==
She apparently remained in the East Indies, until 13 May 1622, where on a local trading voyage she is recorded as having been wrecked and lost off the western coast of Ambon Island in the central Moluccas. She had aboard a cargo of coins, and her wreck has not been recovered.
