= Turtledove =

Turtledove or turtle dove may refer to:

== Fauna ==
- Various bird species, especially of the genus Streptopelia in the family Columbidae (doves and pigeons):
  - European turtle dove (Streptopelia turtur)
  - Oriental turtle dove (Streptopelia orientalis)
  - Dusky turtle dove (Streptopelia lugens)
  - Adamawa turtle dove (Streptopelia hypopyrrha)
  - Mourning dove (Zenaida macroura)

== People ==
- Harry Turtledove (born 1949), historian and author who writes historical fiction, science fiction, and fantasy novels

== Places ==
- Turtle Dove Shoal, a rocky shoal in the Indian Ocean
- Turtledove Cay, United States Virgin Islands, a small islet, located 100 yards north of Saba Island in the United States Virgin Islands

== Business ==
- Adidas Yeezy 350 Turtle Dove, a type of shoe in the Adidas Yeezy range
- Turtledove Clemens, a marketing communications agency in Portland, Oregon, USA

== Literature and film ==
- The turtle-dove's necklace, an 11th-century Arabic book by Ibn Hazm (also called The Ring of the Dove)
- "The Turtle Dove", an 18th-century English folk ballad (also called "Fare Thee Well")
- Turtledove General Delivery (Postlagernd Turteltaube), a 1952 West German comedy film
