= Hardey River =

River in Western Australia

Coordinates: 22°43′59″S 116°7′7″E

Location
- Country: Australia

Physical characteristics
- Source
  - location: Tom Price, Western Australia
  - elevation: 724 metres (2,375 ft)
- Mouth
  - location: Ashburton River
  - elevation: 140 metres (459 ft)
- Length: 217 km (135 mi)

The Hardey River is a river in the Pilbara region of Western Australia.

The headwaters of the river rise at Tom Price in the Hamersley Range and flow in a westerly direction. The river travels almost parallel with the Nanutarra-Wittenoom Road until it discharges into the Ashburton River near Hardey Junction.

The Hardey River has two tributaries, the Beasley River and Hope Creek.

The river was named in 1861 during an expedition by explorer Francis Gregory, after Swan River colonist John Wall Hardey, who was a family friend. Gregory had previously named the nearby Mount Wall after Hardey.
