= Turtle Dove Shoal =

Shoal off the coast of Western Australia

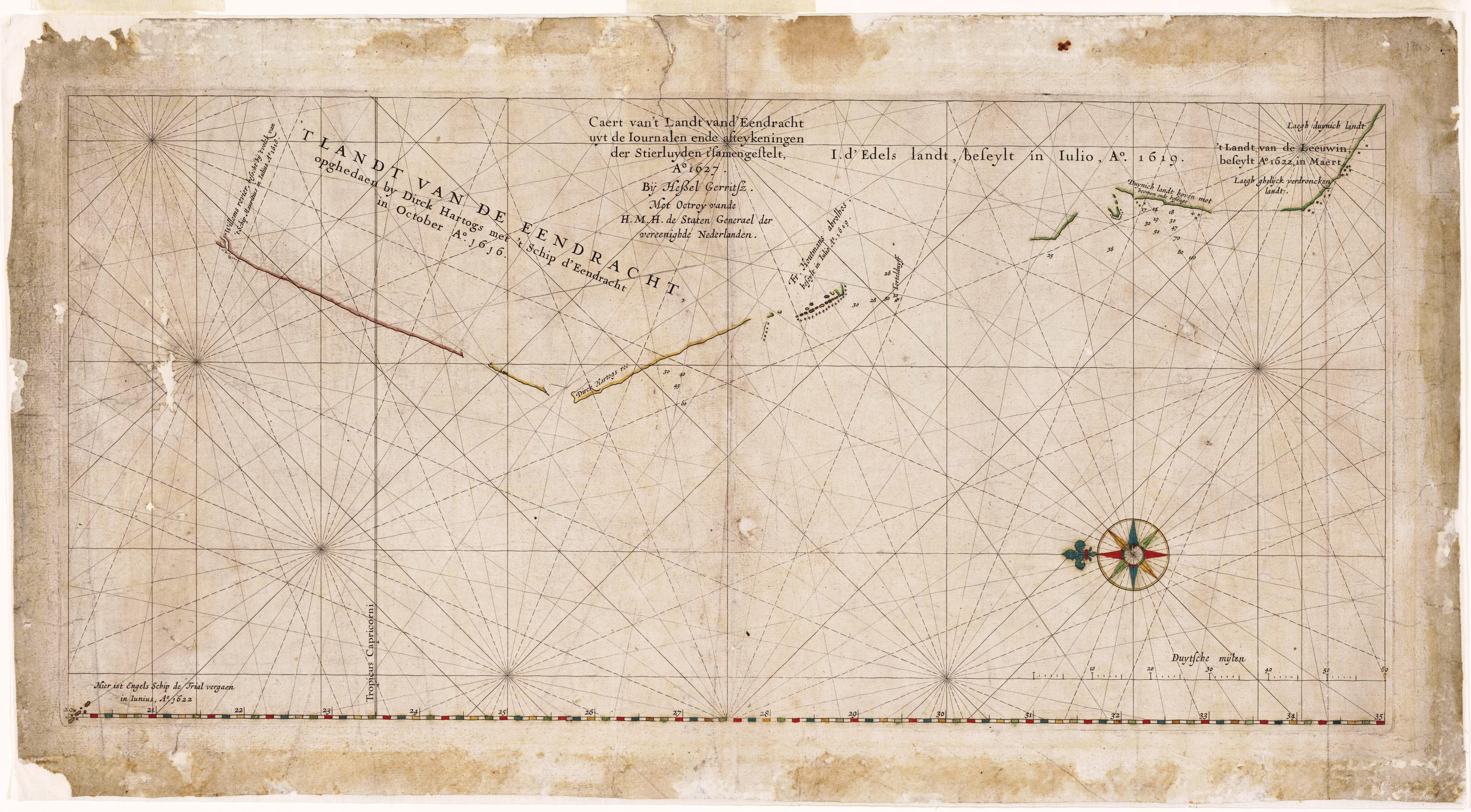
Hessel Gerritszoon's 1627 "Caert van't Landt van d'Eendracht", the first map to show the Turtle Dove Shoal

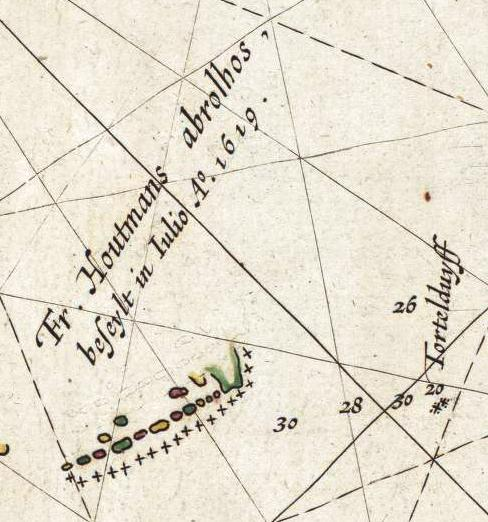
Detail of "Caert van t'Land van d'Eendracht", showing features labelled "Fr. Houtman's abrolhos" and "Tortelduyff".

Turtle Dove Shoal is a dangerous shoal about 3 kilometres (1.9 mi) wide, located at 29°25′S 114°12′E, in the Indian Ocean about 50 kilometres (31 mi) south of the Houtman Abrolhos, off the coast of Western Australia.

The shoal was first charted on a 1627 map by Hessel Gerritsz, where it was labelled as the "Tortelduyff" rocks. The name is thought to signify that the shoal was first discovered by the ship Tortelduif, which is recorded as having arrived at Batavia, Dutch East Indies on 21 June 1623. It was originally laid down in latitude 29° 11' S, and as a result later voyages failed to locate it. In his 1825 Narrative of a survey of the intertropical and western coasts of Australia, Phillip Parker King suggested that they were merely the southernmost reef of the Houtman Abrolhos. In 1846, John Lort Stokes took the same position:

[A]t noon we were in lat. 29° 11' S., on the position assigned to a reef called the Turtle Dove. From the masthead I could see nothing indicating a shoal. Captain King passed near this position, and also remarks not seeing it. The Colonial schooner Champion, in beating to the southward, has passed over and near its assigned position, and I think we may fairly infer that there is no such reef as the Turtle Dove, and that probably it originated from the south end of the Abrolhos reef, ten miles N.N.W. of it, being seen.

Turtle Dove Shoal is featured in the 2012 movie Storm Surfers 3D about big wave surfing with Ross Clarke-Jones and Tom Carroll (surfer).
