= Dirk Hartog Island =

Island on coast of Gascoyne region of Western Australia

Dirk Hartog Island National Park
Wirruwana
- Location within Western Australia
- Dirk Hartog Island (●)

Geography
- Location: Indian Ocean
- Coordinates: 25°48′S 113°03′E
- Area: 620 km^{2} (240 sq mi)
- Length: 80 km (50 mi)
- Width: 15 km (9.3 mi)
- Highest elevation: 188 m (617 ft)
- Highest point: Herald Heights

Administration
- Australia
- State: Western Australia
- Region: Gascoyne
- Shire: Shire of Shark Bay

Demographics
- Population: 9 (SAL 2021)

A map of the Shark Bay region

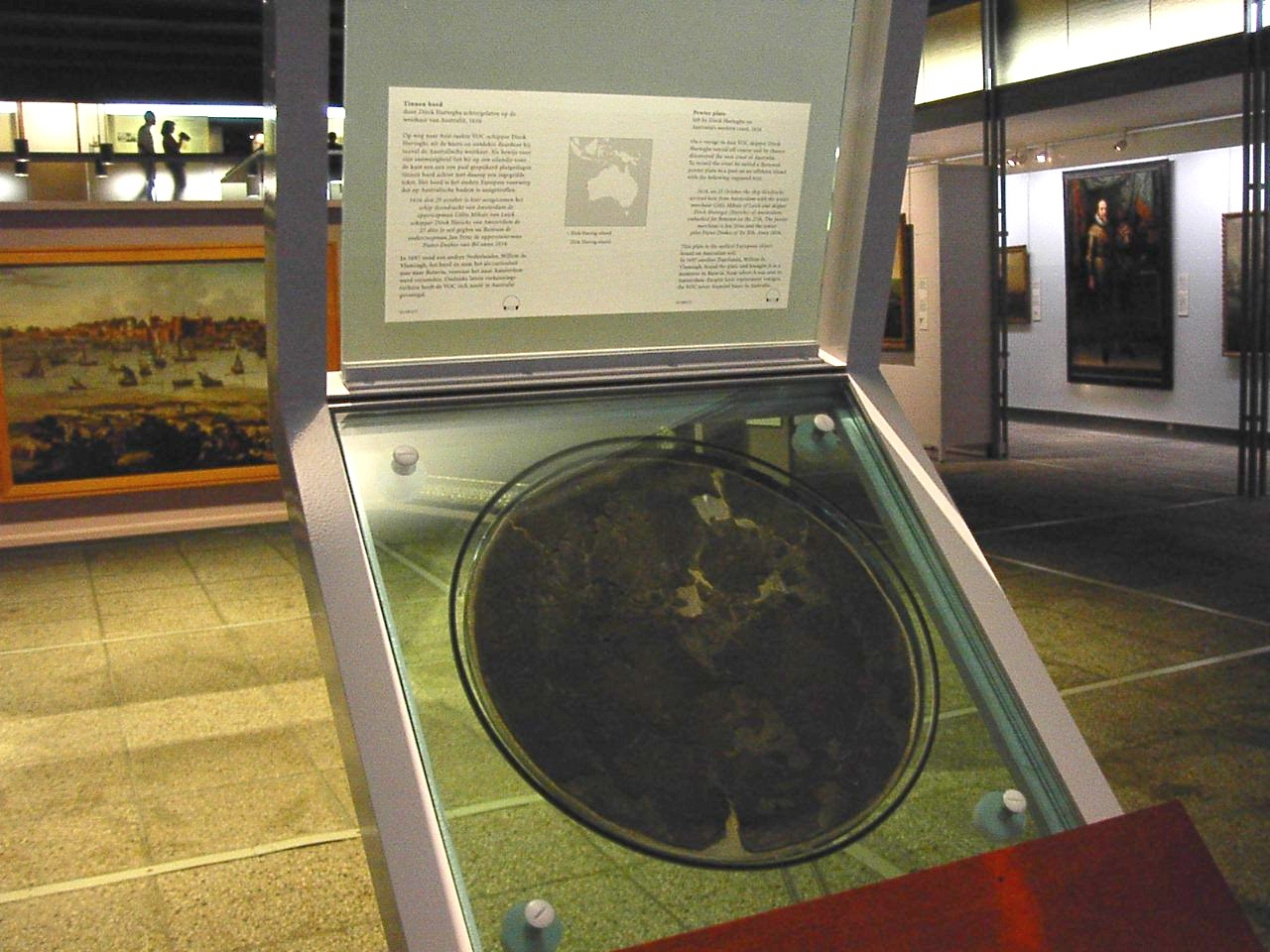
A copy of Dirk Hartog's plate in the Rijksmuseum, Amsterdam

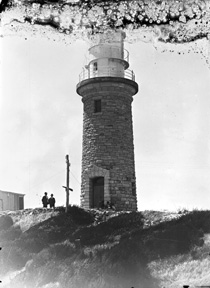
Cape Inscription lighthouse, c. 1910

Dirk Hartog Island is an island off the Gascoyne coast of Western Australia, within the Shark Bay World Heritage Area. It is about 80 kilometres (50 miles) long and between 3 and 15 kilometres (2 and 9 miles) wide and is Western Australia's largest and westernmost island. It covers an area of 620 square kilometres (240 square miles) and is approximately 850 kilometres (530 miles) north of Perth.

Known as Wirruwana by the traditional custodians of the island, the Malgana people, the island is named after Dirk Hartog, a Dutch sea captain, whose ship first encountered the Western Australian coastline in 1616, close to the 26th parallel south latitude, which runs through the island. After leaving the island, Hartog continued his voyage north-east along the coast, giving the Australian mainland one of its earliest known names, Eendrachtsland, which he named after his ship Eendracht, meaning "concord".

The island is now the site of a major environmental reconstruction project, Return to 1616, that has seen all introduced livestock and feral animals removed, and eleven native species in various stages of reintroduction.

== History ==
The first Europeans known to have sighted the island were the crew of the Dutch East India Company (VOC) ship Eendracht, captained by Hartog, on 25 October 1616, during a voyage from Cape Town to Batavia. The date, and the names of the senior people on the vessel, were inscribed on a pewter plate and nailed to a post.

In 1697, Dutch captain Willem de Vlamingh landed on the island and found the Hartog Plate. He replaced it with one of his own, which included a copy of Hartog's inscription, and took the original plate home to Amsterdam, where it is still kept in the Rijksmuseum Amsterdam.

On 28 March 1772, French navigator Louis Aleno de Saint-Aloüarn landed on the island and became the first European to formally take possession of Western Australia in the name of the French king Louis XV. That involved a ceremony on 30 March, during which one or more bottles were buried on the island. One bottle was recorded as containing an annexation document and a coin. In 1998 a bottle cap made of lead with an écu coin set in it was found at Turtle Bay by a team led by Philippe Godard and Max Cramer. That triggered a broader search by a team from the Western Australian Museum, led by Myra Stanbury, with Bob Sheppard, Bob Creasy and Dr Michael McCarthy. In April 1998, an intact bottle was unearthed, with a lead cap identical to the one recovered earlier, and also with a coin set in it. No trace of an annexation document has yet been found.

In 1801, the island was visited by the Naturaliste, under French Navy officer and explorer Emmanuel Hamelin, which was part of the Baudin expedition to Australia. They found de Vlamingh's plate almost buried in the sand, its post having rotted away. Hamelin ordered that it be re-erected in its original position. In 1818, the Uranie, captained by French explorer Louis de Freycinet, who had been an officer in Hamelin's 1801 crew, sent a boat ashore to recover de Vlamingh's plate. It eventually arrived in Paris, only to be lost for over a century. It was found in 1940 and returned to Australia in 1947, where it can now be seen at the WA Maritime Museum in Fremantle.

In 1869, Francis Louis von Bibra (son of Franz Ludwig von Bibra) was granted a lease to the island. Von Bibra grazed sheep there and traded guano from its bays.

In 1907, the leasehold on the island was acquired from Messrs Moore and Meade by the Withnell brothers. It was regarded as an ideal place for a sheep station as there was no danger of rabbit invasion. In 1909, it was carrying a flock of about 12,000 sheep and produced approximately 400 bales of wool. The property was then owned by John and James Withnell, the children of John and Emma Withnell who had been early settlers in the Pilbara. The brothers estimated the area of the island to be 156,000 acres (631 km^{2}) and intended to increase the flock on the island to 25,000. In 1910, the flock size was 14,200.

In 1919, the pastoral lease was put up for auction by the owner James Nicholas, who also owned Croydon and Peron Peninsula Stations. The station occupied an area of 153,000 acres (61,917 ha) and was stocked with approximately 19,000 sheep.

Thomas Wardle, the Lord Mayor of Perth, purchased the island as a private retreat for his family in about 1969 and later retired there, becoming a semi-recluse with his wife. With the exception of the pastoral homestead, the island later returned to government ownership and became part of the Shark Bay Marine Park. The homestead is now run as an eco-tourism resort and maintained by Wardle's grandson, Kieran Wardle.

In March 2008, Australian Prime Minister Kevin Rudd announced that the wreck of the World War II German raider Kormoran had been found on the seabed about 150 kilometres (93 miles) west of the island.

== Geography ==
The northerly most point Cape Inscription is the location of the plates and the main lighthouse.

The bay facing north next to Cape Inscription 25°28′S 112°58′E is known as Turtle Bay.

The most south westerly point – Surf Point 26°07′26″S 113°10′46″E – is located at the channel known as South Passage 26°07′55″S 113°09′31″E across from Steep Point on its south west side.

=== Land use ===
The island is mostly scrub-covered sand dunes. At times it has been used as a sheep station and supported 20,000 head of sheep at one stage. The island is now Dirk Hartog Island National Park and sheep have been removed. To the east it is bounded by the Shark Bay Marine Park, and it is part of Shark Bay World Heritage Area. A small area is leased to the Wardle family who runs it as a tourism destination. The region is widely used for recreational fishing.

== Wildlife and conservation ==
Dirk Hartog Island is an important nesting site for loggerhead sea turtle, with green turtles and loggerhead turtles both nesting on the beaches. It is also home for the endemic subspecies of the white-winged fairy-wren. Quoin Bluff, mid-way along the eastern side of the island, holds an important pied cormorant nesting colony which, along with Freycinet Island some 80 km (50 mi) to the south-east, forms the Quoin Bluff and Freycinet Island Important Bird Area, identified as such by BirdLife International.

In October 2018, at the end of a 20-year project, the island was declared free of feral cats, goats and sheep, paving the way for the reintroduction of 11 native animals, most of which had disappeared following a century and a half of pastoral activity and predation.

The "Return to 1616" environmental reconstruction project originally included the planned return of nine native species confirmed to have once been present on the island: the western barred bandicoot, burrowing bettong, Shark Bay mouse, greater stick-nest rat, western thick-billed grasswren, brush-trailed bettong, heath mouse, desert mouse, brush-tailed mulgara, dibbler and chuditch. Two additional mammal species that are thought likely to have once been present on the island, the rufous hare-wallaby and banded hare-wallaby, were included in the faunal reconstruction, and were the first to be returned following the eradication of feral cats in September 2017.

The western barred bandicoot and the dibbler were returned in October 2019.

The Shark Bay mouse and the greater stick-nest rat were reintroduced to the island in April and May 2021, respectively, with early monitoring suggesting ongoing survival. The island is modelled to have a potential carrying capacity of approximately 10,000 greater stick-nest rats, which if reached, would be by far the largest extant population of the species.

The western thick-billed grasswren was returned in October 2022, with 85 birds translocated to the island from two distinct mainland populations at Shark Bay.

Proof that dibblers were reproducing on the island was established in June 2021. By November 2022, all six reintroduced mammal species were described as breeding and establishing new territories on the island.

One hundred brush-tailed mulgaras were reintroduced to the island from Matuwa Kurrara Kurrara National Park in the Western Australian Goldfields, in June 2023. The population is hoped to expand to 3,000.

Brush-tailed bettongs were reintroduced to the island in April 2025, with 180 animals sourced from Dryandra Woodland, Kingston National Park, and Tone-Perup Nature Reserve. Unusually hot and dry conditions in the weeks following the species' release led to unexpectedly high mortality - 50 per cent among monitored individuals - but by October of that year surviving animals were noted to be breeding and showing signs of establishment.

Plans to reintroduce the heath mouse and desert mouse were formally abandoned in 2025, due to the scarcity of source populations.

== See also ==
- Caert van't Landt van d'Eendracht, an early Dutch map of the region
- Meade Island is linked to Dirk Hartog Island at low tide
- French Western Australia
