= Beasley River =

River in Western Australia

Coordinates: 22°59′25″S 116°53′8″E

Location
- Country: Australia

Physical characteristics
- Source
  - location: Hamersley Range
  - elevation: 600 metres (1,969 ft)
- Mouth
  - location: Hardey River
  - elevation: 254 metres (833 ft)
- Length: 105 km (65 mi)

The Beasley River is a river in the Pilbara region of Western Australia.

The headwaters of the river rise in the Hamersley Range approximately 40 kilometres (25 mi) north-west of Tom Price and flows in a south-westerly direction through Woongarra Pool before discharging into the Hardey River.

The only tributary of the river is Beasley River West.

The river was named in 1962 after government surveyor Thomas Beasley, who first recorded it during an expedition in 1885. Previously the river had been known as the Turner River but was renamed to avoid confusion with the Turner River near Port Hedland.
