= Caert van't Landt van d'Eendracht =

Early nautical map of Western Australia

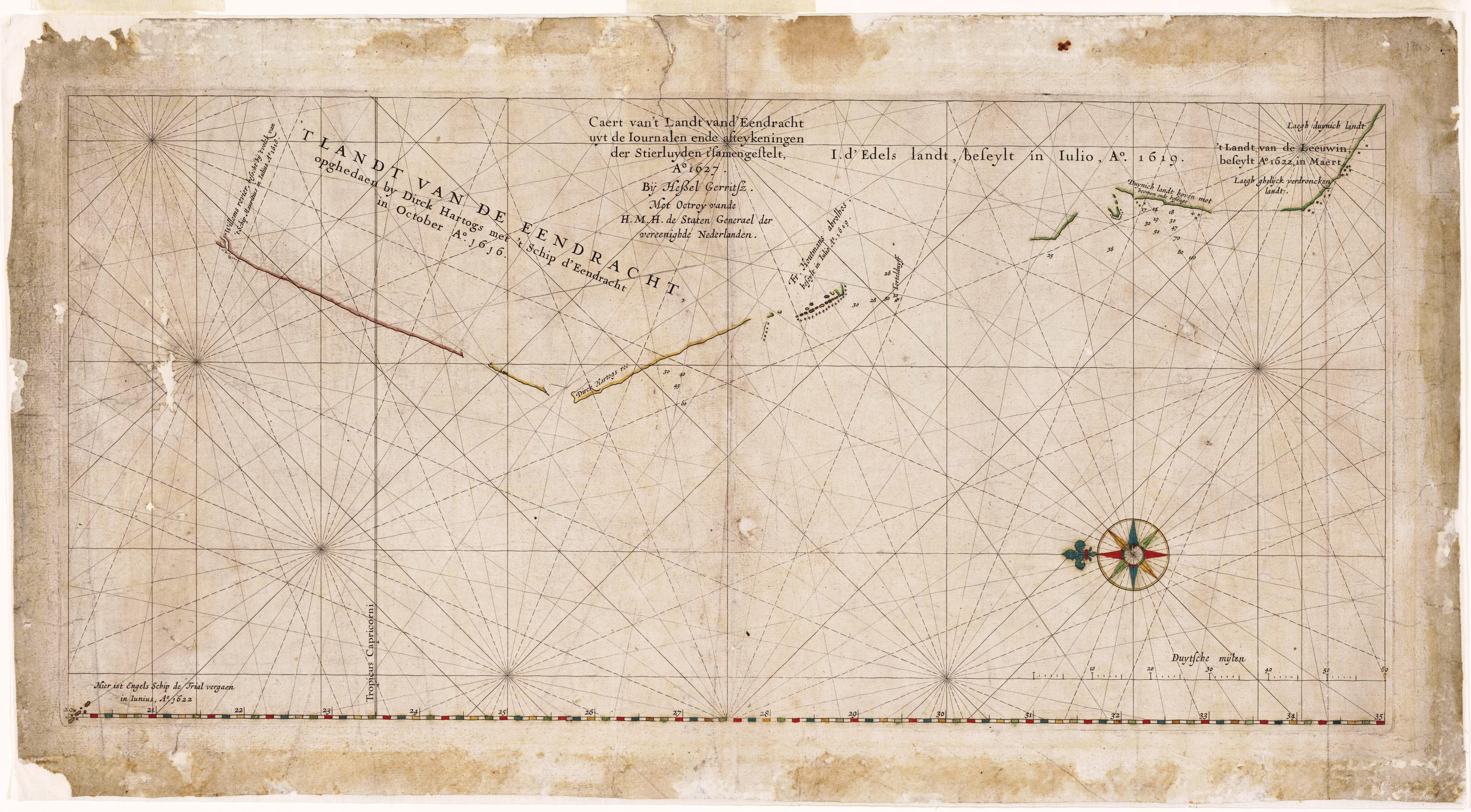
- The Caert van't Landt van d'Eendracht is one of the earliest known maps of Australia
- Ashburton River is almost exactly at the latitude at which Hessel Gerritsz' chart shows Willem River.
- Created: 1627; 398 years ago
- Author(s): Hessel Gerritsz
- Subject: Australia

Caert van't Landt van d'Eendracht (transl. Chart of the Land of Eendracht) is a 1627 map by Hessel Gerritsz. One of the earliest maps of Australia, it shows what little was then known of the west coast, based on a number of voyages beginning with the 1616 voyage of Dirk Hartog, when he named Eendrachtsland after his ship.

The map is oriented with north to the left and shows lines of latitude from 20th parallel south to the 35th parallel south and also shows the Tropic of Capricorn. The top left of the map shows a river labelled Willems revier, besocht by 't volck van 't Schip Mauritius in Iulius A° 1618 (transl. Willem's River, visited by the crew of the ship Mauritius in July 1618). The identity of this river, now referred to as Willem River, is unknown; it is possibly the Ashburton River.

In the bottom left corner is a feature labelled Hier ist Engels schip de Trial vergaen in Iunias, A° 1622 (transl. Here the English ship Trial was wrecked in June 1622). This is possibly the first appearance on a map of the Tryal Rocks, the identity of which was not determined until the 1960s.

Other than these two features, the leftmost third of the map shows a fairly straight, featureless coastline, set in between the 21st parallel south and the 26th parallel south, labelled 't Landt van de Eendracht, opghedaen by Dirck Hartogs met 't Schip d'Eendracht in October A° 1616 (transl. the Land of Eendracht, discovered by Dirk Hartog of the Eendracht in October 1616). The way this is written on the map in such bold figures implies that the Dutch were naming the entire country (land). Right on the 26th parallel south latitude is written Dirk Hartog rec showing what is now known as Dirk Hartog Island, as part of mainland Western Australia.

The middle third of the map has two main features. One, labelled Fr. Houtman's abrolhos, shows the archipelago discovered by Frederick de Houtman in 1619, and now known as the Houtman Abrolhos. Although this map was not the first to show the Houtman Abrolhos, it represents the earliest known publication of the name.

The other feature, labelled Tortelduyff (lit. 'Turtledove'), lies slightly to the south (that is, to the right) of the Houtman Abrolhos. Now known as Turtle Dove Shoal, the name is thought to signify that the shoal was first discovered by the ship Tortelduif, which is recorded as having arrived at Batavia, Dutch East Indies on 21 June 1623. Gerritsz's 1627 Caert is the earliest known map to show this feature.

The rightmost third of the map shows a section of coastline labelled 't Landt van de Leeuwin beseylt A° 1622 in Maert. (transl. Land made by the ship Leeuwin in March 1622.) This is thought to represent the coast between present-day Hamelin Bay and Point D'Entrecasteaux. Portions of this coastline are labelled Duynich landt boven met boomen ende boseage (transl. Dunes with trees and forest), Laegh ghelijck verdroncken landt (transl. Low land like flood liable land) and Laegh duynich landt (transl. Low land with dunes). This section of coastline is significant because the Leeuwin's log book is lost, and very little is known of this ship's voyage, other than what is revealed by this map.
