= New Year's Gift (ship) =

Ship operated under charter to the British East India Company

History

East India Company
- Name: New Year's Gift
- Owner: East India Company
- Port of registry: 1613: Surat, Sokotra, Java; 1613: London
- Fate: Returned London in 1616

General characteristics
- Propulsion: Sail

The New Year's Gift was an English ship sent by the East India Company to Asia for a Mughal emperor, Jahangir. It was departed with painting gifts from England to Surat in 1613 with a slogan "Hoopoe and Solomon". It was aimed at to improve or develop the relations between the Asian rulers and the company in an attempt gaining trading privileges in the region.

== Overview ==
The ship was loaded with scarlet cloak decorated with silver embroidery, glasses, and a velvet-covered chest of bottles filled with hot waters (spirits). It also included with several paintings of King James, Queen Anne, Tamerlane, and the East India Company's governor Sir Thomas Smythe along with three English ladies.

Due to long voyage and the fear of damage supposed to be occurred with paintings, the company prepared a detailed user guide with instructions for preserving and repairing of the artworks with the help of a painter-stainer, Edward Gall. He used to direct the making of frames after he accompanied the ship.

The ship, according to the SOAS University of London was sailed for Cape, Sokotra, and Surat for business purposes. It dispatched pictures and 120 oil paintings there. She later went to Java where her remaining cargo was sent Japan. The ship arrived London in 1616.
