= Lenaert Jacobszoon =

Lenaert Jacobszoon was a captain of the Dutch East India Company who, on 31 July 1618 in the vessel Mauritius, sighted North West Cape in the north-west of Western Australia mistakenly believing it to be a large island. He also named the Willems River (presumed to be Ashburton River) and the Jocob Remmessens River (presumed to be Yardie Creek) in the same voyage.

On board the ship was supercargo Willem Janszoon, former captain of the Duyfken, who wrote to the Dutch East India Company in Amsterdam about the discovery of an island during the voyage. Also on board was 25-year-old Anthony van Diemen who was later to push for the further exploration of the southern land and after whom Van Diemen's Land (Tasmania) was named.
