= Dirk Hartog =

Dutch sailor and explorer (1580–1621)

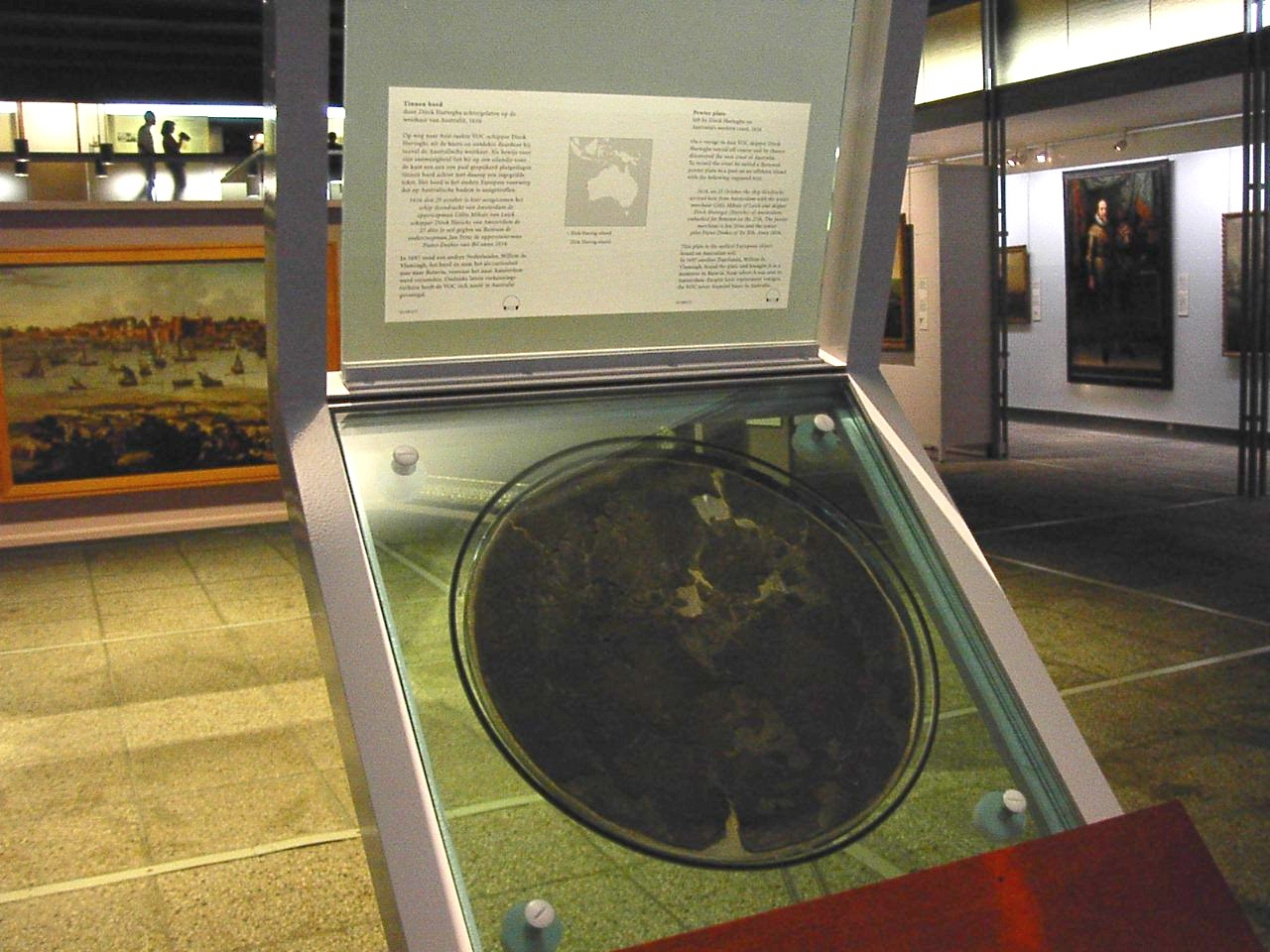
Dirk Hartog's plate in the Rijksmuseum Amsterdam

Dirk Hartog (Dutch: [ˈdɪr(ə)k ˈɦɑrtɔx]; baptised 30 October 1580 – buried 11 October 1621) was a 17th-century Dutch mariner and explorer. Dirk Hartog's expedition was the second European group to land in Australia (after Willem Janszoon) and the first to leave behind an artefact to record his visit, the Hartog Plate. His name is sometimes alternatively spelled Dirck Hartog or Dierick Hartochsz. Explorer Ernest Giles referred to him as Theodoric Hartog. The Western Australian island Dirk Hartog Island is named after Hartog.

== Early life ==
Dirk Hartog was born into a seafaring family. He was baptized on 30 October 1580 in the Oude Kerk ('old church'), Amsterdam, the Netherlands, the second son and one of at least four children of Hartych Krynen, mariner, and his wife Griet Jans.

== Name ==
At a time when Dutch spellings were not standardized, his first and family names were variously spelled. "Hartog" included Hartogszoon, Hartogsz, Hartoogs, Hatichs and Hertoghsz as his last name; "Dirk" was also Dirck or Dirick as his first name. He signed his name (in several extant documents) as Dyrck Hartoochz. In Australian history, however, he has become known as Dirk Hartog.

== Career ==
Hartog received his first ship's command at the age of 30 and spent several years engaged in successful trading ventures in the Baltic and Mediterranean seas.

In 1616, Hartog gained employment with the Dutch East India Company (Vereenigde Oostindische Compagnie, commonly abbreviated to VOC), and was appointed master of Eendracht (meaning 'concord', 'unity'), in a fleet voyaging from the Netherlands to the Dutch East Indies.

Hartog set sail in January 1616 in the company of several other VOC ships, but became separated from them in a storm, and arrived independently at the Cape of Good Hope (later to become the site of Cape Town, South Africa). Hartog then set off across the Indian Ocean for Batavia (present-day Jakarta), utilising (or perhaps blown off course by) the strong westerly winds known as the Roaring Forties which had been noted earlier by the Dutch navigator Hendrik Brouwer as enabling a quicker route to the island of Java.

On 25 October 1616, at approximately 26° latitude south, Hartog and crew came unexpectedly upon "various islands, which were, however, found uninhabited." He made landfall at an island off the coast of Shark Bay, Western Australia, which is now called Dirk Hartog Island after him. His was the second recorded European expedition to land on the Australian continent, having been preceded by Willem Janszoon in 1606, but the first to do so on the western coastline.

Map of Shark Bay area showing Dirk Hartog Island and Cape Inscription

Hartog spent three days examining the coast and nearby islands. The area was named Eendrachtsland after his ship, although that name has not endured. Before Hartog left, he affixed a pewter plate to a post, now known as the Hartog plate, on which he scratched a record of his visit to the island. Its inscription (translated from the original Dutch) reads:

1616 On 25 October arrived the ship Eendracht, of Amsterdam: Supercargo Gilles Miebais of Liege, skipper Dirch Hatichs of Amsterdam. on 27 d[itt]o. she set sail again for Bantam. Deputy supercargo Jan Stins, upper steersman Pieter Doores of Bil. In the year 1616.

Finding nothing of interest, Hartog continued sailing northwards along this previously uncharted coastline of Western Australia, making nautical charts up to about 22° latitude south. He then left the coast and continued on to Batavia, eventually arriving safely in December 1616, some five months after his expected arrival.

Dirk Hartog left the employ of the VOC upon his return to Amsterdam in 1618, resuming private trading ventures in the Baltic.

== Personal life ==
On 20 February 1611, in the Old Church, Hartog married with Calvinist forms 18-year-old Meynsgen Abels. They are not known to have had children.

== Death ==
A lifelong mariner, explorer, trader, as skipper and owner of many vessels, Hartog died in 1621, in Amsterdam, and was buried on 11 October in the grounds of the Nieuwe Kerk ('new church'). His remains were later removed to a communal grave field outside the city.

== Postscript ==
In 1619 Frederik de Houtman, in the VOC ship Dordrecht, and Jacob d'Edel, in another VOC ship Amsterdam, sighted land on the Australian coast near present-day Perth which they called d'Edelsland. After sailing northwards along the coast they made landfall in Eendrachtsland. In his journal, Houtman identified these coasts with Marco Polo's land of Beach, or Locach, as shown on maps of the time such as that of Petrus Plancius and Jan Huyghen van Linschoten.

Eighty years later, on 4 February 1697, the Dutch explorer Willem de Vlamingh landed on the island and by chance found the Hartog plate, which lay half-buried in sand. He replaced it with a new plate which reproduced Hartog's original inscription and added notes of his own, and took Hartog's original back to Amsterdam, where it is housed in the Rijksmuseum.

In 2000 the Hartog plate was temporarily returned to Australia as part of an exhibition at the Australian National Maritime Museum in Sydney. This led to suggestions that the plate, considered important as the oldest-known written artefact from Australia's European history, should be acquired for an Australian museum, but the Dutch authorities have made it clear that the plate is not for sale.

In 1966 and 1985 Hartog was depicted on Australian postage stamps, both depicting his ship. In 2016 the Perth Mint issued a 31-gram (1 ozt) silver coin to commemorate the 400th anniversary of Hartog's Australian landfall.

The island in Shark Bay, Western Australia, where he made landfall was named Dirk Hartog Island. In Amsterdam, Canberra and fourteen other Australian towns, streets have been named in his honour.

== See also ==
- Abel Tasman
- Dieppe maps
- Theory of the Portuguese discovery of Australia
