= Hessel Gerritsz =

Dutch engraver and cartographer (c. 1581 – 1632)

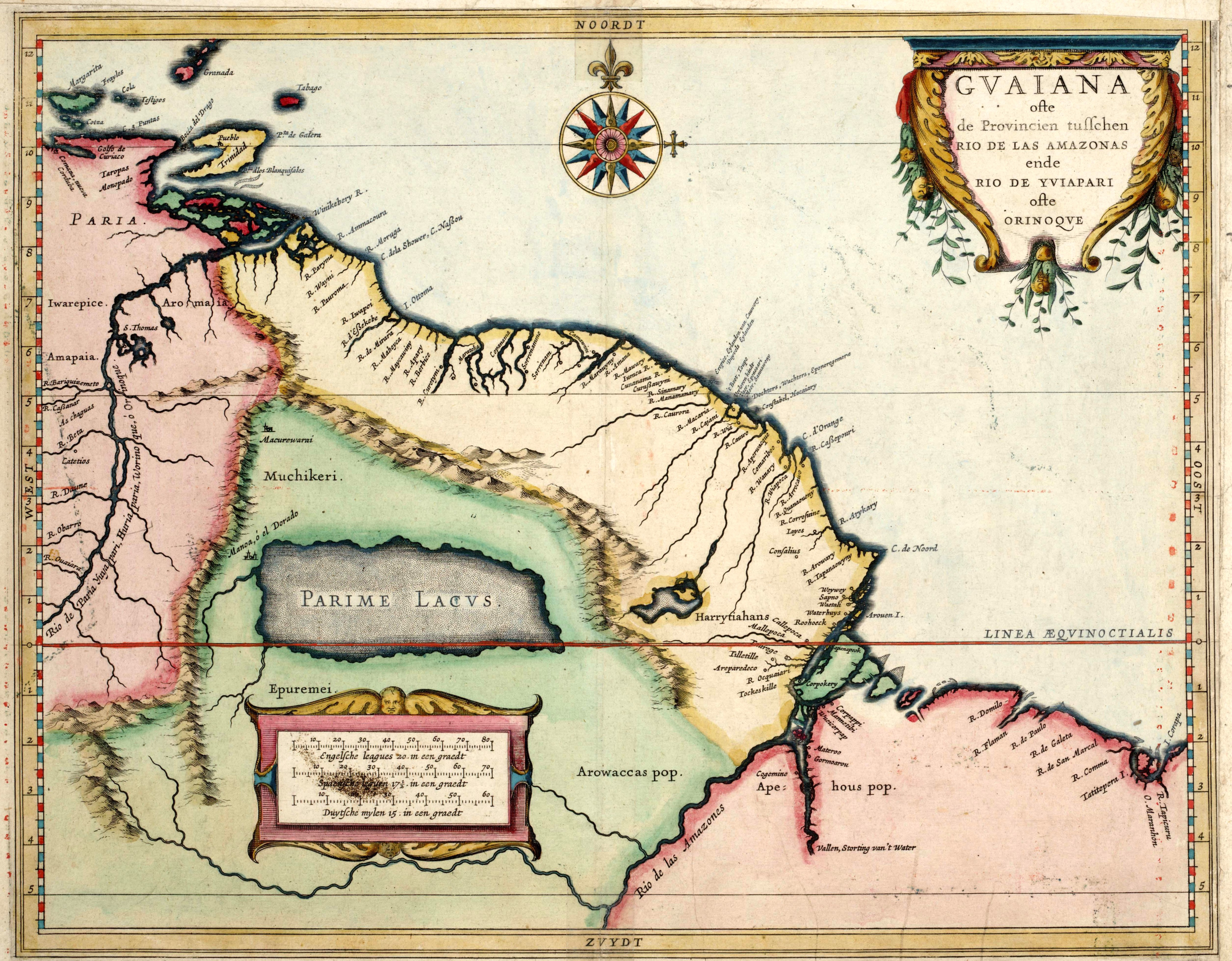
- Map of the Guianas by Gerritsz, 1625
- Born: c. 1581; Dutch Republic
- Died: 1632; Amsterdam, Dutch Republic
- Burial place: Nieuwe Kerk, Amsterdam
- Occupations: Cartographer; engraver; publisher
- Employer: Dutch East India Company

Hessel Gerritsz (c. 1581 – buried 4 September 1632) was a Dutch engraver, cartographer, and publisher. A notable figure in the Golden Age of Netherlandish cartography, despite strong competition Gerritsz is considered by some "unquestionably the chief Dutch cartographer of the 17th century".

== Biography ==
Hessel Gerritsz was born around 1581 in the northern Netherlands. Early in his career he apprenticed in Alkmaar with the cartographer and globe maker Willem Janszoon Blaeu, who was about ten years his senior. Gerritsz later moved with Blaeu's workshop to Damrak in Amsterdam, where the firm operated among the city’s booksellers and mapmakers.

In 1607, Gerritsz married Geertje Gijsberts of Alkmaar and the couple had eight children. Geertje died sometime before 1624, after which Gerritsz remarried.

== Career ==
By 1610, aged about 29, Gerritsz had established his own printing workshop on Nieuwezijds Voorburgwal in Amsterdam. As an engraver and mapmaker, he produced maps later compiled into atlases by publishers such as Willem Janszoon Blaeu and Jan Janssonius.

=== Printer ===
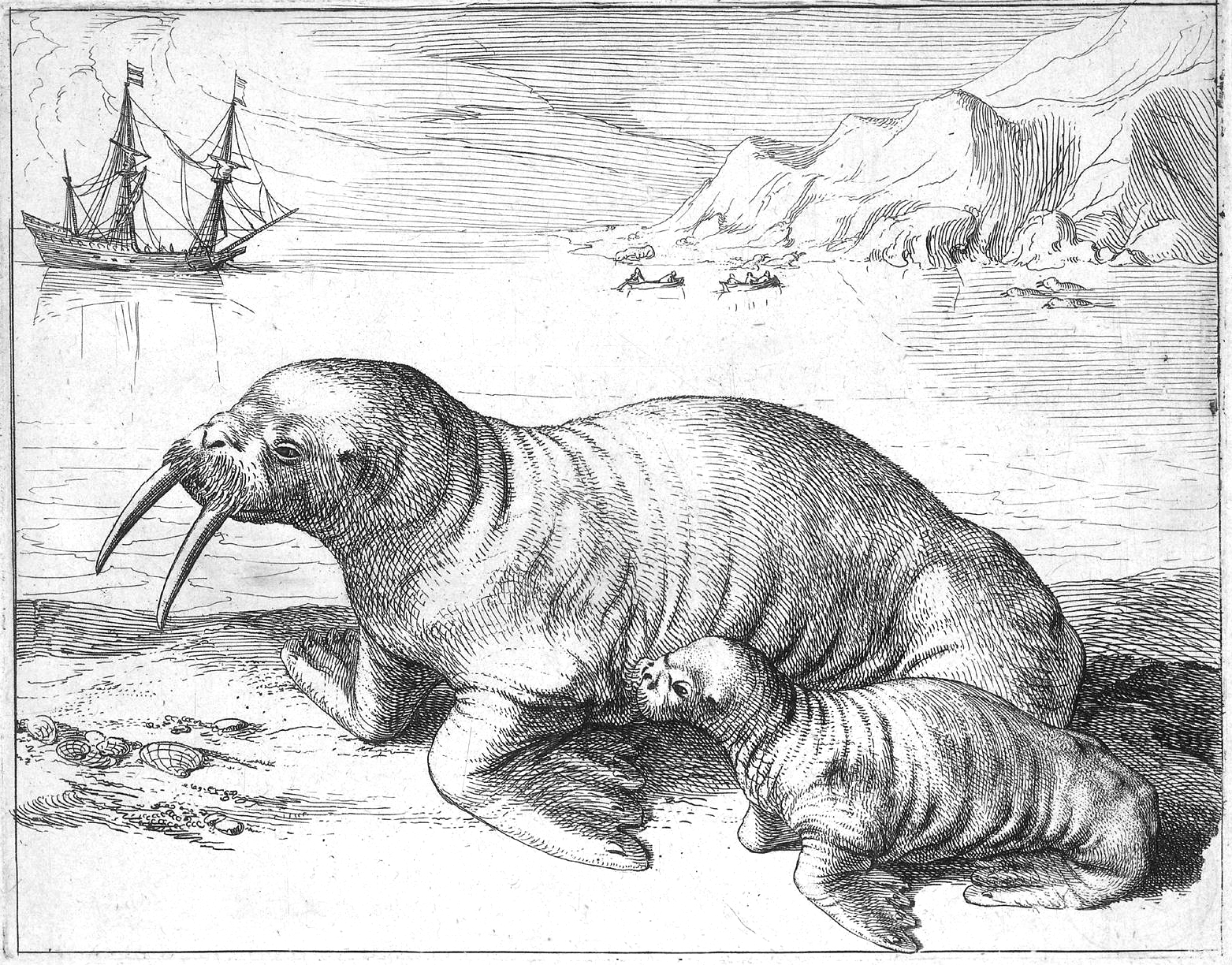
Walrus and calf, from Histoire du pays nommé Spitsberghe

Gerritsz produced a world map in 1612 that included the discoveries of Pedro Fernandes de Queirós and specifically indicated Austrialia del Espiritu Santo, now known to be Vanuatu, but for long thought to be part of the "South land". The map was very influential on Dutch and French representations of the South Pacific in the 17th and 18th centuries, and was together with Queirós' publications influential in establishing the name Australia.

In 1613, Gerritsz wrote and published a History of the land named Spitsbergen, describing the discovery, early voyages and whaling activities on these islands. This volume also showcases Gerritsz's considerable talents as an engraver (see for example his depiction of a walrus with its calf). Another example of an engraving is his often reproduced 1619 posthumous portrait of the playwright Gerbrand Adriaensz Bredero.

Also in 1613, he edited a map of Russia prepared by the future Feodor II of Russia as tsarevich, and re-edited it in 1614 with some additions and corrections; it was reproduced by the Blaeu firm until 1665.

=== Cartography ===
His fame as cartographer grew rapidly to the point that on 16 October 1617 he was appointed the first exclusive cartographer of the Dutch East India Company (abbreviated to VOC), probably the most strategic position a cartographer could have in those days. He got the position on recommendation of Petrus Plancius, chief scientist of the VOC, who did not get along with the senior Willem Blaeu (Blaeu and Gerritsz remained friends). Gerritsz kept this post until his death, after which the position was held by the Blaeu family, starting with Willem Jansz, until 1705.

Gerritsz's map of 1622 showed the first part of Australia to be charted, that by Willem Janszoon in 1606. It was considered to be part of New Guinea and called Nueva Guinea on the map, but Gerritsz also added an inscription saying:

Those who sailed with the yacht of Pedro Fernandez de Quiros in the neighbourhood of New Guinea to 10 degrees westward through many islands and shoals and over 2, 3 and 4 fathoms for as many as 40 days, presumed that New Guinea did not extend beyond 10 degrees to the south. If this be so, then the land from 9 to 14 degrees would be a separate land, different from the other New Guinea [...].

All charts and logs from returning VOC merchants and explorers sailors had to be submitted to Gerritsz and thanks to the wealth of new information several breakthrough maps came from his hands. In return Gerritsz' charts accompanied all VOC captains on their voyages.

=== Mapping of Australia ===
In 1612 Gerritsz published a Dutch translation in Amsterdam of the eighth memorial of Queirós, the title page of which includes the words, "Land ghenaemt Australia Incognita". This is believed to be "the earliest occurrence in print of the word Australia outside Spain". This 1612 publication also included Isaac Massa's description of Siberia (Samoyeden Landt) and his short account of the roads from Muscovy. The publication included three maps, one of which was a map of the world by Gerritsz, in which the Torres Strait is clearly shown.

In 1618, Gerritsz produced a chart of the Indonesian islands, far better represented than on earlier efforts, and, for the first time, the (northwest) coast of Australia. In 1622 he bundled many of his maps in a map book for the VOC. This map book included a 1622 map of the Pacific, probably the "Map of the Great South Sea" that Abel Tasman consulted extensively on his voyage around Australia and to New Zealand in 1642.

In 1627 Gerritsz made a map, the Caert van't Landt van d'Eendracht, entirely devoted to the discoveries of the Western Australian coastline. On that map Australia is called Eendrachtsland, a name given by Dirk Hartog after his stay on its coast in 1616, and which would be in use until the end of the 17th century. In 1628, he added the 1627 charting of Australia’s south coast by François Thijssen to the map mentioned above, making this the first map showing an outline of Australia.

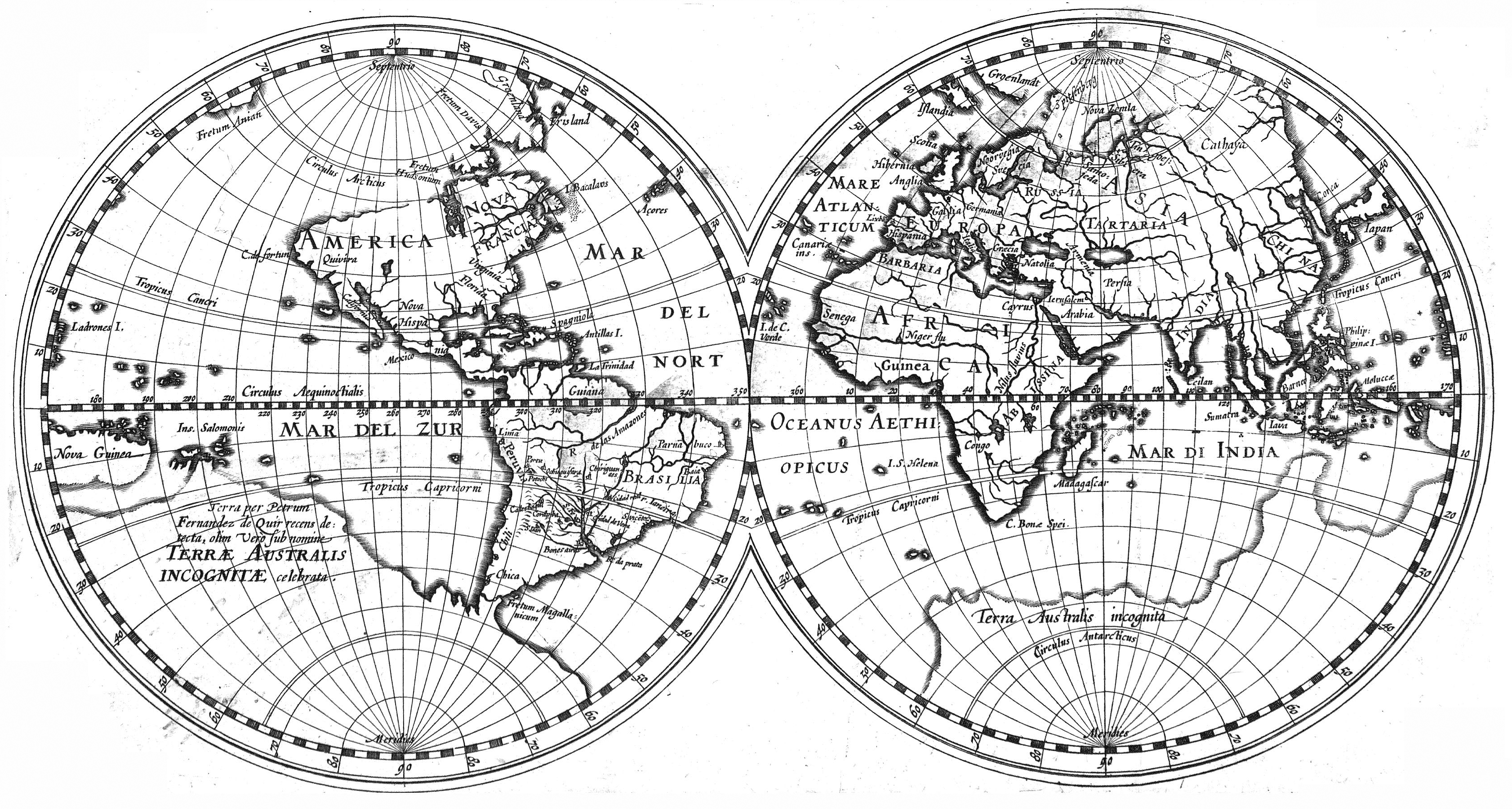
1612 map that includes the discovery of La Austrialia del Espiritu Santo by Pedro Fernandes de Queirós

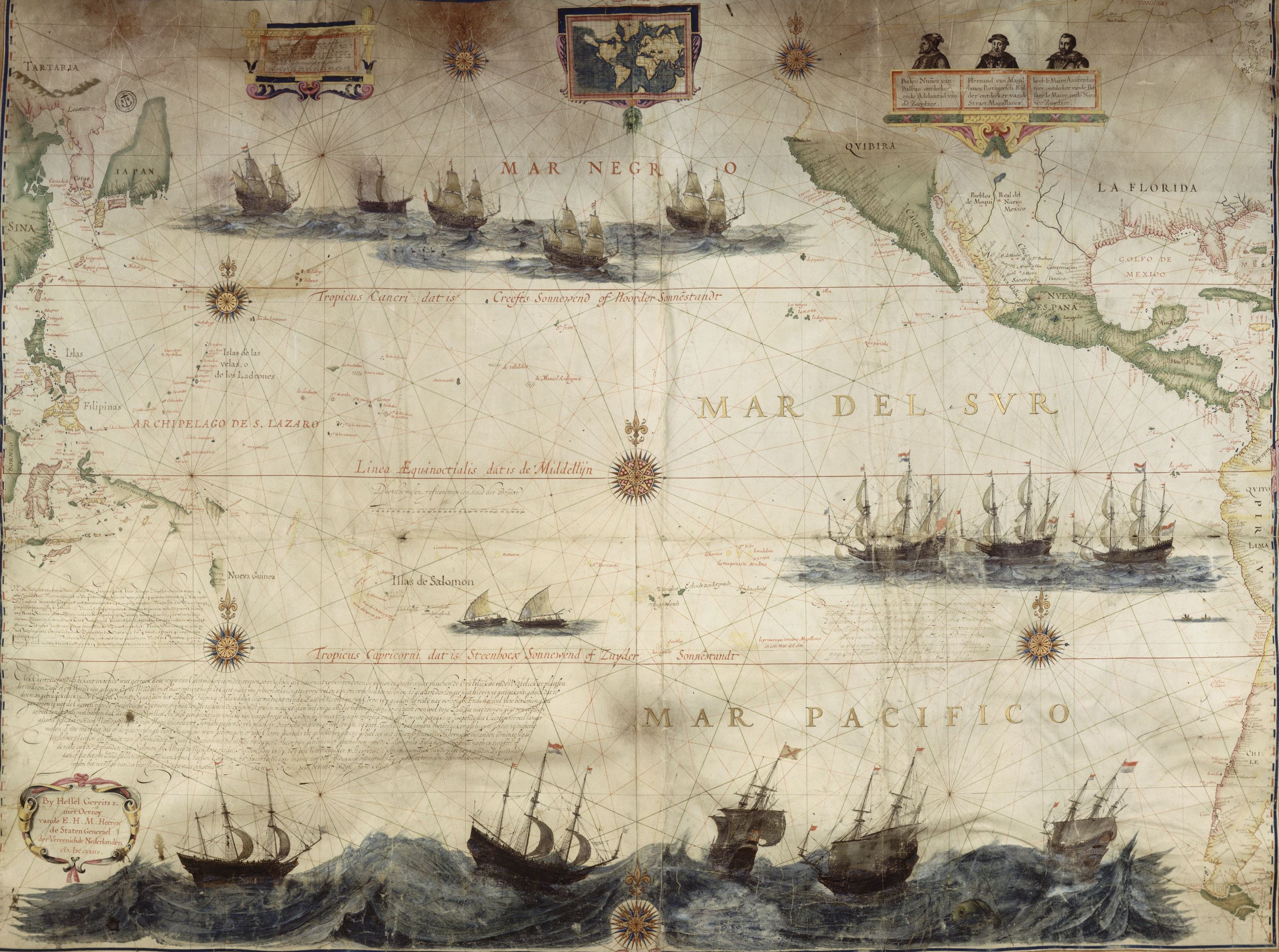
South Seas, Pacific Ocean, 1622

== Later years and death ==
Gerritsz's interest in the New World was so extensive that, unusual for a cartographer in his position, he joined on a 1628–1629 voyage to Brazil and the Caribbean. He contributed the maps of Joannes de Laet's Beschrijvinghe van West-Indiën (lit. 'Description of the West Indies') published in 1630. Especially his map of Florida, based on French and Spanish sources, became influential; for 200 years after, Florida would be known as Tegesta as Gerritsz had named it.

Gerritsz died in 1632 in Amsterdam, Dutch Republic, and was buried in the Nieuwe Kerk on 4 September, aged about 50.

== Sources ==
- Camino, Mercedes Maroto (2005). Producing the Pacific: Maps and Narratives of Spanish Exploration. Portada Hispánica Series. Vol. 18. Amsterdam: Rodopi Publishers. ISBN 9042019948. ISSN 1383-4037. OL 9854315M.
- Engelbrecht, W.A.; Herwerden, P.J. van (1945). De Ontdekkingsreis van Jacob le Maire en Willem Cornelisz. Schouten in de jaren 1615–1617 (in Dutch). 's-Gravenhage: Martinus Nijhoff. LCCN 49042303. OCLC 5752277. OL 6059693M.
- Gerritsz, Hessel (1612). "Verhael van seker Memorial gepresenteert aen Sijne Majesteyt by den capiteyn Pedro Fernandez de Quir". Beschryvinghe van der Samoyeden Landt in Tartarien (in Dutch and Spanish). Amsterdam: Hessel Gerritsz – via Göttingen State and University Library. "Een Memoriael gepresenteert aen den Coningh van Spaengien, belanghende de ontdeckinghe ende gheleghentheyt van't Land ghenaemt Australia Incognita."
- Gerritsz, Hessel (1622). Mar del Sur, Mar Pacifico [South Seas, Pacific Ocean] (Map) (in Dutch and Spanish). hdl:loc.wdl/wdl.18564. LCCN 2021668722. OCLC 455935924.
- Hughes, Lindsey, ed. (1993). New perspectives on Muscovite history: selected papers from the 4. World Congress for Soviet and East European Studies, Harrogate, 1990. Basingstoke: Macmillan. ISBN 9780333553305.
- Keuning, Johannes (1949). Bagrow, Leo (ed.). "Hessel Gerritsz". Imago Mundi. 6 (1): 49–66. doi:10.1080/03085694908591931. ISSN 0308-5694. LCCN 36022520. OCLC 612175130.
- Mutch, Thomas Davies (May 2006) [1942]. Colin Choat; Bob Forsyth (eds.). The First Discovery of Australia: With an account of the Voyage of the "Duyfken" and the Career of Captain Willem Jansz. Project Gutenberg Australia. Wikidata Q134080902.
- Quir, Petrum Ferdinandez de (1612). "Relatio Memorialis, sive libelli fupplicis Majefti Sua oblate per Capitaneum Petrum Ferdinandez de Quir, Super Detectione quartæ Orbis Terrarum parte, cui nomen Australis Incognita, eiusque immensis opibus & fertilitate" [A Memorial Report, or a Book of Letters Presented to His Majesty by Captain Peter Ferdinand de Quir, on the Discovery of the Fourth Part of the World, Called the Unknown South, and Its Immense Wealth and Fertility]. In Gerritsz, Hessel (ed.). Narratio Serenissimo Regi Hispaniæ facta, super tractu, in quinta orbis terrarum parte, cui Australiæ incognitæ nomen est, recens detecto, per capitaneum Petrum Ferdinandez de Quir [A narrative made to the King of Spain, concerning a tract in the fifth part of the world, which is called Australia, recently discovered, by Captain Peter Ferdinandez de Quir] (in Latin). Amsterdam: Hesselij Gerardi. pp. 16–29. LCCN 42027842. OCLC 1156374696. OL 27253212M.
- Wieder, Frederik Caspar (1942). Tasman's kaart van zijn Australische ontdekkingen 1644 "de Bonaparte-kaart", gereproduceerd op de ware grootte in goud en kleuren naar het origineel in de Mitchell Library, Sydney (N.S.W.); met toestemming van de autoriteiten door F.C. Wieder (in Dutch). 's-Gravenhage: Martinus Nijhoff. OCLC 64133523.
- Woods, Martin (2013). "For the Dutch Republic, the Great Pacific". In National Library of Australia (ed.). Mapping our World: Terra Incognita to Australia. Canberra: National Library of Australia. ISBN 9780642278098. OCLC 50401968.
