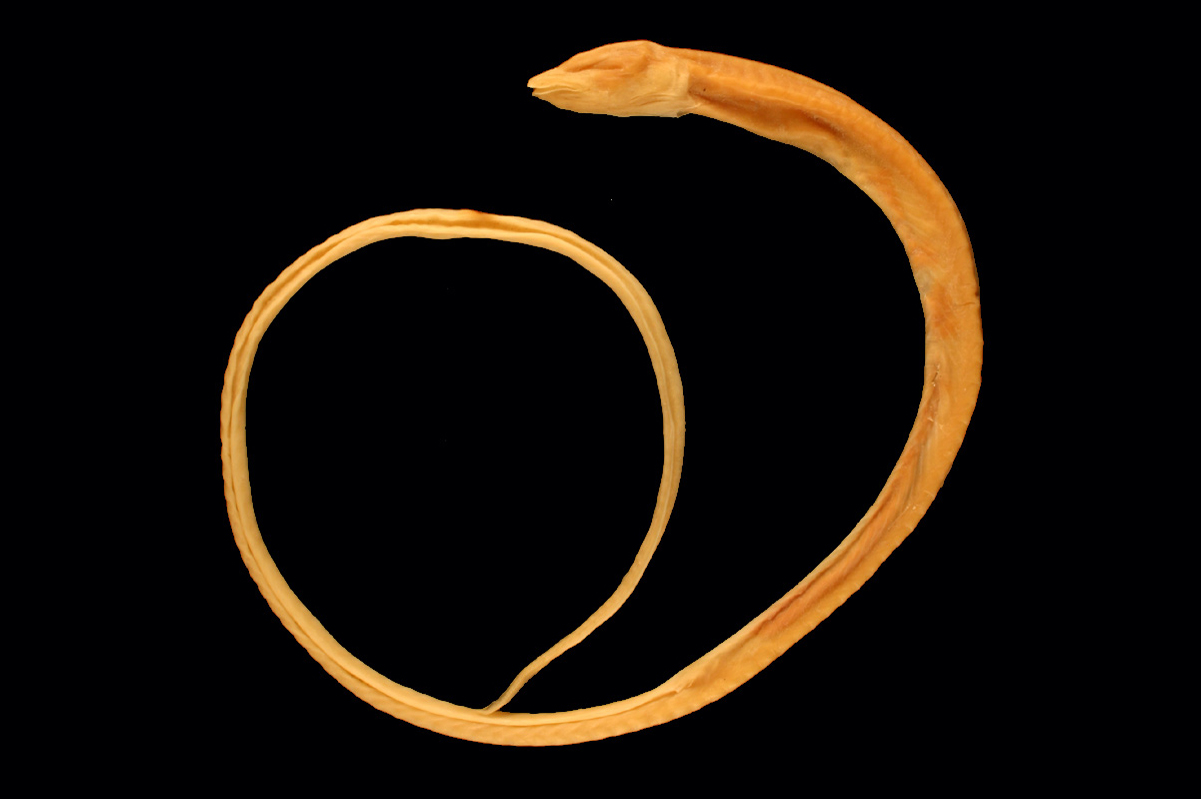

Conservation status
- Endangered (IUCN 3.1)

Scientific classification
- Kingdom: Animalia
- Phylum: Chordata
- Class: Actinopterygii
- Order: Synbranchiformes
- Family: Synbranchidae
- Genus: Ophisternon
- Species: O. candidum

Binomial name
- Ophisternon candidum (Mees, 1962)

Synonyms
- Anommatophasma candidum Mees, 1962

= Blind cave eel =

Species of fish

The blind cave eel (Ophisternon candidum) is a species of cavefish in the family Synbranchidae. It is the longest cavefish in Australia (up to 40 cm (16 in)) and one of the only three vertebrates in Australia that is restricted to underground waters, the other being the blind gudgeon (Milyeringa veritas) and the Barrow cave gudgeon (Milyeringa justitia). It is blind, its body is eel-like and elongated, and it has a non-pigmented skin with colours ranging from white to pink.

The blind cave eel is endemic to northwestern Australia, specifically in the Cape Range region, the Pilbara Region, and the Barrow Island region. It is rarely spotted due to its habitat and has only been spotted 36 times from 1959 to 2017. Notably, there is an evolving independent parentage in the Pilbara region showing a significant genetic difference from other blind cave eels.

The blind cave eel lives in a total darkness environment in underground waters disconnecting from the surface seawater. They typically live in caves and burrow into sediments. Their feeding include crustaceans, cave substrate organisms, and sometimes terrestrials washed into the cave system. Little is known about their behaviour except a finding revealing the male blind cave eel takes the responsibility of constructing and guarding their habitation.

The blind cave eel is an aquarium and research fish with no threat to humans. It is listed as vulnerable according to the Environment Protection and Biodiversity Conservation Act 1999 and listed as endangered according to the IUCN Red List. On 26 March 2008, the Australian Minister signed a piece of conservation advice acknowledging threats from human activities and the volatile environment. It then suggested priority actions for researchers, regional and local communities to assist in recovery. An obstacle to the conservation progress is identified as the inaccessibility of the blind cave eel, the situation is abate by the introduction of environmental DNA species-specific PCR assays in 2020 allows for a better sampling method.

== Taxonomy ==
In 1962, the species had an original description of Anommatophasma candidum with the word "Anommatophasma" representing a new genus. Subsequently, it is synonymised to "Ophisternon candidum" in 1976 by Rosen and Greenwood. The etymology of the scientific name Ophisternon candidum comes from the Greek word ophis which means "serpent", the Greek word sternon which means "chest" and the Latin word Candidus which means "white" referencing its skin colour.

The vernacular name of Ophisternon candidum is blind cave eel in Australia and United Kingdom, whereas its name is blind freshwater eel in the United States. The vernacular name suggests its eel-like body, living in a cave and having no visible eyes.

== Description ==
The blind cave eel is Australia's longest cavefish and may grow up to 400 mm (16 in). However, common total lengths for mature adults have an average of 340 mm (13 in) and range between 60 and 385 mm (2.4 and 15.2 in) . Its head length accounts for 5.6–6.3%, pre-anus length accounts for 35.8–41.8%, snout length accounts for 0.82–1.11% and gape length accounts for 1.59–2.01% of its total length.

Its body is round, elongated and eel-like. Its head is very short comparatively without visible external eyes. There are multiple indistinct pairs of slimy pores on its head. It has a large mouth and thick interior lips. It has several rows of strong teeth and a well-evolved tongue. There are two pairs of nostrils, the smaller pair being on top of the upper lip at the snout and the larger pair between the snout and its forehead. Several longitudinal cutaneous folds can be found around its throat. The blind cave eel has four pairs of evolved gills with a crescent in shape. The openings of its gills are extensive and horizontal. No scales or fins can be found except for the presence of a slim rayless membrane around the tail. There is an apparent lateral-line system from its head to close to the tip of its tail. Its anus is located in the front half of the body. Moreover, the blind cave eel has a total vertebrae ranging from 151 to 169 where 51–54 of them are pre-anal vertebrae and 97–117 of them are post-anal vertebrae.

The blind cave eel colours vary between unpigmented to white or pink.

== Distribution and genetic difference ==
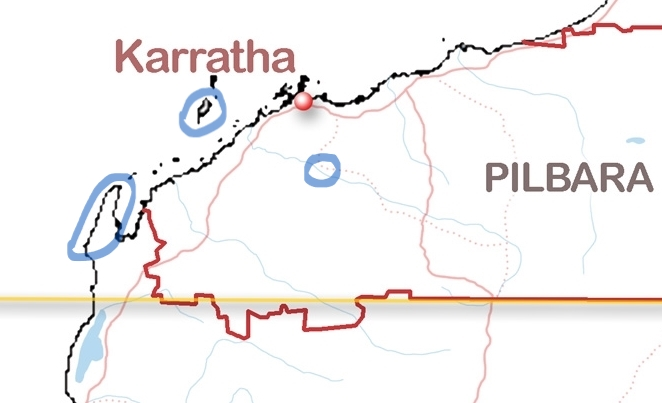
Blue area depicts recorded distribution of the blind cave eel endemic to the north-western Australia

The Blind cave eel has only been spotted 36 times in 20 sites from 1959 to 2017. Observations were made in 3 regions; Cape Range, Pilbara, and Barrow Island, which makes the blind cave eel endemic to north-western Australia.

In the Cape Range region, there are 14 sites in total as recorded by the Western Australian Museum, making the region the most common place to spot a blind cave eel. Sites include Tantabiddi Well, Milyering Well, Ned's Well, Dozer Cave, Pilgramunna Well, Kubura Well cave, South of Yardie Creek, Mowbowra Well, Kudumurra Well, Wobiri Rock Hole, New Mowbowra Well, Tidal Cave, Kudamurra Well and an unnamed site with a coordinate of 21'47'S, 114'10'E.

In the Pilbara Region, there are 3 sites including the Exploration bore BC186-155, Borehole JW023, and Borehole JW024.

In the Barrow Island Region, there are 3 sites including the Seismic testing site E1918, Anode Well T2, and Anode Well L15.

Both the Pilbara Region and the Barrow Island Region were not discovered until 2009, from 1959 to 2009 blind cave eels were assumed to be restricted within 100 km in the Cape Range subterranean. Recovery of a specimen from the mineral exploration bore BC186-155 in the Pilbara region near Bungaroo Creek in 2009, extending the known distribution range to 200 km. Notably, the blind cave eel near Bungaroo shows a genetic difference from those from other locations, possibly due to sufficient isolation resulting in an evolving independent parentage.

== Habitat ==
The preferred habitat consists of underground waters and caves, in which the waters have a very high salinity level and are stratified markedly from the surface freshwater. The underground waters have a pH value of 7–8, salinity level of 1–8%, hardness (CaCO_{3}) of 220–1500 mg and conductivity of 115–1250 mS. Although it is altered by marine tides, there is a deficiency of surface connection with the surface freshwater. The blind cave eel is restricted to underground waters, in which only two vertebrate animals in Australia share such habitat, the other being the Blind gudgeon (Milyeringa veritas). The underground waters where the blind cave eel lives are a lightless subterranean system, indicating the adaptiveness of a total darkness environment.

The blind cave eel likes to live in pastoral wells, dark caverns, fissures, under coastal limestone or burrow into sediments with a soft bottom. Due to the blind cave eel's habit, it is very difficult for people to access underground waters and its sites are usually too small. Therefore, most of the recorded sightings are by observation rather than voucher specimens because it is unlikely to trap or net the blind cave eel. Moreover, the recorded sightings lack the lower part of the anchialine system and there are no more than three blind cave eels spotted on a single occasion.

== Feeding ==
The blind cave eel feeds primarily based on crustaceans in subterranean and other cave substrate organisms, but have also been documented to feed on terrestrials washed into the cave system. In the gut contents examined by the Western Australia Museum, Halosbaena tulki, Stygiocaris, Philosciidae, and larvae are found. Despite being restricted to subterranean waters adapting a characteristic of faecal ooze, it is sometimes observed in shallow water lying on rock surfaces on its own or in pairs.

== Reproduction ==
Little is known about the blind cave eel's life cycle due to the inaccessibility of voucher specimens. For mating behaviour, the male blind cave eel tends to take the responsibility of building a nest or burrow and guarding over it.

== Importance to humans ==
The blind cave eel has no threat to humans. It is not consumable, and fisheries have no interest in it. The blind cave eel is mainly for research uses and scarcely in an aquarium. There is only one occasion where two voucher specimens WAM P.34487-001 (1) and (2) were collected from Anode Well L15 in the Barrow Island Region in 2015. The two blind cave eels stayed alive in the aquarium and were kept in source water for several days.

== Conservation ==
=== Conservation status ===
The Environment Protection and Biodiversity Conservation Act 1999 assessed the blind cave eel as vulnerable, and the Endangered Species Protection Act 1992 also assessed it as vulnerable. In the Wildlife Conservation Act 1950 in Western Australia and Wildlife Conservation Notice 2006(2) specially for protected fauna, the blind cave eel is accessed as rare. The International Union for Conservation of Nature (IUCN) Red List of Threatened Species accessed the blind cave eel as endangered.

=== Human activities ===
Threats identified by the blind cave eel approved conservation advice covers a range of human activities incorporating mining, urban development, construction, dumping and landfill. Diffuse pollution, point source pollution, and sedimentation are the results of such activities. Moreover, feral fish particularly guppy might also invade the territory of blind cave fish in open sites.

In the region Cape Range, while the Ningaloo Coast World Heritage Area secured the west and north coast, in other parts several collection sites have diminished by marina developments and water extraction. In the region Barrow Island, while it is a nature reserve rated as A-class, gas field nearby exercise mining processes which cover the areas of the blind cave eel samples collected and therefore potentially threaten it. In the region Pilbara, it is heavily impacted by substantial water extraction and mining activities due to none of those areas being protected nor conserved. Given the differentiation of genetics in Pilbara, the urge for conservation management and legislation to minimize human activities are noteworthy.

=== Approved conservation advice ===
The Australian Minister approved a piece of conservation advice on 26 March 2008, reacting to the vulnerability of the blind cave eel under s266B of the Environment Protection and Biodiversity Conservation Act 1999. In this conservation advice, priorities for researchers and priorities actions for regional and local are given to expand the knowledge of the blind cave eel and assist its recovery.

==== Priorities for researchers ====
The conservation advice suggested further exploration of the blind cave eel's genetic variation pattern. It also suggested a further investigation of the distribution of population size, ecological requisite and relative threatening processes' influence.

==== Priorities actions for regional and local ====
The conservation advice suggested three aspects to assist recovery of the blind cave eel.

The first aspect is to protect the blind cave eel habitat and abate disturbance around the area. It suggested seeking formal covenants and conservation agreements to restrict human activities and land use near the Cape Range region, the Pilbara Region and the Barrow Island region. It also states the importance of protecting the groundwater ecosystem and the necessity of keeping sediments and point source pollution away from the groundwater ecosystem, such as petrochemicals, leachates and sewage. Moreover, the conservation advice proposed continuous monitoring of the 3 known regions and updating their management actions accordingly to analyze their recovery progress and effectiveness. This includes a sudden change of hydrology or water flows disruption which might lead to unstable water table levels and a magnification of run-off and pollution.

The second aspect is to identify the competitors and predators in the groundwater ecosystem near the blind cave eel. This includes diseases, parasites and fish species that threaten the blind cave eel and managerial actions should be implemented to exclude them.

The third aspect is to spread conservation information and educate the local community to raise awareness of the blind cave eel. The conservation advice put forward that the blind cave eel is restricted to subterranean waters thus the general public is unlikely to access areas around the habitat of the blind cave eel, restraining their understanding of it.

=== Environmental DNA detection ===
In 2020, environmental DNA species-specific PCR assays are introduced for a larger sampling population, making the inspection and monitoring of this rare species easier and conservation advice could be implemented more accurately. The new detection method replaced the traditional relatively ineffective sampling method and overcame the obstacle of the blind cave eel being habitually rare. Furthermore, the method also grants an accurate detection of invasive species allowing quick implementation of strategies to mitigate threats in the region.
