= Milyeringa =

Scientific classification
- Kingdom: Animalia
- Phylum: Chordata
- Class: Actinopterygii
- Division: Teleostei
- Order: Gobiiformes
- Family: Milyeringidae
- Genus: Milyeringa; Whitley, 1945

Type species
- Milyeringa veritas Whitley, 1945

Genus of fishes

Milyeringa is a genus of blind cavefish from the Cape Range and Barrow Island, northwestern Australia. Although traditionally considered to belong to the family Eleotridae, studies show that they represent a distinct and far-separated lineage together with the Typhleotris cavefish from Madagascar, leading some to move them to their own family, Milyeringidae. The generic name is taken from Milyering which is 20 miles (32 km) southwest of Vlamingh Head in the North West Cape of Western Australia, the type locality for Milyeringa veritas.

== Species ==
The recognized species of this genus are:

- Milyeringa justitia Larson & Foster, 2013 (Barrow cave gudgeon)
- Milyeringa veritas Whitley, 1945 (blind gudgeon)
