= List of State Register of Heritage Places in the Shire of Exmouth =

The State Register of Heritage Places is maintained by the Heritage Council of Western Australia. As of 2026, 38 places are heritage-listed in the Shire of Exmouth, of which six are on the State Register of Heritage Places.

== List ==
The Western Australian State Register of Heritage Places, as of 2026, lists the following six state registered places within the Shire of Exmouth:

Place name	Place #	Location	Suburb or town	Co-ordinates	Built	State registered	Notes	Photo
Vlaming Head Lighthouse Group	837	Yardie Creek Road	Exmouth	21.807700°S 114.111500°E	1912	22 May 2007		
Norwegian Bay Whaling Station	4231	Norwegian Bay, North of Point Cloates	Ningaloo	22.592724°S 113.671952°E	1915	22 August 2006	Also referred to as Point Cloates Whaling Station	
Point Cloates Lighthouse & Quarters (ruins)	5491	160 km South of North West Cape	Ningaloo Station	22.701794°S 113.682379°E	1910	22 August 2006	Also referred to as Point Cloates Lightstation	
Vlaming Head Radar	10640		Exmouth	21.807700°S 114.111500°E	1943		Also referred to as World War II Aircraft Warning Radar; Part of Vlaming Head Lighthouse Group Precinct (837)	
Vlamingh Head Lighthouse Quarters	23799	Yardie Creek Road	Exmouth	21.808538°S 114.114390°E			Part of Vlaming Head Lighthouse Group Precinct (837)	
Vlamingh Head Lighthouse	24419	Yardie Creek Road	Exmouth	21.807822°S 114.111120°E			Part of Vlaming Head Lighthouse Group Precinct (837)	
