= Milyeringa justitia =

Conservation status
- Critically Endangered (IUCN 3.1)

- Vulnerable (EPBC Act)

Scientific classification
- Kingdom: Animalia
- Phylum: Chordata
- Class: Actinopterygii
- Division: Teleostei
- Order: Gobiiformes
- Family: Milyeringidae
- Genus: Milyeringa
- Species: M. justitia

Binomial name
- Milyeringa justitia Larson & Foster, 2013

Species of fish

Milyeringa justitia, the Barrow cave gudgeon, is a species of ray-finned fish belonging to the family Milyeringidae, the cave gudgeons. This cavefish is endemic to Western Australia.

== Tazonomy ==
Milyeringa justitia was first formally described in 2013 by the Australian ichthyologists Helen Kay Larson and Ralph Foster with its type locality given as a well on Barrow Island, Western Australia, ay 20°49'2.31"S, 115°23'41.98"E. The Barrow cave gudgeon is classified in the genus Milyeringa which was described in 1945 by Gilbert Percy Whitley when he described Milyeringa veritas, which he designated as its type species, as well as being the type species by monotypy. The genus Milyeringa is classified in the family Milyeringidae, the cave gudgeons or blind cave gobies, which is classified within the suborder Gobioidei, the gobies, of the order Gobiiformes, which also includes the cardinalfishes and sand divers.

== Etymology ==
Milyeringa justitia is classified in the genus Milyeringa, which is derived from Milyering, a location 32 km (20 mi) southwest of Vlamingh Head, North West Cape, Western Australia, the type locality of M. veritas. The specific name justitia is Latin for "justice" and was given by the describers to complement the specific name of M. veritas which means "truth" in the hope that "As truth and justice are supposed to go together, we name this species justitia, from the Latin for justice, in the hope that justice helps the species to survive on Barrow Island, which has been an oilfield since 1967 and is most recently the site of the Gorgon Gas Hub development."

== Description ==
Milyeringa justitia has an elongated body and it reaches a maximum standard length of 2.3 cm (0.91 in). The first dorsal fin is absent, a vestigial pterygiophore is visisble in a CT scan, the second dorsal fin has 6 soft rays and the anal fon has 6 or 7 soft rays. This troglobitic species has a pale body, lacking in pigment, and it is eyeless and blind, using sensory papillae located on the head and body to allow it to feed and move around in total darkness.

== Distribution and habitat ==
Milyeringa justitia is endemic to groundwater systems (aquifers) of Barrow Island, around 50 km off the Pilbara coast in Western Australia. Very little is known about M. justitia as between 2002 and 2013 only six specimens were collected but its biology is assumed to be similar to that of M. veritas.
