= Yardie Creek Station =

Pastoral lease in Western Australia

Coordinates: 21°53′20.59″S 114°00′55.89″E

Location in Western Australia

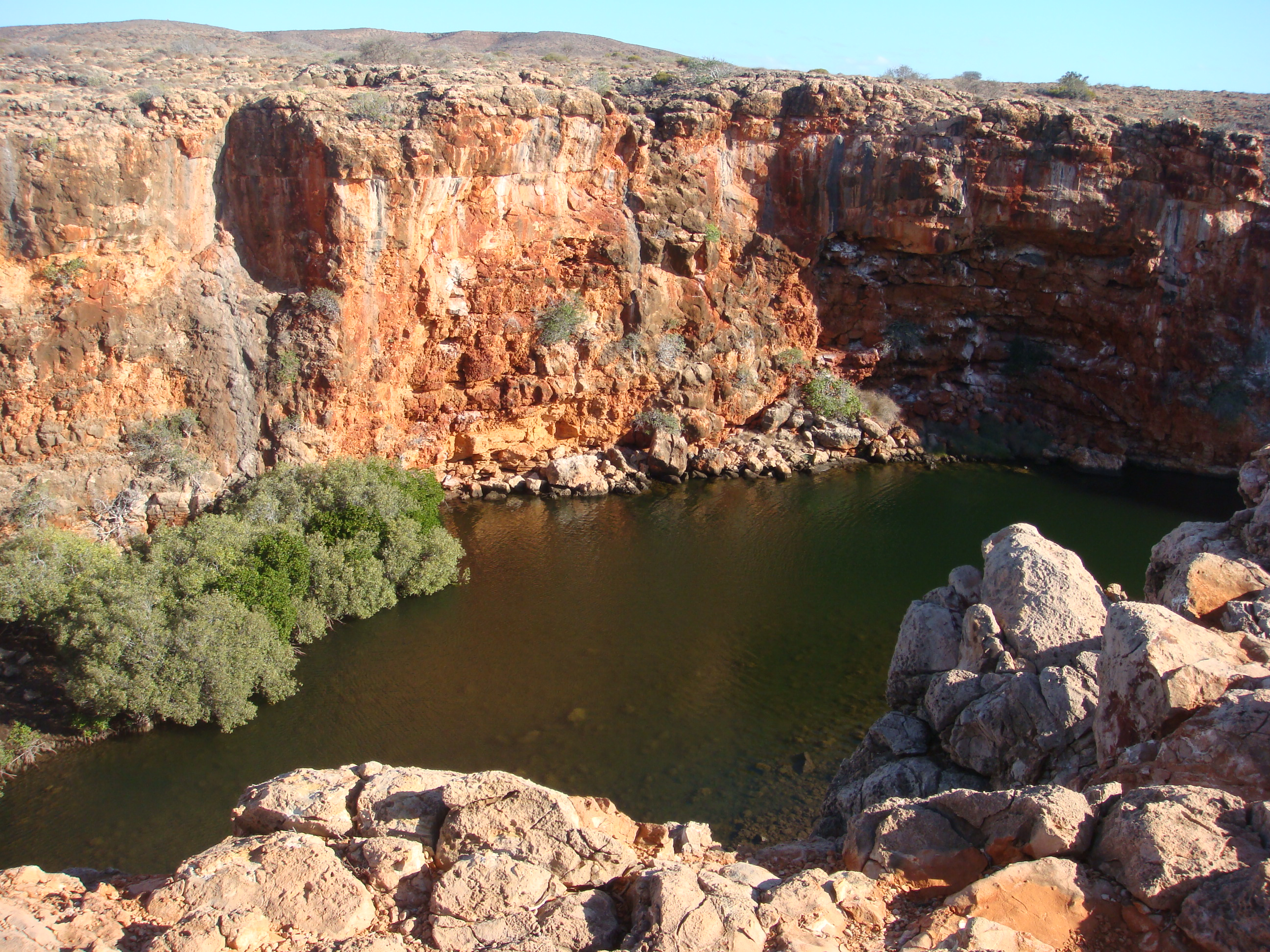
Yardie Creek Gorge

Yardie Creek, or Yardie Creek Station, is a pastoral lease and sheep station located in the Gascoyne region of Western Australia. It is situated approximately 12.5 kilometres (8 mi) west-northwest of Exmouth and 143 kilometres (89 mi) north of Coral Bay.

The area was under pastoral lease beginning in 1876 when J Brockman acquired leases in the area covering North West Cape to run cattle. Brockman sold parts of the lease in 1888 to ornithologist Thomas Carter, including Yardie Creek, Exmouth Gulf and Ningaloo Station. Carter was the first settler in the area and established a pastoral station in 1889 grazing sheep. The working station was resumed by the government in December 1969 as part of the Cape Range National Park.

The station experienced drought conditions in 1912, after which it was overrun by kangaroos who came from the hill country in search of water. The following year a station partner, Mr A. O. Holst, reported the country had reasonable rains with 6 inches (152 mm) falling in June followed by a 3-inch (76 mm) downpour in July.

Arnold Owen Holst and Alexander Campbell dissolved their partnership in 1927; Campbell remained at Yardie Creek and took up in partnership with Eric Arthur Payne some time soon after. The station took delivery of 50 rams in 1928, followed by 50 merino rams from Walebing in 1929.

The partnership between Campbell and Payne was dissolved in 1936, with Payne being in control of the lease.

Campbell abandoned the station in 1938 following drought and the Great Depression and went to Perth. He claimed the station had been improved from virgin country of a value of about £14,000.

The Payne family held the lease for the station until 1962.

In 1946 many of the buildings around the station were destroyed by a cyclone. The station was hit by another cyclone in 1953, resulting in extensive damage to the homestead and several outbuildings being demolished.

The Broad family were the last occupiers of the pastoral lease and they left the area in 1970. The area was declared a national park in 1964, and the Ningaloo Marine Park was declared in 1987.

The Yardie Creek homestead was registered as a heritage site on the Register of the National Estate in 1978. Parts of the timber and iron used to build the out-buildings were salvaged from SS Mildura. The ship was carrying cattle from the Kimberley when it was driven aground and wrecked on North West Reef in 1907 during a cyclone.

== See also ==
- List of pastoral leases in Western Australia
