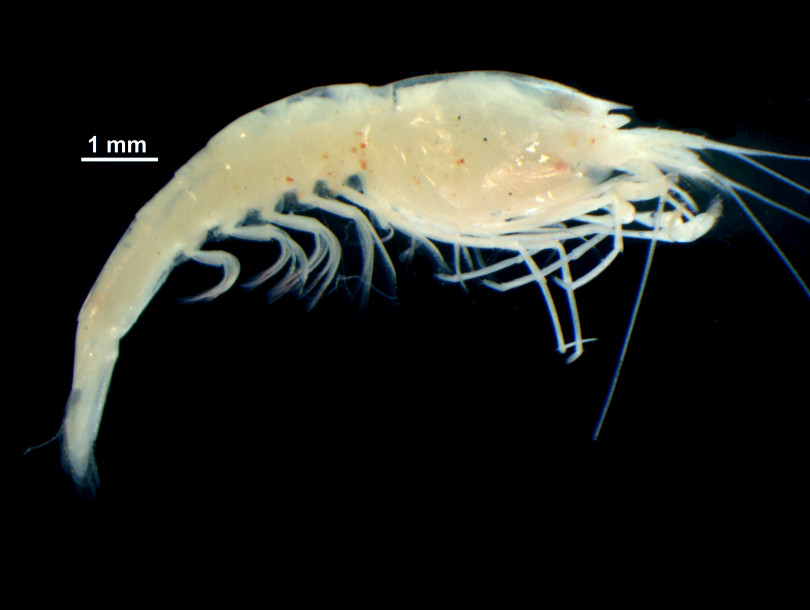
- Stygiocaris stylifera

Scientific classification
- Kingdom: Animalia
- Phylum: Arthropoda
- Class: Malacostraca
- Order: Decapoda
- Suborder: Pleocyemata
- Infraorder: Caridea
- Family: Atyidae
- Genus: Stygiocaris; Holthuis, 1960

Species
- Stygiocaris lancifera Holthuis, 1960; Stygiocaris stylifera Holthuis, 1960

= Stygiocaris =

Genus of crustaceans

Stygiocaris is a genus of shrimp from caves in the North West Cape and Barrow Island, Western Australia.

Stygiocaris is highly troglobitic, being transparent, less than 20 mm (0.8 in) long and with reduced eyes. It was first described by Lipke Holthuis in 1960.

The genus contains two species – Stygiocaris stylifera and Stygiocaris lancifera. S. stylifera is larger than S. lancifera, and also differs in the shape of the rostrum, which is lance-shaped in S. lancifera and constricted at its basal end, but straight and without any constriction in S. stylifera. Other distinguishing features include the shape of the fifth and sixth abdominal somites, and the bases of the antennae.

The two species of Stygiocaris were the first cave shrimp to be reported from Australia, and the type specimens were mostly taken from Kuddumurra Well, from which the fish Milyeringa veritas was described in 1945. The temperature in the well was recorded as 29–30 °C (84–86 °F), and it contained fresh water, but is influenced by the tides.
