= Thomas M. Dykers =

American Rear Admiral

Thomas Michael Dykers
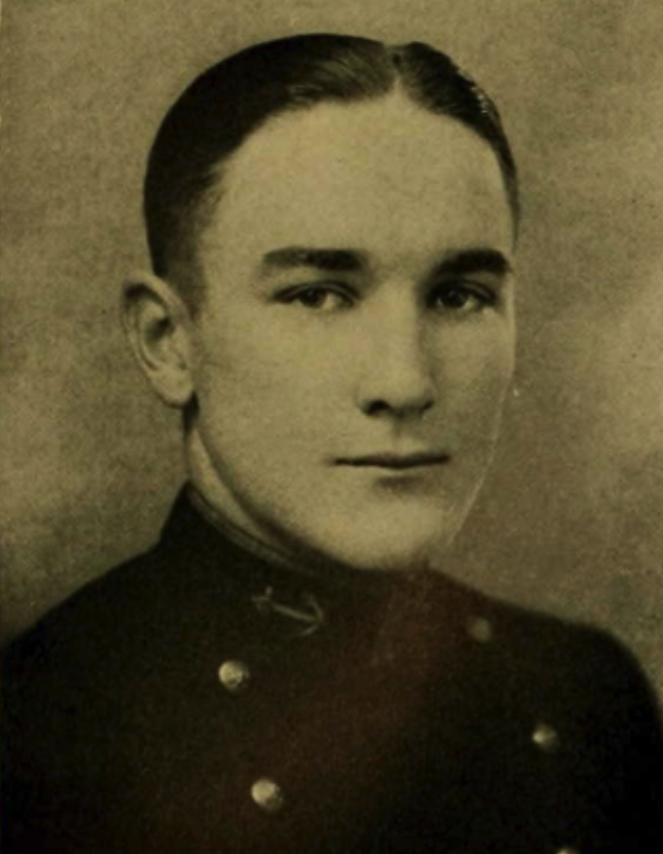
- Born: December 3, 1905; New Orleans, LA
- Died: June 13, 1975 (aged 69); New Orleans, LA
- Burial place: Cypress Grove Cemetery, New Orleans
- Spouse: Margaret Frances Tydings
- Military career
- Allegiance: United States of America
- Branch: United States Navy
- Service years: 1923–1949
- Rank: Rear Admiral
- Commands: USS S-35; USS Jack; Submarine Division 282; Submarine Division 104
- Conflicts: World War II
- Awards: Navy Cross (2); Silver Star; Bronze Star
- Other work: The Silent Service (TV series)

Thomas Michael Dykers, Sr. (December 3, 1905 – June 13, 1975) was a submarine commander during World War II who reached the rank of rear admiral in the United States Navy. He was also a writer and Television producer. He produced and narrated the 1957–58 TV series The Silent Service.

== Early life ==
Dykers was born in 1905 to Reginald and Phoebe Alberta Dykers (née Hall) in New Orleans, Louisiana. He enrolled at Tulane University, where he became a member of Sigma Alpha Epsilon. The following year, he transferred to the United States Naval Academy in Annapolis, Maryland, and graduated in 1927.

== Junior officer ==
After graduating from Annapolis, Dykers served onboard the USS Memphis. In 1930 he completed a course in chemical warfare and was assigned to the USS Bulmer. In 1931 Dykers completed a submarine course in New London, Connecticut, and was subsequently assigned to the USS S-15. In 1934 Dykers completed a submarine commanders course while still assigned to the USS S-15. In 1935 and 1936 Dykers was assigned to the Georgia School of Technology (now the Georgia Institute of Technology) ROTC, where he completed the Naval War College Correspondence Course. In 1937 Dykers was assigned to the USS S-25 (SS-130). In 1938 Dykers took command of the USS S-35 (SS-140).

== World War II ==
Dykers took command of the USS Jack in 1942, as her first commanding officer. The USS Jack subsequently sank eight Japanese ships, and the Navy highly decorated Dykers for his service.

== Later career ==
In 1949 Rear Admiral Dykers retired from the Office of the Chief of Naval Operations and moved to California.

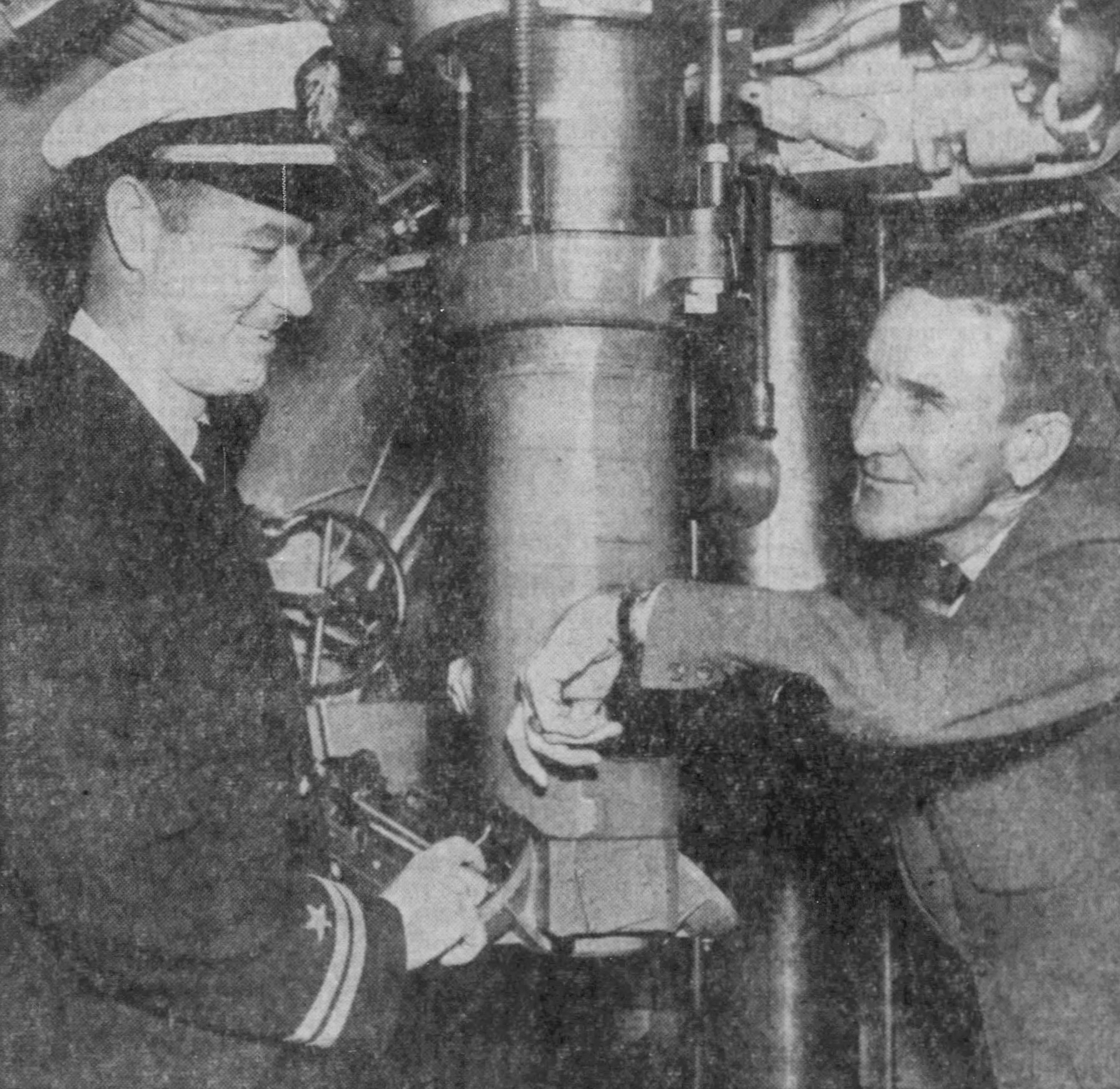
Dykers (right) on the USS Sawfish during production of The Silent Service

There he became a technical advisor for the film industry, aiding in films such as The Flying Missile, Submarine Command, and Torpedo Alley. He later produced and narrated the 1957–58 TV series The Silent Service. The Navy loaned him the USS Sawfish for use in several episodes.
