= Milyeringa veritas =

Conservation status
- Endangered (IUCN 3.1)

Scientific classification
- Kingdom: Animalia
- Phylum: Chordata
- Class: Actinopterygii
- Order: Gobiiformes
- Family: Milyeringidae
- Genus: Milyeringa
- Species: M. veritas

Binomial name
- Milyeringa veritas Whitley, 1945

Synonyms
- Myleringa brooksi Chakrabarty, 2010

Species of fish

Milyeringa veritas (commonly known as the blind gudgeon) is a species of fish in the family Milyeringidae. It is endemic to groundwater and anchialine systems in caves in the Cape Range, Australia. Like other cave-adapted fish, the blind gudgeon is entirely blind and lacks pigmentation, using sensory papillae on its head and body to move around and find food. It has a reduced number of scales on its body and the head is almost scaleless. It reaches a standard length of 5 cm (2.0 in). It is listed as vulnerable under the Australian Environment Protection and Biodiversity Conservation Act 1999. It is an omnivorous species which feeds on algae and possibly also detritus, as well as invertebrates. Invertebrates consumed by M. veritas include Stygiocaris sp., aquatic insect larvae such as those of caddis flies and non aquatic invertebrates which accidentally fall into the water such as isopods, ants and cockroaches. When the gut contents have been sampled 10% of the identifiable gut contents were Stygiocaris and 70% were terrestrial species, despite this species being restricted to caves. They are often observed hanging still in the water column or resting on ledges in the cave walls, behaviours which they also display when kept in aquaria, but can move quickly to avoid capture if threatened, for example when catching them with a net is attempted. The generic name is taken from Milyering which is 20 miles (32 km) southwest of Vlamingh Head in the North West Cape of Western Australia, the type locality, and the specific name is Latin veritas meaning truth an allusion to a quote attributed to the Ancient Greek philosopher Democritus (c.460 — c.370 BC) "Truth lies at the bottom of a well, the depth of which, alas! gives but little hope of release."
