= The Flying Missile =

1950 film by Henry Levin

- original film poster
- Directed by: Henry Levin
- Screenplay by: James Gunn; Richard English
- Story by: Harvey S. Haislip; N. Richard Nash
- Produced by: Jerry Bresler
- Starring: Glenn Ford; Viveca Lindfors; Kenneth Tobey
- Cinematography: William E. Snyder
- Edited by: Viola Lawrence
- Music by: George Duning
- Production company: Columbia Pictures
- Distributed by: Columbia Pictures
- Release date: December 24, 1950
- Running time: 91 minutes
- Country: United States
- Language: English

The Flying Missile is a 1950 black-and-white Cold War-era film from Columbia Pictures starring Glenn Ford and Viveca Lindfors. Produced with the cooperation of the United States Navy, it tells a fictionalized story of the Navy's first submarine-launched cruise missiles, such as the Republic-Ford JB-2 Loon.

== Plot ==
Decorated United States Navy submarine commander William Talbot's submarine USS Bluefin is sailing on maneuvers with the goal of simulating the sinking of the aircraft carrier USS Midway. Midway is transporting a senator to view the test firing of a V-2 rocket from its flight deck. Sighting the carrier, Bluefin simulates a torpedo attack but is detected by a destroyer, which simulates the Bluefin's destruction with a depth-charge attack.

After viewing the successful launching of the V-2 from the surface, Talbot attempts to convince his commanding officer that his attack would have succeeded if the Bluefin had been equipped with a guided missile. The commander reveals that the Navy has been considering the same idea and sends the Bluefin and its crew to the Pacific Missile Test Center at Naval Air Station Point Mugu for a short period of training and familiarization. On the way to the base, Bluefin ruins a fishing net of Lars Hansen's fleet, which fishes in the area when the Navy is not testing its missiles.

The crew of Bluefin are impatient with the training course that they must follow and attempt to accelerate the process and steal their own equipment, but they are thwarted by the tight security at the base. Talbot meets and unsuccessfully attempts to seduce the base commander's secretary Karin Hansen, a Danish native who is the niece of the furious Captain Lars. Talbot obtains the location of needed missile parts from Karin and obtains them for his trial launch. However, Karin loses her job for revealing the information and Talbot's haste in launching a missile from his boat's deck results in his serious injury and the death of his friend, quartermaster "Fuss" Payne.

Talbot becomes depressed, refuses to walk without braces and in danger of being medically discharged. Karin encourages Talbot to take command of Bluefin during a military exercise deploying a submarine flotilla to attack a surface fleet. Talbot conceives the idea for the missile-carrying submarines to launch their missiles but then have them successfully guided to the surface fleet by the nearer submarines originally earmarked for a torpedo attack.

== Cast ==
- Glenn Ford as Cmdr. William A. Talbot
- Viveca Lindfors as Karin Hansen
- Henry O'Neill as RAdm. Thomas A. Scott
- Carl Benton Reid as Dr. Gates, USN
- Joe Sawyer as Quartermaster 'Fuss' Payne
- John Qualen as Lars Hansen
- Anthony Ross as Adm. Bradley
- Harry Shannon as Vice-Adm. Williams
- Ross Ford as Crewman Chuck Davis
- Zachary Charles as Crewman Mack
- Jerry Paris as Crewman Andy Mason
- Kenneth Tobey as Crewman Pete McElvoy
- Paul Harvey as Gen. Benton
- Richard Quine as Airman Hank Weber
- John Dehner as Lieutenant Commander

== Production ==
As the film's subject matter was considered restricted, no previous films depicting United States Navy cruise-missile development in the immediate postwar era had been produced. As indicated in the film's opening credits, location photography on naval bases, aircraft carriers, surface fleet ships and submarines took place with the full cooperation of the armed forces. Both Navy and Army installations were made available to the producers.

Rear Admiral Thomas M. Dykers served as the technical director for The Flying Missile. After a long career in the Navy as a submarine commander, Dykers retired and moved to California in 1949. He later served as a technical advisor for other films such as Submarine Command (1951), and Torpedo Alley (1952), and he produced and narrated the 1957–58 television series The Silent Service.

The USS Cusk was filmed for exterior shots of the fictitious Bluefin.

== Reception ==
In a contemporary review for The New York Times, critic A. H. Weiler called The Flying Missile "strangely hackneyed fare" and wrote: "Its technical dialogue and shots of the newest implements of destruction may be novel but the story, as unfolded in this arrival from Columbia's studios, adheres closely to an obvious formula, a blueprint that is hardly inspirational. ... It is the tale of the luckless hero who runs the length of the field at the last minute to win the game for his alma mater. ... As the commander, Glenn Ford is both a serious and busy gent but little else. His role, aside from a bit of tortured climactic emoting, merely calls for him to rush about having ideas, getting or filching equipment and, finally, being the vindicated hero."
