= Shire of Exmouth =

Coordinates: 21°55′59″S 114°07′41″E

- Local government area
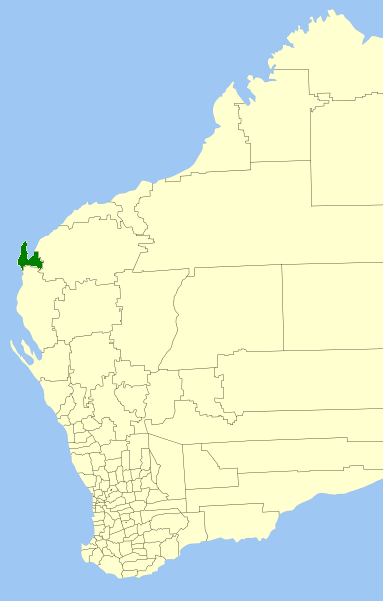
- Location in Western Australia

- Interactive map of Shire of Exmouth
- Country: Australia
- State: Western Australia
- Region: Gascoyne
- Established: 1964
- Council seat: Exmouth

Government
  - Shire President: Matt Niikkula
  - State electorate: North West
  - Federal division: Durack

Area
  - Total: 6,502.8 km^{2} (2,510.7 sq mi)

Population
  - Total: 3,085 (LGA 2021)
- Website: Shire of Exmouth
LGAs around Shire of Exmouth
Indian Ocean	Indian Ocean	Ashburton
Indian Ocean	Shire of Exmouth	Ashburton
Indian Ocean	Carnarvon	Ashburton

The Shire of Exmouth is a local government area in the Gascoyne region of Western Australia, about 1,000 kilometres (600 mi) north of the state capital, Perth. The Shire covers an area of 6,503 square kilometres (2,511 sq mi), and its seat of government is the town of Exmouth.

== History ==
The Shire of Exmouth was formed on 1 January 1964 by splitting from the Shire of Carnarvon. The original council had five members.

== Wards ==
The shire was not divided into wards and the seven councillors sit at large.

== Towns and localities ==
The towns and localities of the Shire of Exmouth with population and size figures based on the most recent Australian census:

Suburb	Population	Area	Map
Cape Range National Park ‡	18 (SAL 2021)	503 km^{2} (194 sq mi)	
Exmouth	2,806 (SAL 2021)	50.7 km^{2} (19.6 sq mi)	
Exmouth Gulf	49 (SAL 2021)	4,934.3 km^{2} (1,905.1 sq mi)	
Learmonth	25 (SAL 2021)	334.4 km^{2} (129.1 sq mi)	
Ningaloo	7 (SAL 2021)	531.8 km^{2} (205.3 sq mi)	
North West Cape	177 (SAL 2021)	298.6 km^{2} (115.3 sq mi)	

- ( ‡ indicates boundaries of national park and locality are not identical)

== Heritage-listed places ==
As of 2024, 38 places are heritage-listed in the Shire of Exmouth, of which six are on the State Register of Heritage Places, among them the Vlamingh Head Lighthouse.
