= James F. Calvert =

United States Navy admiral (1920–2009)

James Francis Calvert
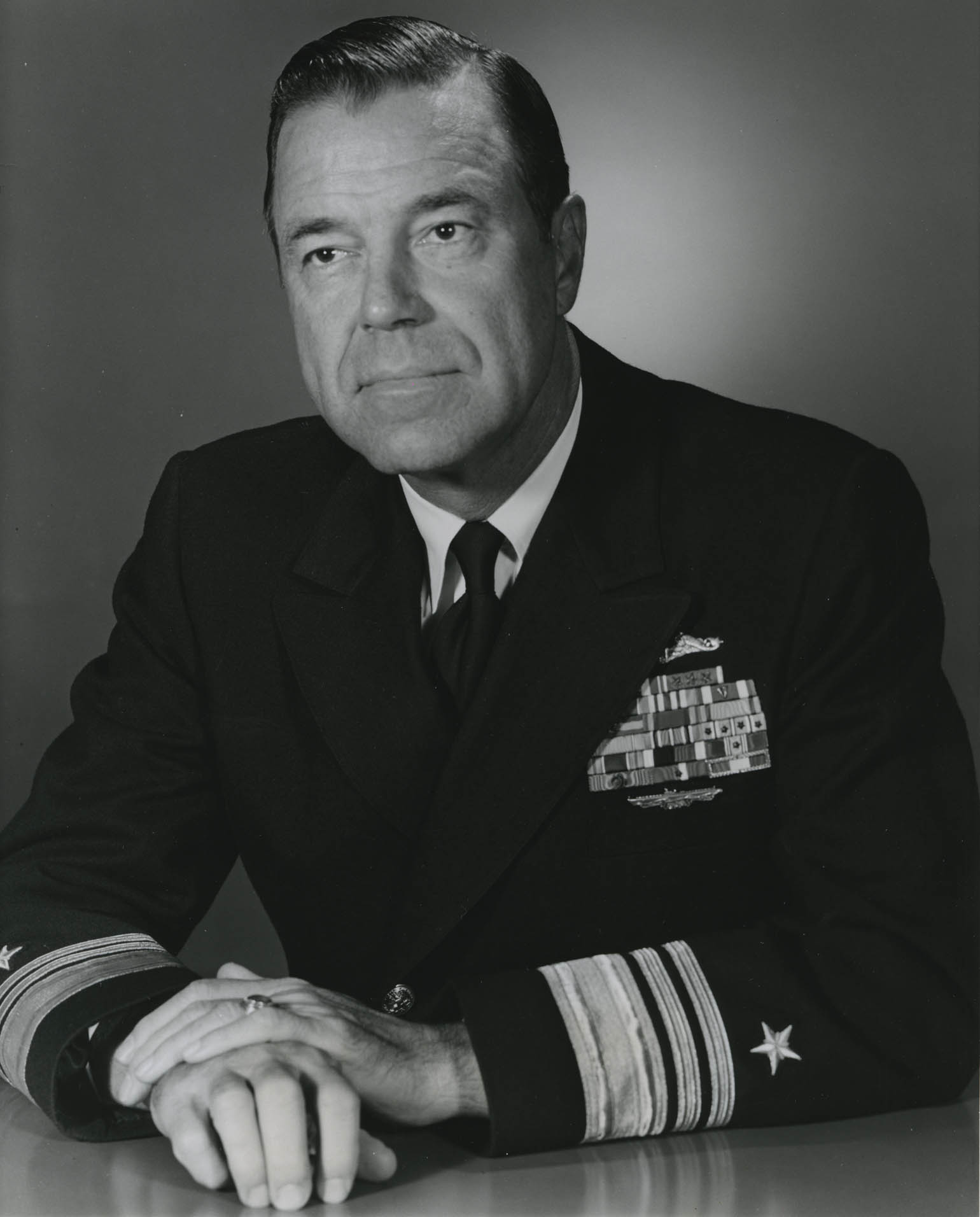
- Born: September 8, 1920; Cleveland, Ohio, US
- Died: June 3, 2009 (aged 88); Bryn Mawr, Pennsylvania, US
- Military career
- Allegiance: United States of America
- Branch: United States Navy
- Service years: 1942–1973
- Rank: Vice Admiral
- Commands: USS Trigger (SS-564); USS Skate (SSN-578)
- Conflicts: World War II
- Awards: Silver Star (x2); Bronze Star Medal

James Francis Calvert (September 8, 1920 – June 3, 2009) served in the United States Navy, where he commanded USS Skate, the third nuclear submarine commissioned and the second submarine to reach the North Pole, which became the first to surface at the pole. Skate surfaced at the North Pole on March 17, 1959 to commit the ashes of the famed explorer Sir Hubert Wilkins to the Arctic waste. He later served as the 46th superintendent of the United States Naval Academy.

== Biography ==
=== Early life and education ===
Calvert was born on September 8, 1920, in Cleveland, and grew up as an only child. He attended Oberlin College for two years before receiving an appointment to the United States Naval Academy. He graduated on June 19, 1942, completing his coursework at the Naval Academy in three years under an accelerated wartime curriculum.

=== Military service ===
He was assigned to attend the Naval Submarine School at the Naval Submarine Base New London and was given a post on the Gato-class submarine USS Jack, where he served for three years. On Jack, Calvert was responsible for operating the Torpedo Data Computer, an electromechanical analog computer used for torpedo fire-control, and the ships on which he served sank 100,000 tons of enemy ships and damaged an additional 18,000 tons. He was awarded two Silver Stars and two Bronze Star Medals, along with a Letter of Commendation. He was assigned in 1945 to serve as executive officer of USS Haddo, on which he served one war patrol. He was on Haddo in Tokyo Bay during ceremonies for the Japanese surrender.

After the end of World War II, Calvert spent three years at the Submarine School as an instructor in the Torpedo Data Computer. He was assigned to serve as executive officer on USS Charr, winning a battle efficiency pennant in both of his years of service on the ship. He was assigned as executive officer of the Tang-class submarine USS Harder when it was commissioned in 1952 and later became commanding officer of USS Trigger, another Tang-class boat. After training by the Atomic Energy Commission, Calvert was assigned to USS Skate, the Navy's third nuclear-powered submarine and the first to be designed for assembly line construction rather than as a one-off prototype.

Although Skate first surfaced at the pole on March 17, 1959, Skate first went under the North Pole on August 11, 1958. In 1958 Skate was able to surface in the Arctic, but was unable to surface at the pole itself due to the thickness of the ice. The ability to travel under and break through the ice was a major achievement during the Cold War as it allows the Navy's submarines to avoid detection under the ice while being able to launch their Polaris missiles from points far closer to the Soviet Union. The following year, after traveling 3,000 miles (4,800 km) to the pole in 12 days, Skate became the first submarine to surface through the ice when it reached the North Pole on March 17, 1959. There they released the ashes of Australian polar explorer Sir George Hubert Wilkins who died in November 1958 and who had been the first to try to reach the pole by submarine; Wilkins had flown over the pole but was never able to set foot there despite numerous attempts.

With the support of Admiral Hyman G. Rickover, Calvert rose to vice admiral. He was named as superintendent of the United States Naval Academy in 1968, where he introduced 20 different majors to midshipmen to replace a standardized curriculum of military courses that had previously been taken there. His final posting before retirement was as the last commander of the United States First Fleet, before its disestablishment in 1973.

Among the four books he wrote were Silent Running: My Years on a World War II Attack Submarine and the 1960 book Surface at the Pole: The Extraordinary Voyages of the U.S.S. Skate in which he described his experiences at the pole, reminiscing about a polar bear that went into the water, ignoring the submarine nearby.

He appeared as himself on the June 11, 1957 episode of the CBS television panel show To Tell The Truth.

=== Personal ===
His first marriage, to the Nancy Ridgeway King, ended with her death in 1965. Their daughter, Margaret, died in 1994. Calvert died at age 88 on June 3, 2009, at his home in Bryn Mawr, Pennsylvania due to heart failure. He was survived by his second wife, Margaretta Harrison Battle, whom he married in 1968. He was also survived by two sons from his first marriage, four stepsons and 15 grandchildren.
