= Barrow Island (Western Australia) =

Island off the coast of Western Australia

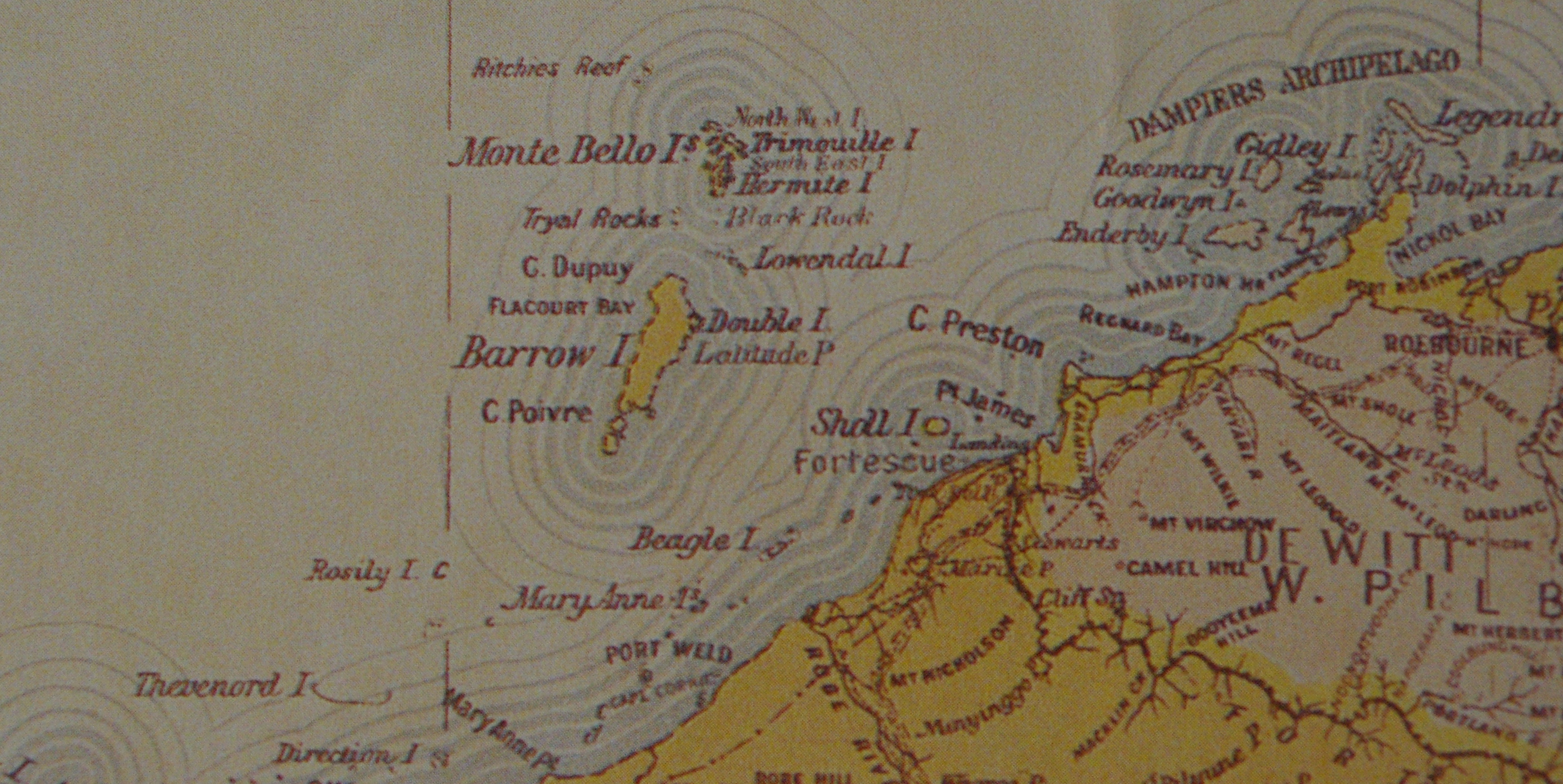
- Barrow Island from an 1897 map, showing the Australian mainland on the bottom right (south-east) and the Montebello Islands to the north
- Barrow Island (Western Australia)
- Location within Western Australia

Geography
- Location: Indian Ocean, off the Pilbara coast of Western Australia
- Coordinates: 20°48′S 115°23′E
- Area: 202 km^{2} (78 sq mi)
- Length: 27 km (16.8 mi)
- Width: 11.5 km (7.15 mi)
- Coastline: 72 km (44.7 mi)

Administration
- Australia
- State: Western Australia

Demographics
- Population: 45 (SAL 2021)

Barrow Island is a 202-square-kilometre (78 sq mi) island 50 kilometres (31 mi) northwest off the Pilbara coast of Western Australia. The island is the second largest in Western Australia after Dirk Hartog Island.

== Early history and European discovery ==
The island was visited by Indigenous Australians approximately 4,000 or more years ago. It separated from the mainland approximately 6,800 years ago. Stone artefacts including several weathered flakes and fragments made of igneous and metamorphic rocks and chert were collected from Barrow Island in the 1960s. Thevenard Island also has evidence of Aboriginal visitation, and it is likely that the nearby Montebello Islands were utilized as well; however, there have been no archaeological finds from these islands.

Navigators had noted its existence since the early 17th century, and Nicholas Baudin sighted it in 1803, mistakenly believing it to be part of mainland Australia. Phillip Parker King named the island in 1816 after Sir John Barrow, a Secretary of the Admiralty and founder of the Royal Geographical Society.

Whalers were known to operate in the area from about 1800 onwards. The first recorded visit by whalers was in 1842 with continued visits occurring until 1864. The island was used as a slave trading centre for Aboriginal Australians during the 1870s by Captain William Cadell until he was arrested and removed from the colony in 1876. Slave labour was used in the nearby mainland pearling industry.

Guano, seabirds or bats' excrement that is a highly effective fertilizer, was found on the island and mining began in 1883. It was mined for the remainder of the 1880s and sold to markets in Perth.

== Environment ==
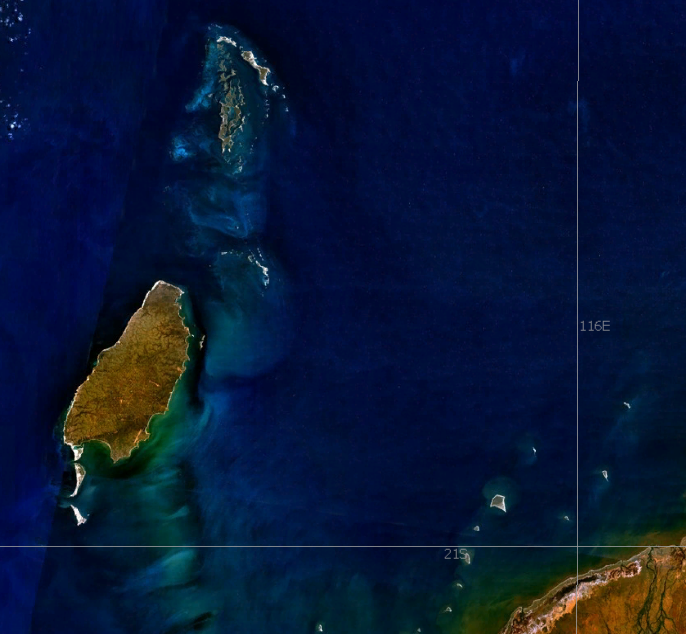
NASA World Wind image

Barrow Island is noted for its flat spinifex grasslands spotted with termite mounds. While the main feature of Barrow Island's geography is the undulating limestone uplands, the island is surrounded by a mixture of sandy beaches and rocky shores, low cliffs, dunes, salt flats, and reefs.

Due to its isolation from mainland Australia and protection afforded under its statutory status, Barrow Island is one of the most important conservation reserves in Western Australia. It is an "A-class" reserve, the highest level of conservation protection available for Crown land in Australia. Once a national park or class A nature reserve is made, mining leases and general purpose leases cannot be granted over them without the consent of both Houses of Parliament, and actual mining cannot take place within them without specific permission of the Minister for Environment. This occurred in 2003, when a portion of the reserve was excised to facilitate the Gorgon gas project.

The island is known for its diversity of mammalian fauna, including several species now extinct or greatly reduced on mainland Australia. Thirteen mammal species exist on the island, including the spectacled hare-wallaby, burrowing bettong, golden bandicoot, black-flanked rock-wallaby, Barrow Island euro and Barrow Island mouse (Pseudomys nanus ferculinus). The island is also home to 43 species of terrestrial reptiles including a variety of dragons, legless lizards, geckos, skinks, snakes and monitors. The most recognisable of these is probably the perentie, Australia's biggest lizard and the island's top predator. The island represents important turtle nesting habitat for the green turtle and flatback sea turtle.

Some exotic species exist on the island (e.g. the American cockroach) but the island fauna is largely intact. Black rats (Rattus rattus) were discovered to have established in 1990, but were eradicated by the Department of Conservation and Land Management. Current threats include invasive species (including weeds, feral cats, common house gecko, etc.) establishing on the island, clearing for development, fire and disease.

Limestone caves on Barrow Island support subterranean ecological communities. These include endemic and vulnerable species. Invertebrate species include stygofauna, amphipod crustaceans, of Nedsia, Liagoceradocus and other genera. These mostly inhabit an anchialine system, a "lens" of fresh water above the saline ground water, which they share with cave fish species such as the blind cave eel (Ophisternon candidum), and two blind cave gudgeons, Milyeringa veritas and Milyeringa justitia. Troglofauna have also been discovered within the cave systems; these include the schizomid Draculoides bramstokeri and perhaps the only troglobitic reptile—Anilios longissimus. Hydrogen sulphide produced by the "Barrow fault" may sustain this diverse community through chemoautotrophic energy production.

=== Birds ===
Barrow Island has been classified by BirdLife International as an Important Bird Area. Birds include the Barrow Island black-and-white fairy-wren (Malurus leucopterus edouardi), an endemic subspecies of the white-winged fairy-wren, which is regarded as vulnerable to extinction. The island also supports over 1% of the world populations of grey-tailed tattler, red-necked stint, pied oystercatcher, and fairy tern, as well as an isolated population of the spinifexbird.

== Conservation ==
The Western Shield project has sought to reduce the impact of introduced species to the region. Corporate and state government cooperation on programs has produced studies into the little-known subterranean fauna of the island.

== Energy reserves ==
=== Oil ===
Oil was discovered on the island in commercial quantities in 1964 by West Australian Petroleum, and the first oil field was established in 1967. In 1995, there were 430 wells producing oil and natural gas across most of the southern half of the island. The site has been Australia's leading producer of oil.

Oil tankers are filled by a submarine pipeline that extends 10 kilometres (6.2 mi) offshore. West Australian Petroleum established a 200-room apartment complex for workers on the island. Barrow Island Airport was established to transport workers and equipment from Karratha and Perth.

=== Gas ===
In December 2009, a development consortium of Chevron, ExxonMobil and Shell received environmental approvals from the Government of Western Australia to develop natural gas reserves 60 kilometres (37 mi) north of the island. Known as the Gorgon gas project, it was completed in 2017, offering an estimated 1,100 cubic kilometres (40 trillion cubic feet) of gas, making it one of Australia's largest developments.

== Climate ==
Barrow Island has a hot desert climate (Köppen: BWh) with very hot, humid summers with highly variable rainfall, and warm, dry winters.

Climate data for Barrow Island Airport (20º52'S, 115º25'E, 6 m AMSL) (1999-2024 and extremes)
Month	Jan	Feb	Mar	Apr	May	Jun	Jul	Aug	Sep	Oct	Nov	Dec	Year
Record high °C (°F)	45.0 (113.0)	41.2 (106.2)	40.6 (105.1)	38.2 (100.8)	33.8 (92.8)	30.9 (87.6)	29.2 (84.6)	33.3 (91.9)	36.0 (96.8)	39.5 (103.1)	40.0 (104.0)	42.4 (108.3)	45.0 (113.0)
Mean daily maximum °C (°F)	33.2 (91.8)	33.7 (92.7)	33.5 (92.3)	31.3 (88.3)	27.5 (81.5)	24.3 (75.7)	23.8 (74.8)	25.2 (77.4)	27.2 (81.0)	29.6 (85.3)	30.6 (87.1)	32.3 (90.1)	29.4 (84.8)
Mean daily minimum °C (°F)	25.8 (78.4)	26.3 (79.3)	26.6 (79.9)	24.6 (76.3)	21.3 (70.3)	18.8 (65.8)	17.5 (63.5)	17.9 (64.2)	19.7 (67.5)	21.8 (71.2)	23.0 (73.4)	24.5 (76.1)	22.3 (72.2)
Record low °C (°F)	21.0 (69.8)	21.5 (70.7)	21.0 (69.8)	19.0 (66.2)	14.3 (57.7)	12.8 (55.0)	11.8 (53.2)	12.2 (54.0)	14.7 (58.5)	16.0 (60.8)	18.0 (64.4)	19.8 (67.6)	11.8 (53.2)
Average precipitation mm (inches)	20.7 (0.81)	43.2 (1.70)	53.3 (2.10)	34.1 (1.34)	60.1 (2.37)	34.7 (1.37)	13.1 (0.52)	3.5 (0.14)	1.2 (0.05)	1.6 (0.06)	1.5 (0.06)	6.1 (0.24)	271.3 (10.68)
Average precipitation days (≥ 1.0 mm)	2.0	2.3	2.4	1.5	2.6	1.9	1.0	0.6	0.2	0.2	0.2	0.6	15.5
Average afternoon relative humidity (%)	58	59	59	53	55	56	58	52	51	51	52	54	55
Average dew point °C (°F)	21.9 (71.4)	22.7 (72.9)	22.5 (72.5)	18.8 (65.8)	16.7 (62.1)	14.3 (57.7)	14.1 (57.4)	13.4 (56.1)	14.4 (57.9)	16.2 (61.2)	17.7 (63.9)	19.8 (67.6)	17.7 (63.9)
Source: Bureau of Meteorology

== Highest wind record ==
The World Meteorological Organization established Barrow Island as the location of the highest non-tornadic wind gust ever recorded, at 408 km/h (254 mph). The gust occurred on 10 April 1996, during Severe Tropical Cyclone Olivia. The previous record was a 372 km/h (231 mph) gust at Mount Washington, New Hampshire, United States in April 1934.

== See also ==
- List of islands of Western Australia
- Petroleum industry in Western Australia
