= USS Jack (SS-259) =

Submarine of the United States

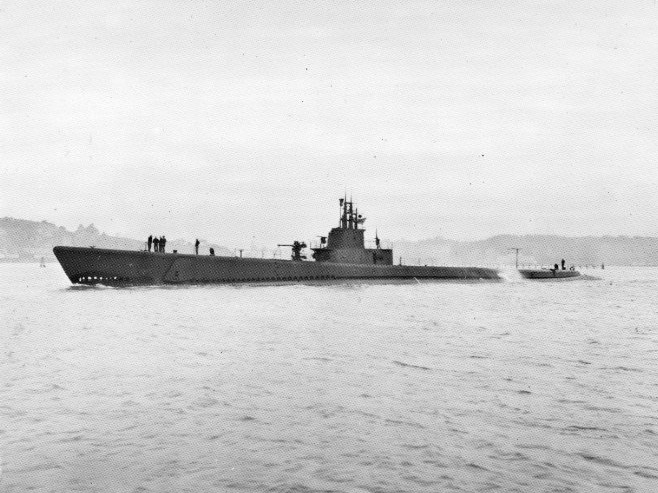
- Jack (SS-259) underway off Mare Island California, 17 December 1943.

History

United States
- Name: USS Jack
- Builder: Electric Boat Company, Groton, Connecticut
- Laid down: 2 February 1942
- Launched: 16 October 1942
- Sponsored by: Mrs. Frances Seely
- Commissioned: 6 January 1943
- Decommissioned: 8 June 1946
- Recommissioned: 20 December 1957
- Decommissioned: 21 April 1958
- Stricken: 1 September 1967
- Identification: SS-259
- Fate: Transferred to Greece, 21 April 1958

Greece
- Name: Amfitriti
- Acquired: 21 April 1958
- Identification: S-17
- Fate: Returned to the U.S. Navy, 1967 and sunk as a target 5 September 1967

General characteristics
- Class & type: Gato-class diesel-electric submarine
- Displacement: 1,525 long tons (1,549 t) surfaced; 2,424 long tons (2,463 t) submerged
- Length: 311 ft 9 in (95.02 m)
- Beam: 27 ft 3 in (8.31 m)
- Draft: 17 ft 0 in (5.18 m) maximum
- Propulsion: 4 × Hooven-Owens-Rentschler (H.O.R.) diesel engines driving electrical generators; 2 × 126-cell Sargo batteries; 4 × high-speed Allis-Chalmers electric motors with reduction gears; two propellers; 5,400 shp (4.0 MW) surfaced; 2,740 shp (2.0 MW) submerged
- Speed: 21 kn (39 km/h) surfaced; 9 kn (17 km/h) submerged
- Range: 11,000 nmi (20,000 km) surfaced at 10 kn (19 km/h)
- Endurance: 48 hours at 2 knots (4 km/h) submerged; 75 days on patrol
- Test depth: 300 ft (90 m)
- Complement: 6 officers, 54 enlisted
- Armament: 10 × 21-inch (533 mm) torpedo tubes; 6 forward, 4 aft; 24 torpedoes; 1 × 3-inch (76 mm) / 50 caliber deck gun; Bofors 40 mm and Oerlikon 20 mm cannon

USS Jack (SS-259), a Gato-class submarine, was the first ship of the United States Navy to be named for the jack (any of various fishes—young pike, green pike or pickerel, or large California rockfish).

== Construction and commissioning ==
Jack′s keel was laid down by the Electric Boat Company at Groton, Connecticut, on 2 February 1942. She was launched on 16 October 1942, sponsored by Mrs. Frances Seely, and commissioned at Naval Submarine Base New London in New London, Connecticut, on 6 January 1943, Commander Thomas. M. "Tommy" Dykers in command.

== Service history ==
=== First and second war patrols, June – October 1943 ===
Jack underwent shakedown training along the New England coast, sailing from New London 26 April 1943 for service in the Pacific. Reaching Pearl Harbor 21 May, the submarine took on supplies and departed on her first offensive war patrol 5 June 1943. Taking part in the submarine offensive against Japan, she patrolled off Honshū. Jack came upon a five-ship convoy 26 June, and in a series of five well-executed attacks, sank the 4,000-ton passenger/cargo ship Toyo Maru and the 6,000-ton cargo ship Shozan Maru. In attempting to torpedo a third ship, the submarine was shaken by a bomb dropped by an airplane, but the alert crew corrected her dangerous diving angle and effected repairs.

On 4 July 1943, Jack began to track smoke on the horizon and soon detected Nikkyo Maru with an escort. The submarine used three torpedoes to send the cargo ship to the bottom, and returned to Pearl Harbor for repairs 19 July 1943. This patrol is dramatized in the 1950s TV series, The Silent Service (S01 E01), produced by Universal Television and hosted by Tommy Dykers.

Jack's second war patrol (5 September–10 October 1943) brought no opportunities for attack as engineering difficulties forced her to return prematurely to Pearl Harbor. During her subsequent stay in Hawaii, an Allied tanker mistook her for a Japanese submarine and opened gunfire on her in the Pacific Ocean northeast of Hawaii at 23°20′N 154°30′W on 1 January 1944.

=== Third war patrol, January – March 1944 ===
On her third war patrol, the submarine proceeded westward from Pearl Harbor 16 January 1944 bound for the South China Sea. Prowling the pivotal Singapore-Japan shipping lanes, she encountered convoy Hi-40 of five large oil tankers with three escorts early 19 February. The submarine reached attack position at about 04:40 and fired three torpedoes, scoring one hit. She then began an "end around," a long circling maneuver designed to bring her in front of the remaining four tankers, and late that afternoon she was again ready to attack. Two torpedoes sank two more of the frantically zigzagging ships, and Jack moved in on the trailing tanker. Her first spread of torpedoes missed and the tanker replied with a salvo from 5-inch (130 mm) guns, but Jack returned three hours later to sink her with four torpedoes. In this remarkable series of attacks, the submarine sank four tankers (earning the nickname "Jack the Pack", after the convoy commander radioed that he was under attack from a "wolfpack"), all over 5,000 tons: Kokuie Maru, Nanei Maru, Nichirin Maru, and Ichiyo Maru. After several more attacks Jack set course for Fremantle, Australia, her new base, where she arrived 13 March 1944.

=== Fourth and fifth war patrols, April – July 1944 ===
Departing Australia 6 April 1944, Jack returned to the South China Sea for her fourth war patrol. She chased the Take Ichi convoy through the afternoon of 25 April, and shortly after midnight next day attacked, sinking Yoshida Maru No. 1 and damaging two others. Jack also used her deck gun to sink a radio-equipped trawler, Daisun, 27 April before returning to Fremantle 10 May 1944.

Jack left Fremantle for her fifth war patrol 4 June 1944, again returning to Japan's important lifelines in the South China Sea. Early 24 June she made an approach on a large convoy and fired three torpedoes, sinking a large tanker, San Pedro Maru, before escorting aircraft forced her to retire. Five days later the submarine came upon another large convoy, and by early 30 June was in position. Three successive attacks sent cargo ships Matsukawa Maru and Tsukushima Maru to the bottom. Jack returned to Fremantle 14 July 1944. For her highly successful and aggressive first, third, and fifth war patrols, the submarine was awarded the coveted Presidential Unit Citation.

=== Sixth and seventh war patrols, August – December 1944 ===
The submarine sailed from Fremantle 6 August 1944 to the Celebes Sea for her sixth war patrol. Attacking a convoy 29 August, she sank a small minesweeper (Minesweeper No 28) and started in pursuit of a cargo ship. After her torpedo missed and she was raked with gunfire by her adversary, Jack deftly evaded the attacker and returned later to sink Mexico Maru. Jack arrived at Fremantle following this patrol 24 September 1944.

She departed Fremantle once more 27 October 1944, bound for the South China Sea. She attacked a coastal convoy 14–15 November, sinking cargo ships Nichiei Maru and Yusan Maru before shallow water forced her to break off the fight. The attrition of Japanese shipping was beginning to tell, and Jack found no more opportunities before ending her patrol at Pearl Harbor 24 December 1944. From there she returned to San Francisco for a major overhaul.

=== Eighth and ninth war patrols, April – August 1945 ===
The veteran submarine returned to Pearl Harbor 1 April 1945, and departed on her eighth war patrol 26 April 1945. With most Japanese shipping sunk or reluctant to venture into the sea lanes, her major job was to act as lifeguard for the massive carrier strikes and bomber missions against the Japanese mainland. The submarine returned to Guam for refit 18 June and set out again 12 July for her ninth and last war patrol. Stationed between Luzon and Okinawa, she again performed lifeguard duty until the Japanese surrender 15 August 1945. Her ninth patrol ended at Midway Atoll 29 August.

=== Greek service ===
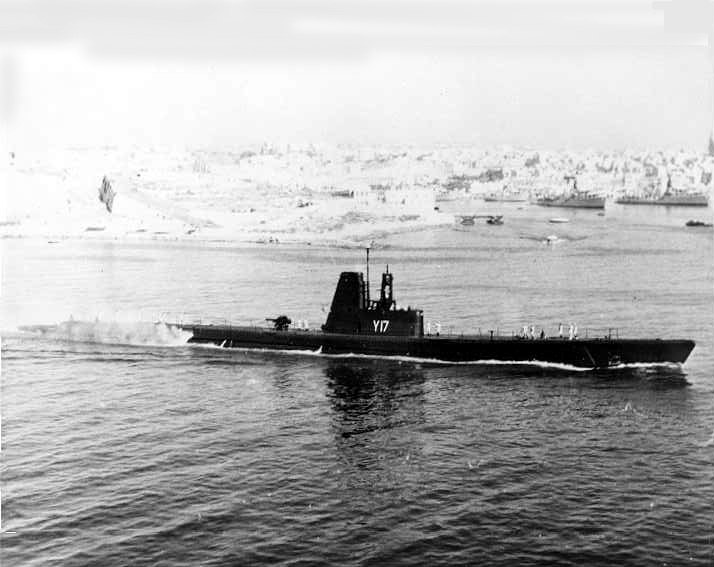
Jack as Amfitriti (S-17) in August 1961.

Jack sailed for the United States 5 September 1945, steaming via Pearl Harbor and the Canal Zone to New York 3 October 1945. She decommissioned at Atlantic Reserve Fleet, New London 8 June 1946, and was placed in the Atlantic Reserve Fleet. She recommissioned briefly 20 December 1957, to prepare for transfer to the government of Greece and after training operations was loaned to the Royal Hellenic Navy 21 April 1958. She served as Amfitriti (S-17) (also spelled Amphitriti), until 1967, when she was returned by Greece and sunk as a target by the US 6th Fleet, 5 September 1967, in the Mediterranean Sea.

== Awards ==
Jack was credited with sinking 76,687 tons of Japanese shipping. In addition to her Presidential Unit Citation (US), Jack received seven battle stars for World War II service. All patrols, except for her second and ninth, were designated successful.

== In culture ==
Jack is the subject of the series premiere of the syndicated television anthology series The Silent Service. The episode, entitled "The Jack at Tokyo," aired 5 Apr 1957 and was hosted by Rear Admiral Thomas M. Dykers (ret).

Jack's operations during the Pacific War are chronicled in Silent Running: My Years on a World War II Attack Submarine.

== See also ==
- List of most successful American submarines in World War II

== Bibliography ==
- Hinman, Charles R., and Douglas E. Campbell. The Submarine Has No Friends: Friendly Fire Incidents Involving U.S. Submarines During World War II. Syneca Research Group, Inc., 2019. ISBN 978-0-359-76906-3.
- Wright, C. C. (2005). "Question 17/03: Replacement of US Submarine Diesel Engines". Warship International. XLII (4): 431–434. ISSN 0043-0374.
