= Exmouth, Western Australia =

Exmouth Ningaloo
- Town
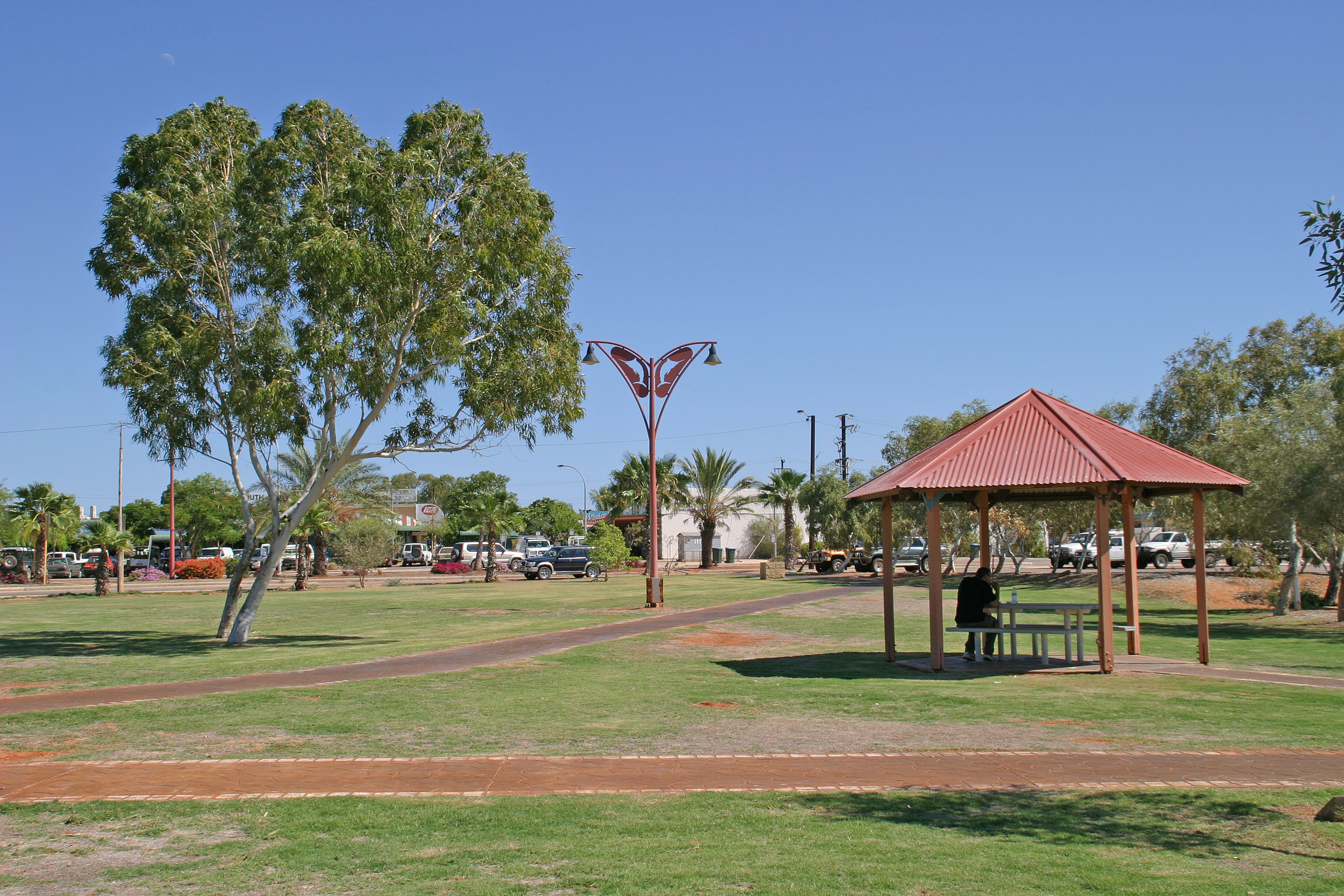
- Main park c. 2007
- Interactive map of Exmouth
- Coordinates: 21°55′59″S 114°7′41″E
- Country: Australia
- State: Western Australia
- LGA: Shire of Exmouth
- Location: 1,264 km (785 mi) N of Perth; 539 km (335 mi) SW of Karratha; 366 km (227 mi) N of Carnarvon
- Established: 1964

Government
  - State electorate: Pilbara
  - Federal division: Durack

Area
  - Total: 50.7 km^{2} (19.6 sq mi)
- Elevation: 15 m (49 ft)

Population
  - Total: 2,806 (SAL 2021)
- Postcode: 6707

Exmouth (/ˈɛksmaʊθ/ EX-mowth (Note: According to British conventions of pronunciation, as applied in the cases, eg, of Bournemouth, Falmouth, Plymouth, and Portsmouth, England, the pronunciation of Exmouth, Western Australia, would be /ˈɛksməθ/ (EX-muth), as for its namesake, Exmouth, England. However, the local pronunciation of Exmouth, Western Australia, is /ˈɛksmaʊθ/ (EX-mowth).), Dhalandji: Ningaloo) is a town on the tip of the North West Cape and on Exmouth Gulf in Western Australia, 1,124 kilometres (698 mi) north of the state capital Perth and 2,060 kilometres (1,280 mi) southwest of Darwin.

The town was established in 1964 to support the nearby United States Naval Communication Station Harold E. Holt, which was commissioned in 1967. It is named after Exmouth Gulf. Beginning in the late 1970s, the town began hosting United States Air Force personnel assigned to Learmonth Solar Observatory, a defence science facility jointly operated with Australia's Ionospheric Prediction Service. The town is served by Learmonth Airport.

== History ==
In 1618, Dutch East India Company ship Mauritius, under command of Willem Janszoon, landed near North West Cape, just proximate to what would be Exmouth, and named Willem's River, which was later renamed Ashburton River.

The location was first used as a military base in World War II. US Admiral James F. Calvert in his memoir, Silent Running: My Years on a World War II Attack Submarine, and US Vice Admiral Charles A. Lockwood in Sink 'Em All, his narrative of Allied submarine warfare, describe its history. After the retreat from Java in March 1942, Allied naval forces required a forward base for replenishing submarines, then the sole form of offensive warfare against the Japanese. Both Darwin, and Broome, were too exposed to air attack, so a 500-ton unmotorized lighter was placed as a refueling barge near the mouth of Exmouth Gulf, where the Allies were already maintaining a seaplane tender.

Code-named "Potshot", the spartan base was also developed as a submarine advanced base and rest camp using the tender USS Pelias. An airfield (now RAAF Learmonth) was constructed to provide fighter defense for the base. Z Special Unit used Potshot as a staging base for Operation Jaywick, a raid on Japanese shipping in Singapore Harbour, in September 1943.

Writing of a fishing trip which he undertook in Exmouth with politician Bob Hawke, British businessman Alistair McAlpine (1942–2014), wrote of the town in his memoir:

Exmouth is on a bleak peninsula of land halway up the western Australian coast. I say 'bleak' because not many people live there and certainly no Aboriginals for they believe the land to be cursed. They may be right for when the volcano Krakatoa exploded over a century ago, Exmouth was submerged by the resulting tidal wave. Regenerated by the need for an American Air Force base and its contingent airfield, Exmouth acquired a number of brick homes and a reputation for having the best fishing in Australia. The Australian tourist industry ignored this place for many years, but then the Australian tourist industry had for many years ignored tourists.

In 2008, an emergency landing of the flight Qantas 72 was made at the nearby Learmonth Airport / RAAF Base Learmonth. The A330 had an incident involving the ADIRU which confused AoA (Angle of Attack) data with altitude data, making the plane think it was in a 16° pitch up when it was flying level. So the protection measures on the plane forced a 16° pitch down twice and brought negative G-forces on all passengers and it made them float for about 15 seconds. There were no deaths, but 1 crew member and 11 passengers suffered serious injuries.

== Tourism ==
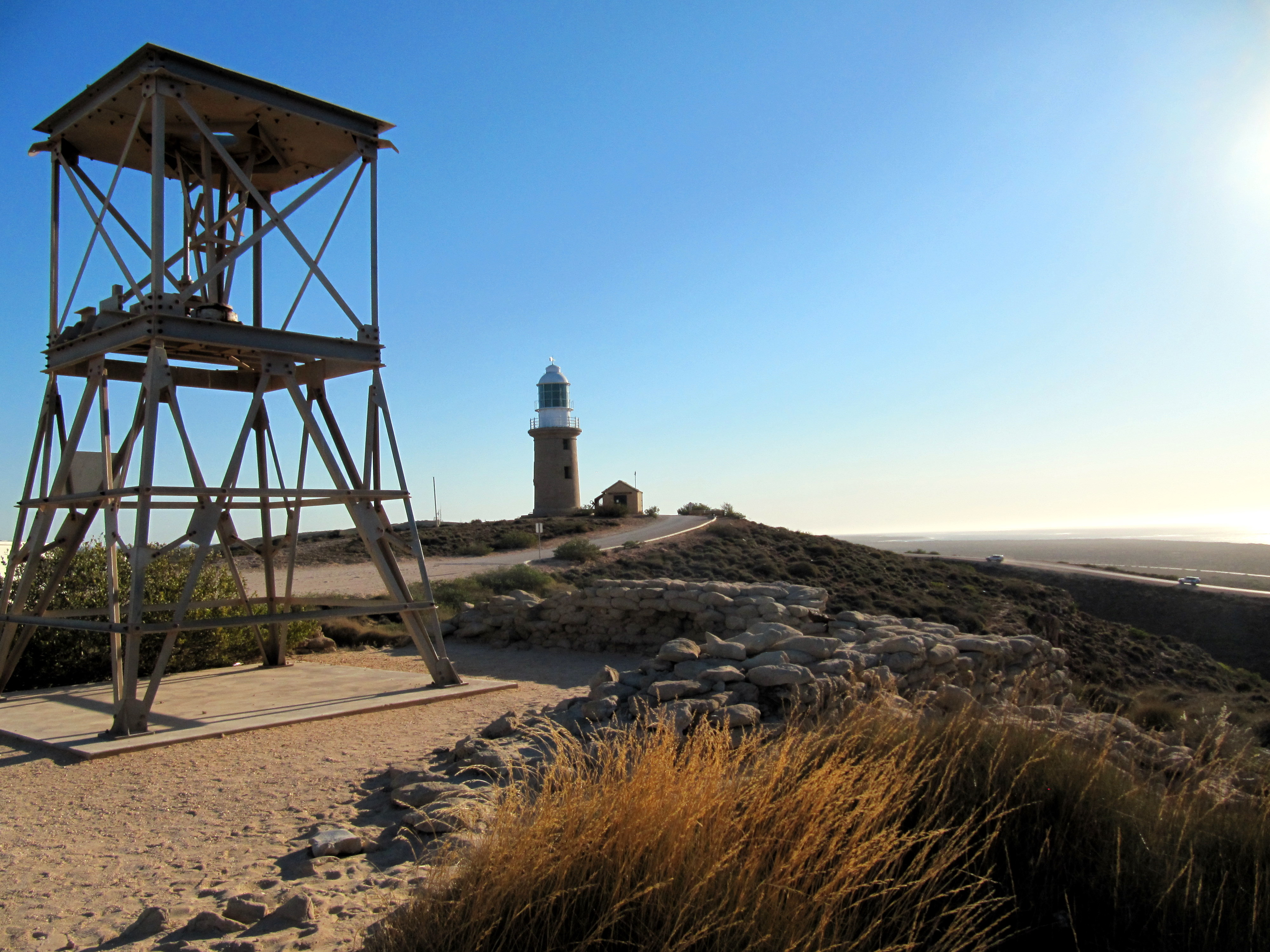
Vlamingh Head lighthouse

The town relies more on tourism than the station for its existence. At the 2016 census, Exmouth had a population of 2,486. At the height of the tourist season, the population swells to 6,000.

Exmouth is popular for diving and snorkelling. Some of the most famous snorkeling spots include Turquoise Bay and Oysters Stacks.

The Cape Range National Park, which has several gorges, is an area of 50,600 hectares (125,000 acres) and its main area is focused on the west coast of the Cape, which provides a large variety of camp sites on the coastal fringe of the park. Yardie Creek and Charles Knife Gorge are land based attractions.

On 20 April 2023, Exmouth was in the direct path of a total solar eclipse, which was the first to be visible in Australia since November 2012. More than 20,000 people watched the eclipse from Exmouth. This cost the State Government of Western Australia A$22 million in planning and logistics fees.

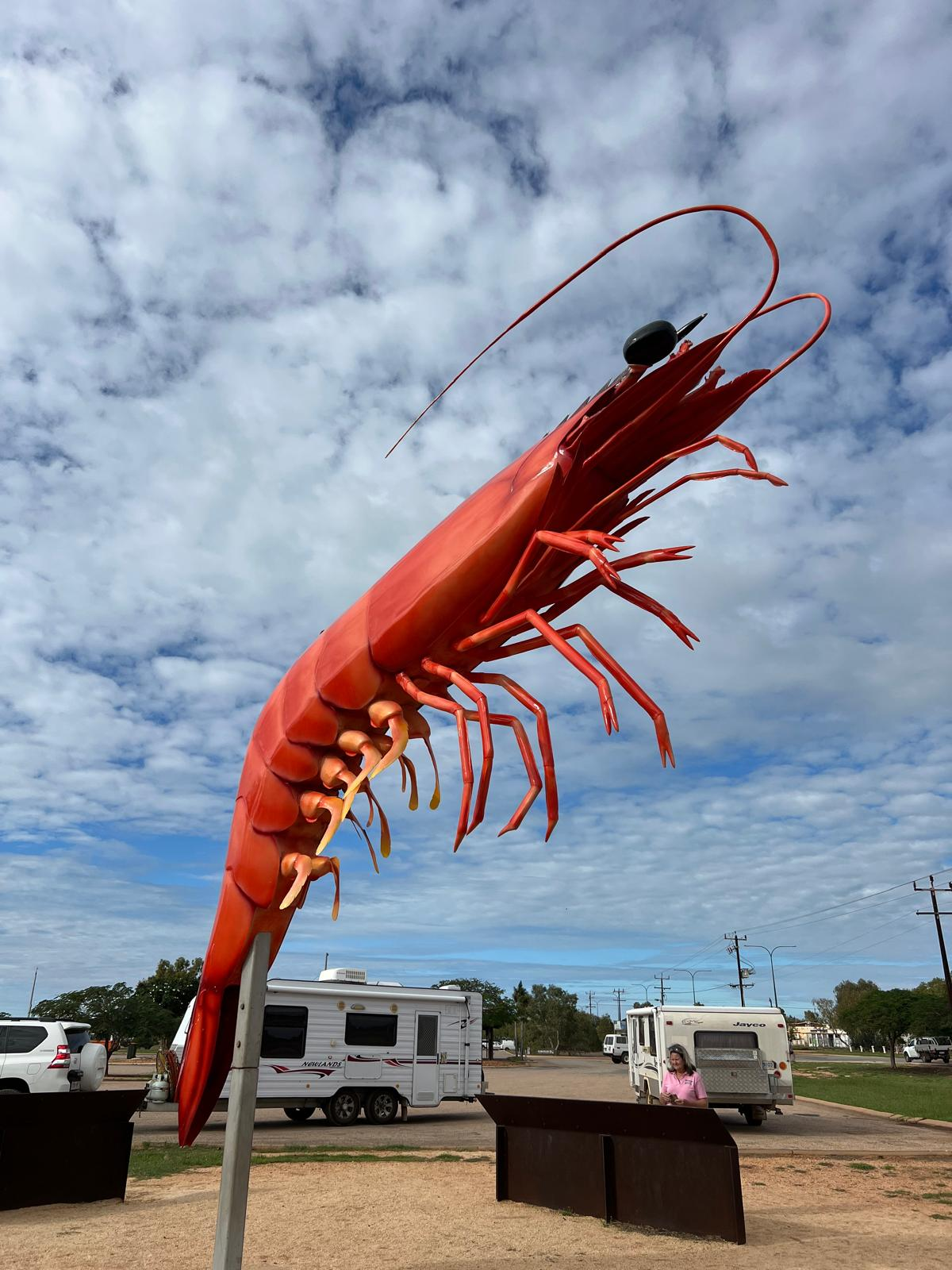
The Big Prawn, 2024

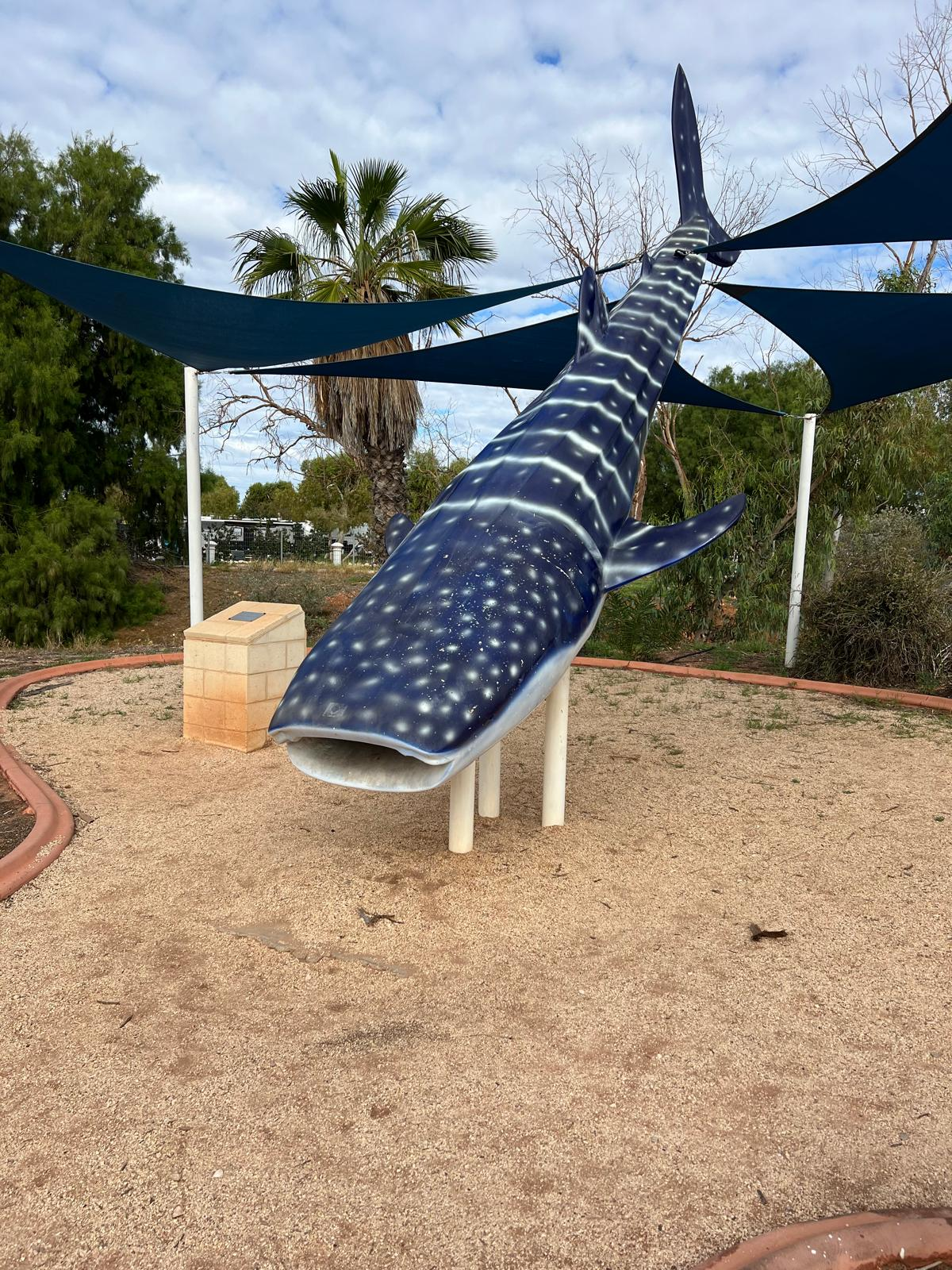
The Big Whale Shark, 2024

=== Big Things ===
Exmouth is also home to two of Australia's Big Things: The Big Whale Shark (constructed 2002) and The Big Prawn (constructed 2005) both of which were constructed by Brian Paskins.

There is an ongoing "Prawn War" between this Big Prawn and the Big Prawn in Ballina, New South Wales; the Big Prawn in Ballina is larger but Exmouth locals say theirs is much more realistic.

== Climate ==
Exmouth has a hot arid climate (Köppen BWh). Temperatures often reach over 40 °C (104 °F) in summer; while winters are warm with afternoon temperatures around 25 °C (77 °F) and mornings around 13 °C (55 °F). There is no specific wet and dry season in Exmouth, although rain is most likely to fall between January and July, usually with monsoonal showers and storms from January to April and from the northern edges of cold fronts in May, June and July. The area occasionally gets caught by tropical cyclones. The period from August to December is usually dry.

Climate data for Learmonth Airport
Month	Jan	Feb	Mar	Apr	May	Jun	Jul	Aug	Sep	Oct	Nov	Dec	Year
Record high °C (°F)	48.9 (120.0)	47.7 (117.9)	45.5 (113.9)	42.5 (108.5)	37.3 (99.1)	31.9 (89.4)	31.7 (89.1)	35.3 (95.5)	41.3 (106.3)	43.0 (109.4)	44.2 (111.6)	48.9 (120.0)	48.9 (120.0)
Mean daily maximum °C (°F)	37.9 (100.2)	37.5 (99.5)	36.5 (97.7)	33.3 (91.9)	28.5 (83.3)	24.8 (76.6)	24.3 (75.7)	26.4 (79.5)	29.4 (84.9)	32.8 (91.0)	34.6 (94.3)	36.9 (98.4)	31.9 (89.4)
Daily mean °C (°F)	30.5 (86.9)	30.8 (87.4)	29.8 (85.6)	26.9 (80.4)	22.3 (72.1)	19.0 (66.2)	17.9 (64.2)	19.3 (66.7)	21.6 (70.9)	24.6 (76.3)	26.6 (79.9)	28.9 (84.0)	24.8 (76.6)
Mean daily minimum °C (°F)	23.0 (73.4)	24.1 (75.4)	23.0 (73.4)	20.4 (68.7)	16.1 (61.0)	13.1 (55.6)	11.4 (52.5)	12.1 (53.8)	13.8 (56.8)	16.4 (61.5)	18.5 (65.3)	20.9 (69.6)	17.7 (63.9)
Record low °C (°F)	16.1 (61.0)	17.4 (63.3)	15.0 (59.0)	12.9 (55.2)	7.6 (45.7)	4.9 (40.8)	3.5 (38.3)	4.2 (39.6)	5.6 (42.1)	7.9 (46.2)	12.0 (53.6)	14.2 (57.6)	3.5 (38.3)
Average rainfall mm (inches)	31.0 (1.22)	40.9 (1.61)	40.8 (1.61)	17.6 (0.69)	42.2 (1.66)	43.2 (1.70)	22.0 (0.87)	11.4 (0.45)	2.1 (0.08)	1.6 (0.06)	1.8 (0.07)	6.1 (0.24)	256.7 (10.11)
Average rainy days (≥ 1.0 mm)	1.5	2.1	1.6	1.1	2.4	3.2	2.2	1.2	0.4	0.2	0.2	0.4	16.5

=== Weather events ===
On 22 March 1999, Tropical Cyclone Vance reached category 5 status as it made landfall near Exmouth. This resulted in the highest wind gust ever reported on the Australian mainland, 267 kilometres per hour (166 mph) at Learmonth, 35 kilometres (22 mi) to the south. Vance caused significant flooding and property damage. There were no casualties.

In April 2014, Exmouth was hit by a massive flash flood, nearly destroying the caravan park and seriously damaging much of the town's infrastructure, causing a severe blow to tourism in the region.

In March 2026, Cyclone Narelle caused heavy damage to the town. Reportedly there are 4 structures confirmed destroyed and 27 that were damaged. The Exmouth airport was closed. The supplies of electricity and water were disrupted.
