= Silent Running: My Years on a World War II Attack Submarine =

US military memoir

- Author: James F. Calvert
- Language: English
- Genre: Memoir
- Publisher: John Wiley & Sons
- Publication date: 1995
- ISBN: 9780471127789

Silent Running: My Years on a World War II Attack Submarine is a memoir written in 1995 by Vice Admiral James F. Calvert, USN (Ret.) and published by John Wiley & Sons in 1995 (ISBN 9780471127789). It is held in almost 600 US libraries.

Calvert operated the TDC (i.e. aimed the torpedoes) aboard the USS Jack (SS-259). The book covers the period from June 1943 until the end of the Pacific War in July 1945 with the surrender of Japan.

The book is named after the eponymous stealth mode of submarine operation.
