= Vlamingh Head Lighthouse =

Lighthouse on North West Cape in Western Australia

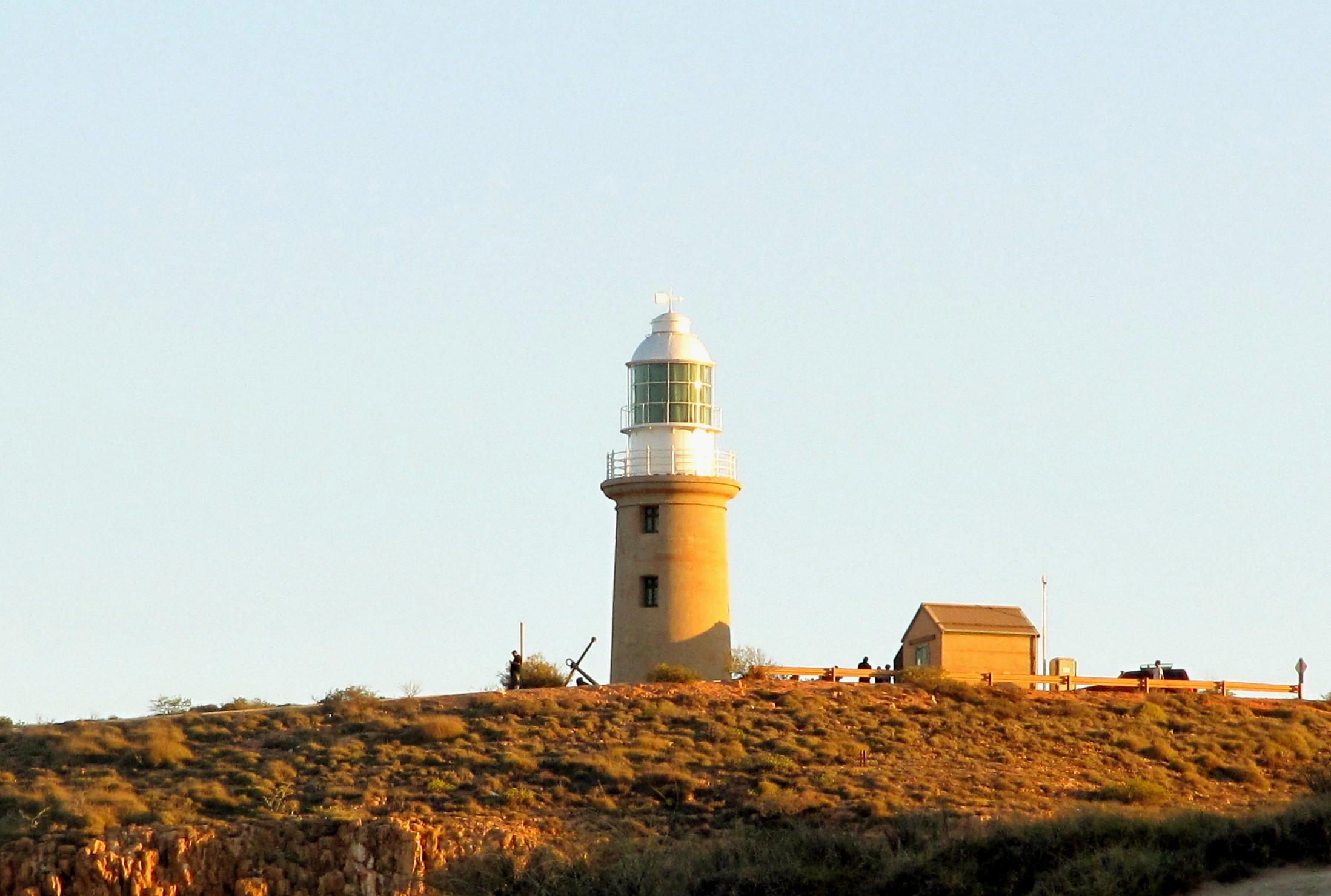
- Location: Shire of Exmouth, Australia
- Coordinates: 21°48′30″S 114°06′37″E

Tower
- Heritage: State Registered Place

Light
- First lit: 1912
- Deactivated: 1969

Western Australia Heritage Register
- Official name: Vlamingh Head Lighthouse Group
- Type: State Registered Place
- Designated: 22 May 2007
- Reference no.: 837

Vlamingh Head Lighthouse is a lighthouse which is situated 17 kilometres (11 mi) to the north of the settlement of Exmouth, Western Australia, overlooking Lighthouse Bay. The lighthouse is notable as being one of the few locations in Australia where both the sunrise and the sunset can be observed.

== History ==
The first recorded sighting of this part of Australia was by the Dutch sailor Haevik Claezoon van Hillegom in 1618. His countryman Willem de Vlamingh then charted the headland in 1696. In 1801 Nicolas Baudin named the area Cape Murat.

The north west coast of Australia had been regarded as dangerous for many years. This coastline is one of the most hazardous stretches of coast in the world and the building of a lighthouse on this coast had long been considered. In 1907 a board of enquiry was set up and the captains of numerous coastal vessels were questioned to obtain their views on the best sites to build lighthouses on. Out of these, four locations were selected where lighthouses would be built in the subsequent two years. However, the wreck of the SS Mildura off the North West Cape in 1907 led to Vlamingh Head, a site which had been proposed by a number of ships' masters to the Board of Enquiry but had not gained sufficient support. Being recommended as the fifth lighthouse along this stretch of coast, in 1909 the Harbour and Lights Department announced that a lighthouse was to be constructed at Vlamingh Head. Construction of the lighthouse started in November 1911, but it was to be delayed by bad drinking water, outbreaks of dysentery among the labourers and the requirement to transport all of the building materials and supplies by sea from Fremantle.

The lighthouse started operations on 10 November 1912 with a light that could be seen for up to 41 kilometres (25 mi). The light took two lighthouse keepers to keep its light burning. The light used kerosene and flashed twice every 7.5 seconds. Keepers' quarters were provided nearby and the supplies of fuel and the keepers' provisions landed on the beach and transported to the lighthouse by horse-drawn carriages on a tramway. The lighthouse operated for sixty years up to 1969 when the light was replaced by a light mounted on tower 11 at the US Naval Communications VLF site at Point Murat (Naval Communication Station Harold E. Holt).

In the Second World War the North West Cape was an important refuelling depot for US Navy ships and an airbase was developed at Learmonth which led to a radar station being built near the lighthouse. In 1953 a cyclone caused considerable damage to both the airbase and the radar station and caused extensive damage to the lighthouse and keepers' quarters, with the keepers themselves doing much of the repair work themselves.

== Tourism ==
The lighthouse has become a tourist attraction and the end of a scenic drive from Exmouth. The Ningaloo Lighthouse Holiday Park is situated close to the Vlamingh Head Lighthouse. Tourists are attracted by the landscape, the sunset and whale watching with information panels are provided to assist in interpretation of the site.
