= Cape Range National Park =

National park in Western Australia

- IUCN category II (national park)
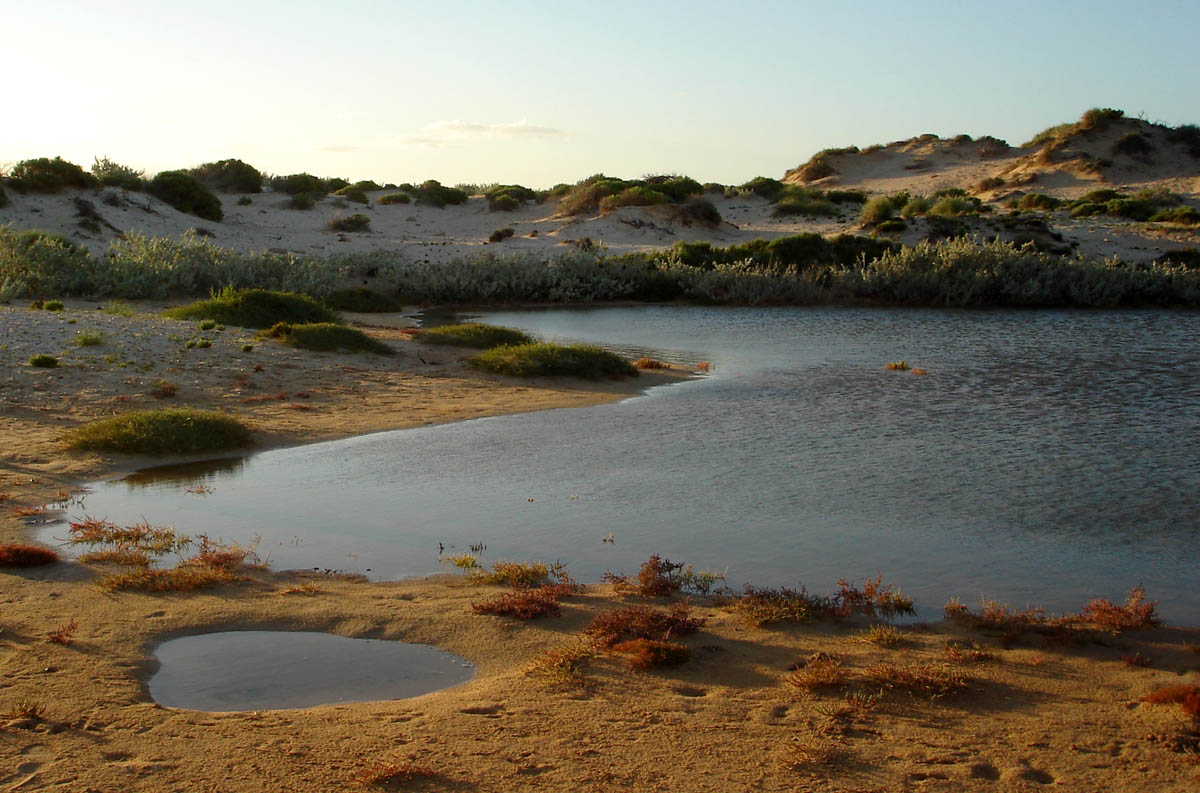
- Cape Range Landscape

- Location within Western Australia
- Location: Western Australia
- Nearest city: Exmouth
- Coordinates: 22°07′24″S 113°55′14″E
- Area: 476.55 km^{2} (184.00 sq mi)
- Established: 1965
- Governing body: Parks and Wildlife Service, Department of Biodiversity, Conservation and Attractions
- Website: parks.dpaw.wa.gov.au/park/cape-range

Cape Range National Park is a national park in the Gascoyne region of Western Australia, 1,105 kilometres (687 mi) north of Perth. The park occupies the western side of the North West Cape peninsula over an area of 47,655 hectares (117,760 acres). The nearest town is Exmouth, and directly off the coast is the Ningaloo Reef. The area resulted from a gradual uplifting from the sea floor followed by fluctuating sea levels, wind and water erosion that have slowly eroded the range and plain leaving behind a range of rugged limestone, deep canyons, and pristine beaches.

There is also an eponymous locality of the Shire of Exmouth, but the boundaries of the national park and the locality are not identical.

== Overview ==
The Cape is the only elevated plateau composed of limestone on the North West Coast. The range has plateaus to an elevation of 314 metres (1,030 ft) and forms the backbone of the peninsula which extends as far as North West Cape.

Yardie Creek, a spectacular gorge where the water is trapped by a sandbar, is located within the park. Unlike most waterways in the region, Yardie Creek retains water throughout the year and provides habitat for a variety of wildlife.

Over 700 caves are located within the park and it is probable that many others remain undiscovered. Over 630 species of wildflower are found within the park, that generally bloom toward the end of winter, including the bird flower and the desert sturt pea.

The area was under pastoral lease beginning in 1876 when J Brockman acquired leases in the area covering North West Cape to run cattle. Brockman sold parts of the lease in 1888 to ornithologist Thomas Carter including Yardie Creek and Ningaloo Station. Carter was the first settler in the area and established a pastoral station in 1889. The area was declared a national park in 1964, the off-shore area, Ningaloo Marine Park, was declared in 1987.

An abundance of flora and fauna are found within the park. Flora species include mangroves, acacia, spinifex, grevillea, verticordia, eucalyptus and minilya lily. Fauna found within the park include rock wallabies, red kangaroos, emus, euros, 100 different species of bird and 80 species of reptile.

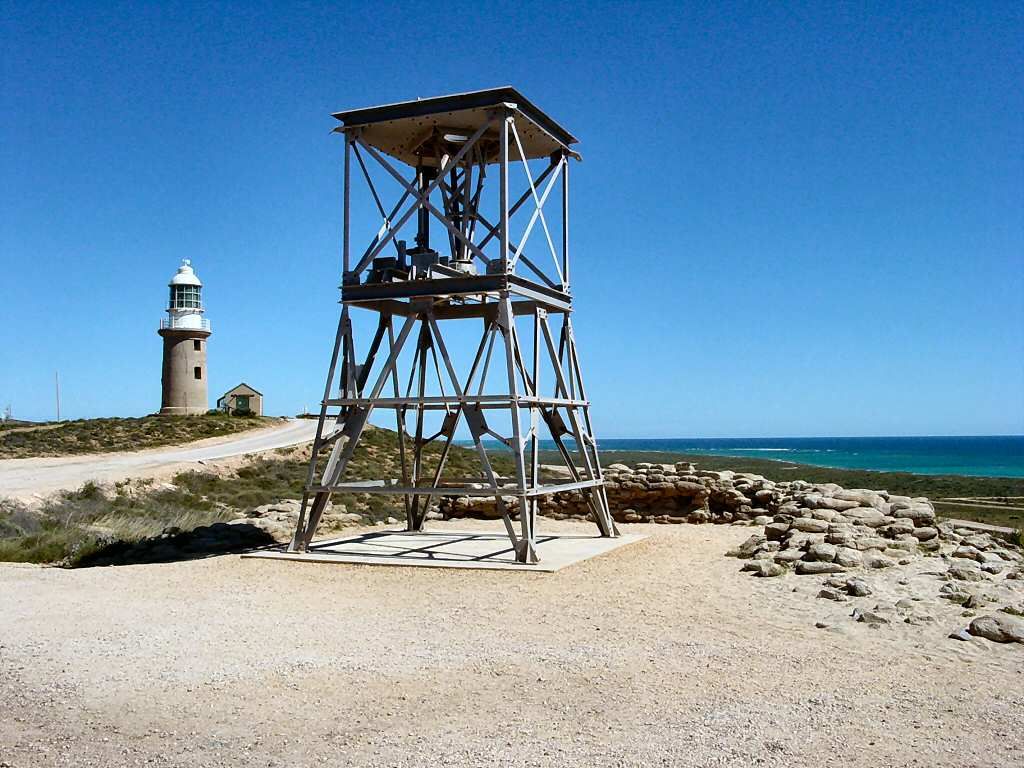
An old WWII radar tower with the Vlamingh Head Lighthouse behind

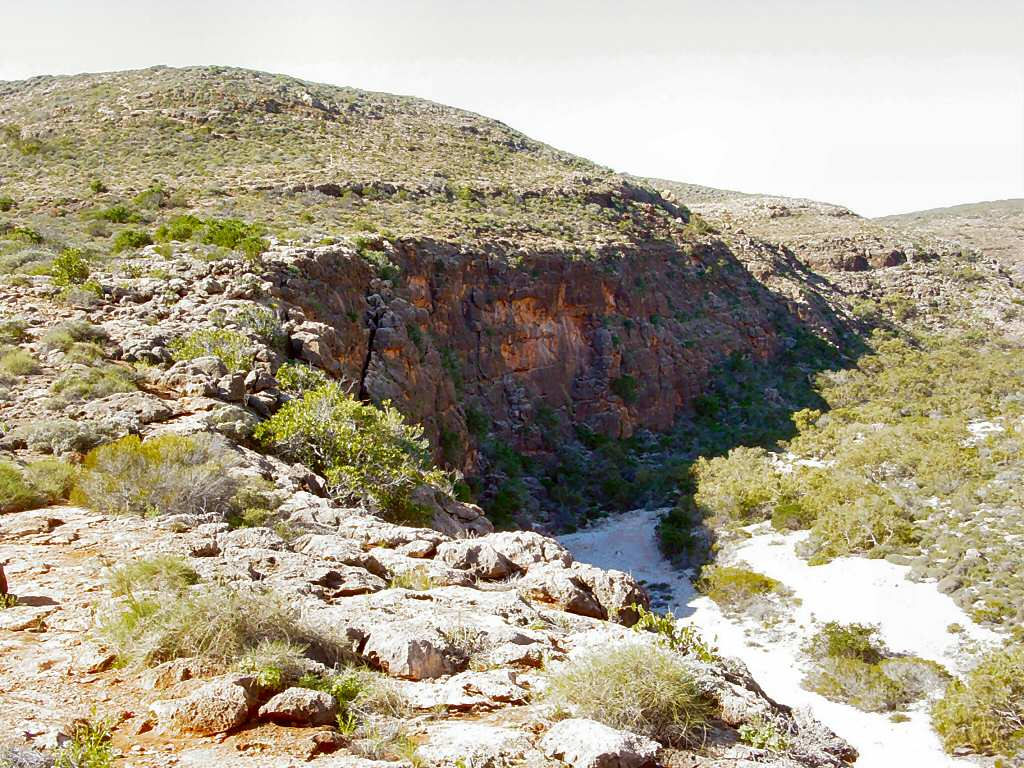

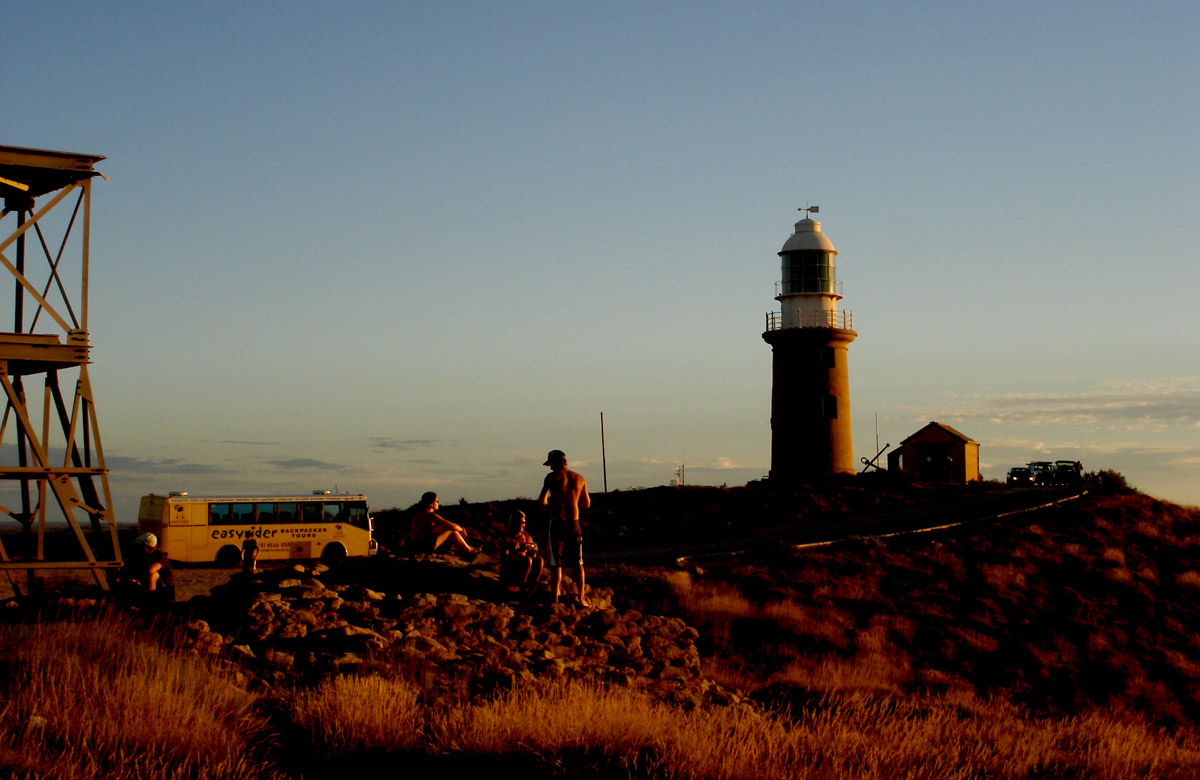
The Vlamingh Head Lighthouse at dusk

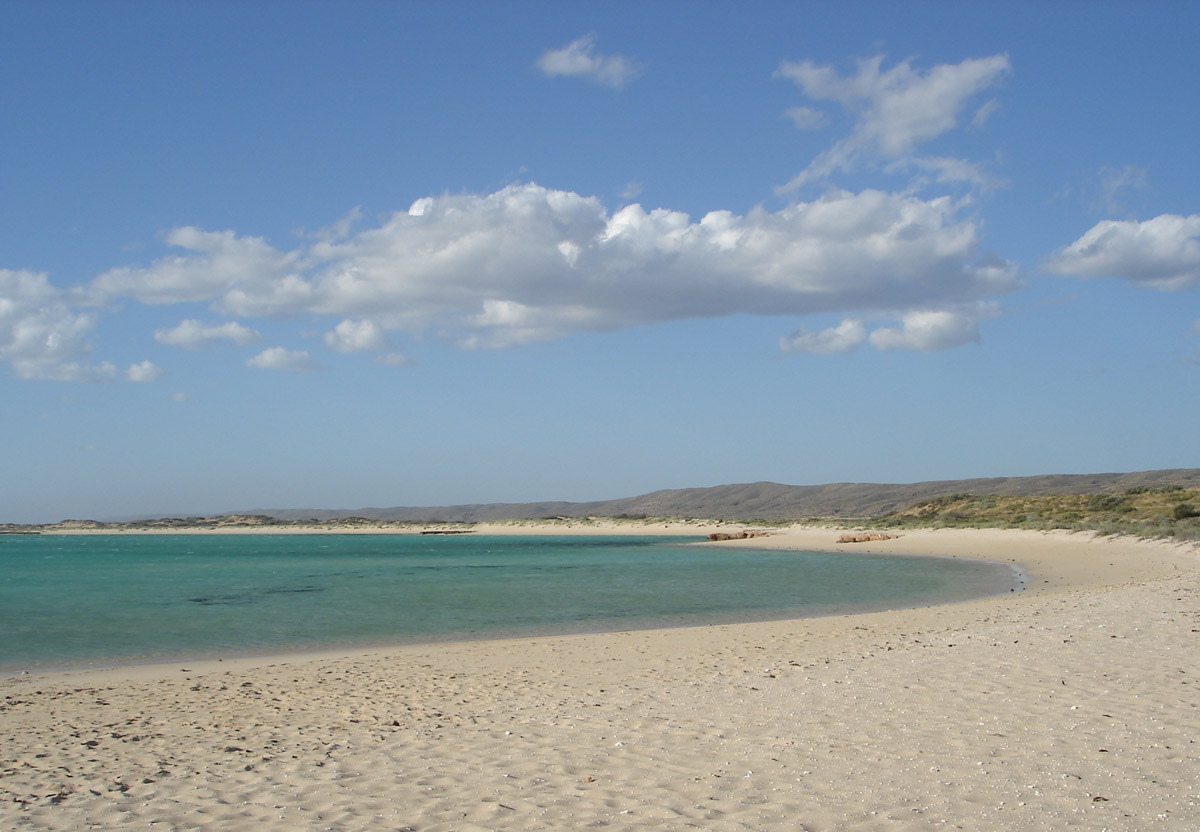
Beach in Cape Range

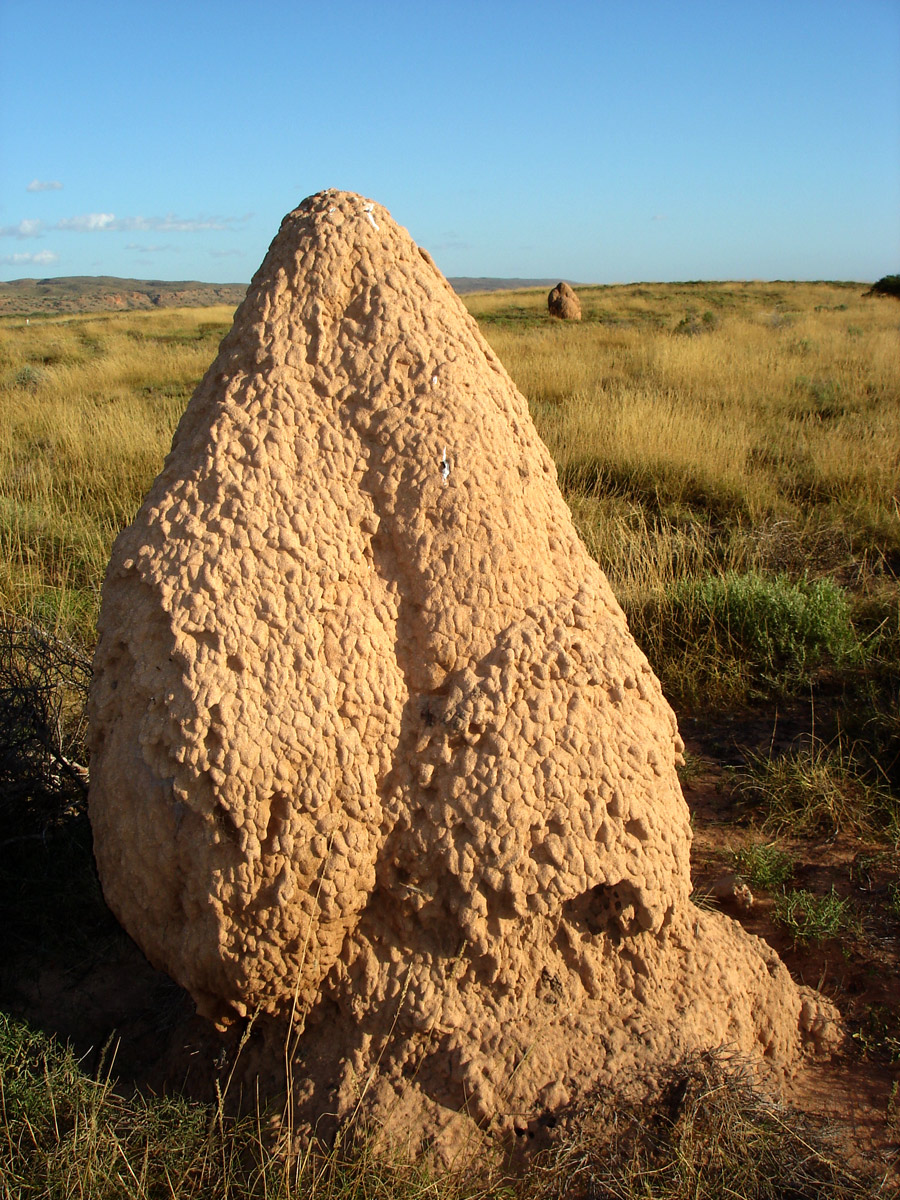
One of the countless termite hills

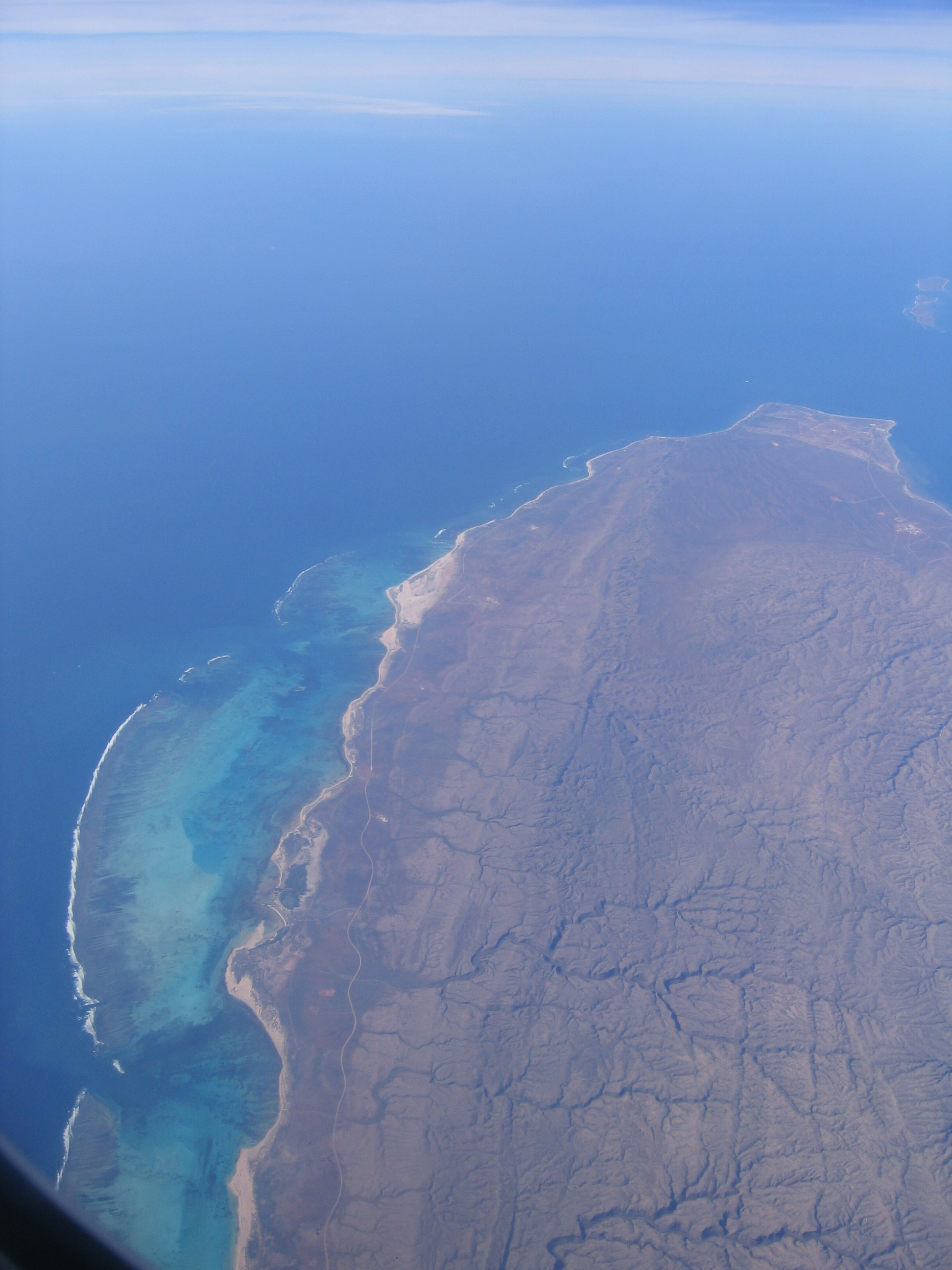
Cape Range National Park and Ningaloo Reef from the air
