= North West Cape =

Peninsula in Western Australia

Coordinates: 22°14′S 113°58′E

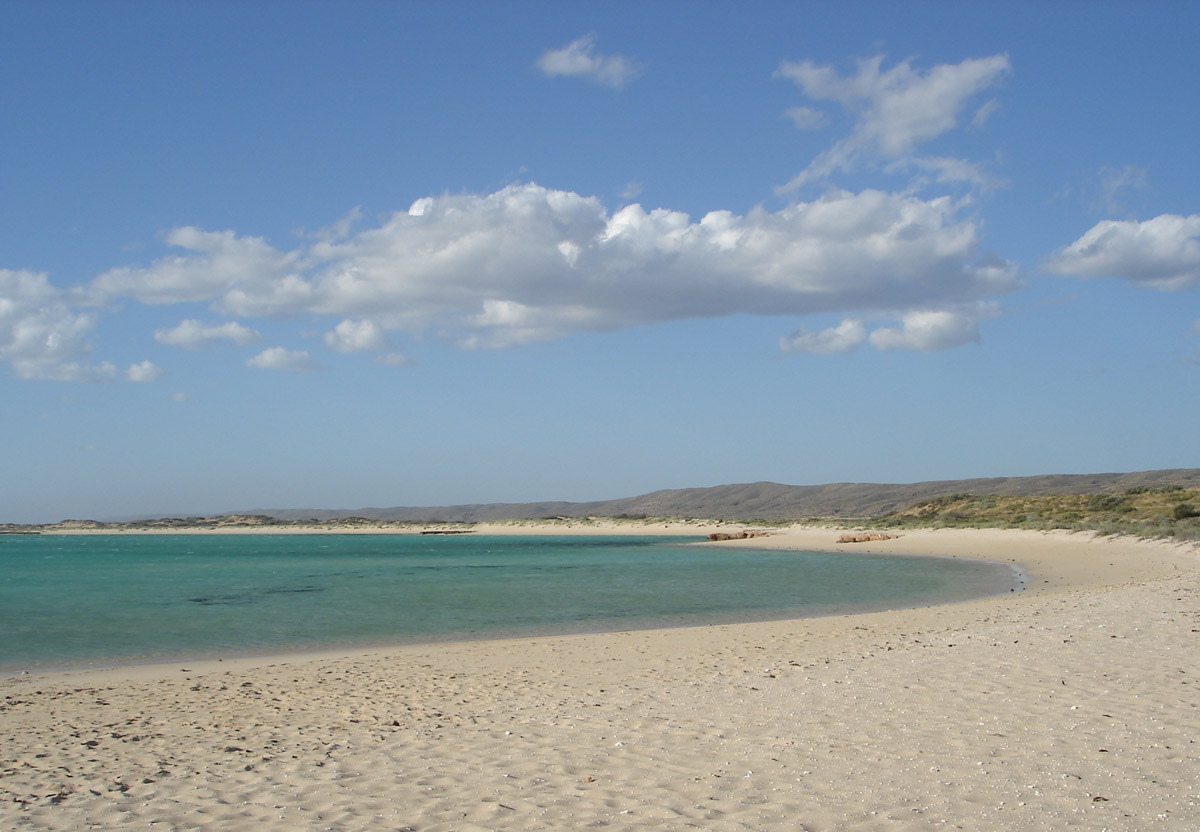
Exmouth cape range beach

North West Cape is a peninsula in the north-west of Western Australia. Cape Range runs down the spine of the peninsula and Ningaloo Reef runs along the western edge. It is in the Gascoyne region and includes the town of Exmouth.

== History ==
In 1618, Dutch East India Company captain Lenaert Jacobszoon and supercargo Willem Janszoon of the Mauritius landed in the area. Phillip Parker King later visited in 1818 and named it North West Cape as well as naming Exmouth Gulf after senior naval officer Edward Pellew, 1st Viscount Exmouth. Later, pearl luggers visited the area from Broome. During World War II a military operation codenamed Operation Potshot was done in the area. The first oil flow in Australia was discovered there in 1953 at Rough Range, by exploration company WAPET.

Exmouth Gulf Station takes up much of the eastern side of the peninsula backing onto Exmouth Gulf.

The Naval Communication Station Harold E. Holt is located on the Cape. The joint Australian and United States station is operated and maintained by the Australian Department of Defence.

== See also ==
- Exmouth, Western Australia
- Cape Range National Park
- United States Naval Communication Station Harold E. Holt
- Ningaloo Reef
