= European maritime exploration of Australia =

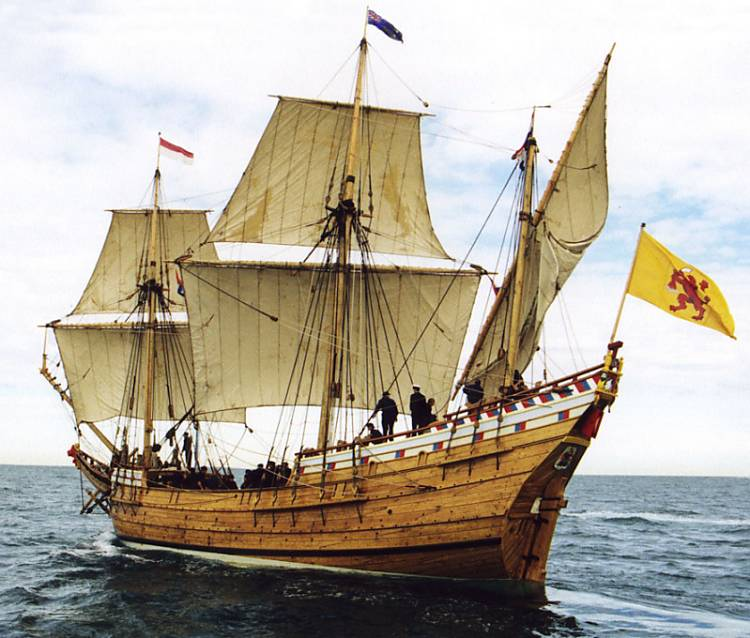
Replica of the ship Duyfken, the first European ship to reach Australia

Several waves of European seafarers explored the coastline of Australia over time. Dutch navigators were the first Europeans known to have explored and mapped this coastline. The first documented encounter was that of Dutch navigator Willem Janszoon in 1606. Dutch seafarers also visited the west and north coasts of the continent, as did French explorers.

The most famous expedition was that of the UK Royal Navy's Lieutenant (and later Captain) James Cook, which took place in 1770 – 164 years after Janszoon's sighting. After an assignment to observe the 1769 Transit of Venus, Cook followed instructions from the British Admiralty to explore the South Pacific for the reported continent of Terra Australis; on 19 April, Cook sighted the south-eastern coast of Australia and became the first recorded European to explore the eastern coastline. Explorers by land and sea continued to survey the continent for some years after settlement.

== Pro-Iberian hypotheses and theories ==
The south-eastern section of the map La Terre Australie by Desceliers (1550), claimed to represent Portuguese discoveries along the east coast of Australia in the early 1500s

Some writers have advanced the theory that the Portuguese were the first Europeans to sight Australia in the 1520s.

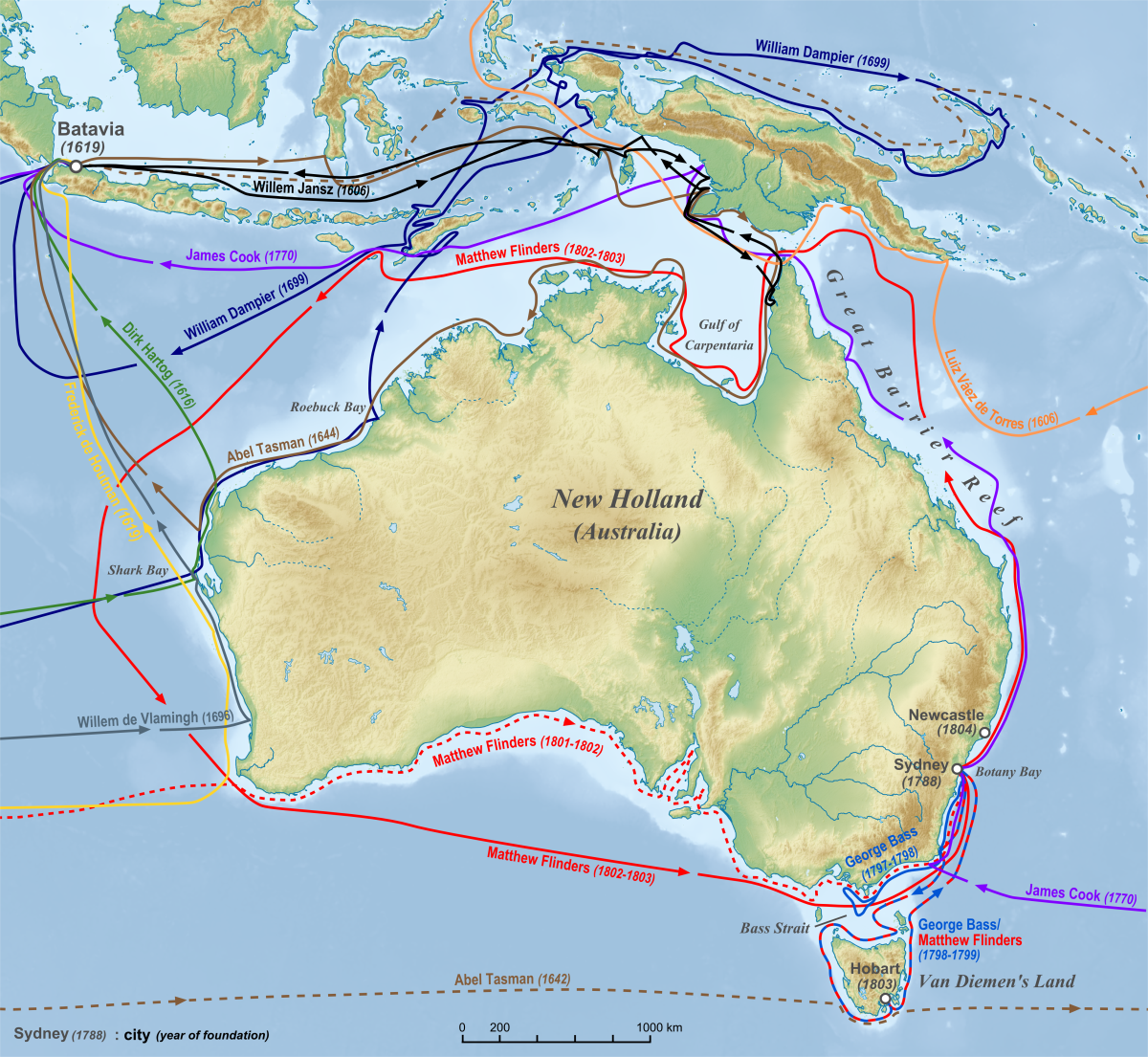
Selected voyages of exploration by Europeans to 1812 1606 Willem Janszoon 1606 Luís Vaz de Torres 1616 Dirk Hartog 1619 Frederick de Houtman 1642 Abel Tasman 1696 Willem de Vlamingh 1699 William Dampier 1770 James Cook 1788 Arthur Phillip 1797–1799 George Bass 1801–1803 Matthew Flinders

A number of relics and remains have been interpreted as evidence that the Portuguese reached Australia. The primary evidence to support this theory is the representation of the continent of Jave la Grande, which appears on a series of French world maps known as the Dieppe maps that may be partially based on Portuguese charts. However, most historians do not accept this theory, and the interpretation of the Dieppe maps is highly contentious. In the early 20th century, Lawrence Hargrave argued that Spain had established a colony in Botany Bay in the 16th century. Five coins from the Kilwa Sultanate were found on Marchinbar Island, in the Wessel Islands, in 1945 by Royal Australian Air Force (RAAF) radar operator Morry Isenberg. In 2018, another coin – also thought to be from Kilwa – was found on a beach on Elcho Island, another of the Wessel Islands, by archaeologist and member of the research group Past Masters, Mike Hermes. Hermes speculated that the coins may suggest trade between Indigenous Australians and Kilwa, or they may have arrived via Makassan contact with Australia. Mike Owen, another member of Past Masters, offered two speculations: these coins may have arrived sometime after the installation of Muhammad Arcone on the Kilwa throne as a Portuguese vassal, from 1505 to 1506; or the Portuguese may have visited the Wessel Islands.

The French navigator Binot Paulmier de Gonneville claimed to have landed in an area that he described as "east of the Cape of Good Hope" in 1504, after being blown off course. For some time, it had been thought that he landed in Australia, but the place where he landed has now been shown to be Brazil (which is north-west of the Cape).

== 17th century ==
=== Dutch exploration ===
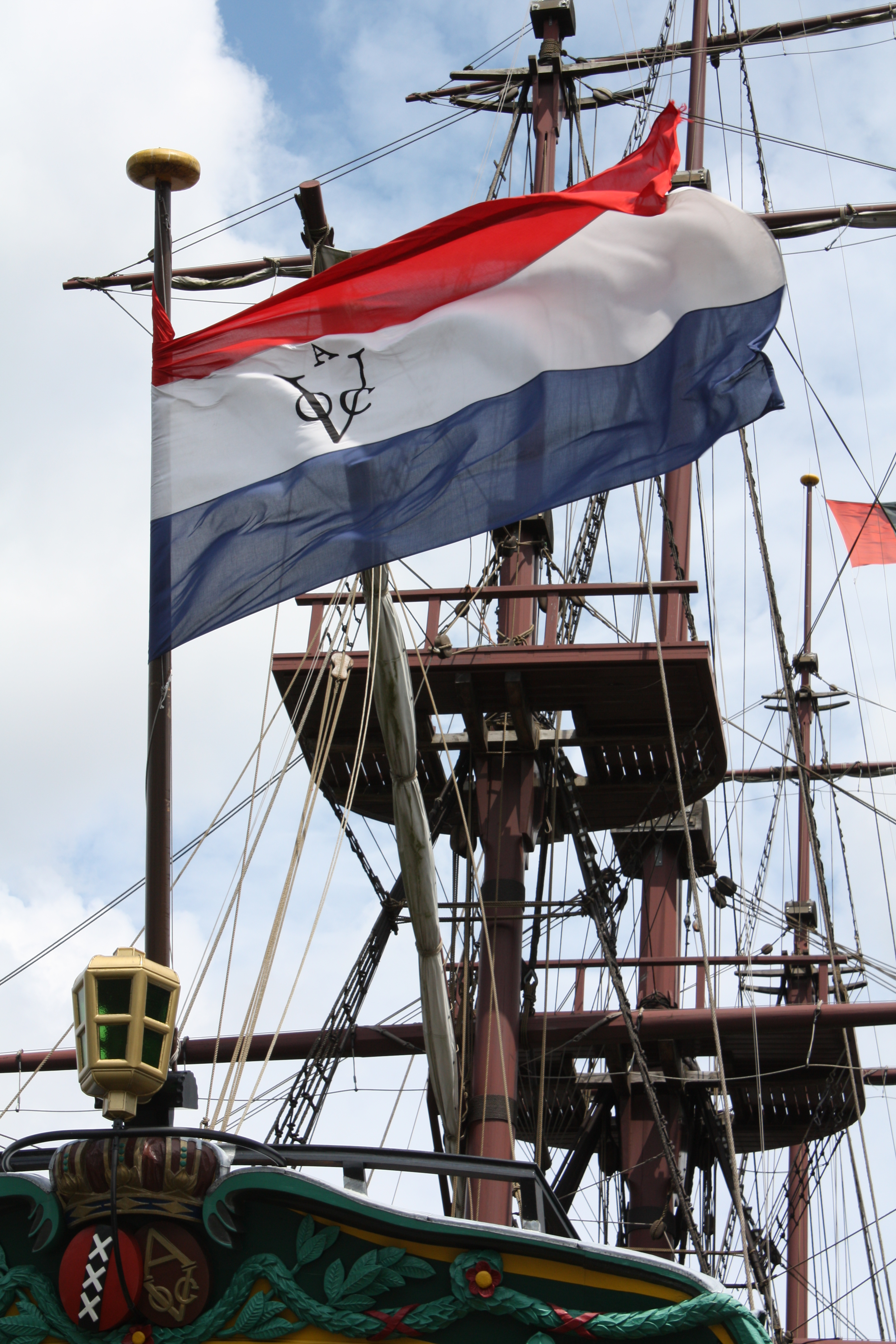
Replica of an East Indiaman merchant ship of the Dutch East India Company (or United East India Company, VOC), which was a major force behind Dutch exploration and mapping of Australia

The most significant exploration of Australia in the 17th century was by the Dutch. The Dutch East India Company (Dutch: Vereenigde Oostindische Compagnie [VOC], "United East India Company") was set up in 1602 and traded extensively with the islands which now form parts of Indonesia, and hence were already close to Australia.

The first documented and undisputed European sighting of and landing on Australia was in late February 1606, by the Dutch navigator Willem Janszoon aboard the Duyfken. Janszoon charted the Australian coast and met with Aboriginal people. Janszoon followed the coast of New Guinea, missed the Torres Strait, and explored and then charted part of the western side of Cape York, in the Gulf of Carpentaria, believing the land was still part of New Guinea. On 26 February 1606, Janszoon and his party made landfall near the modern town of Weipa and the Pennefather River, but they were promptly attacked by the Indigenous people. Janszoon proceeded down the coast for some 350 km (220 mi). He stopped in places, but he was met by hostile natives, and some of his men were killed. At the last of these places, he initially had friendly relations with the natives, but after he forced them to hunt for him and appropriated some of their women, violence broke out, and there were many deaths on both sides. These events were recorded in Aboriginal oral history that has come down to the present day. There Janszoon decided to turn back, the place later being called Cape Keerweer, Dutch for "turnabout".

That same year, a Spanish expedition sailing in nearby waters and led by Pedro Fernández de Quirós landed in the New Hebrides; believing this to be the fabled southern continent, they named the land Austrialia del Espiritu Santo ("Southern Land of the Holy Spirit"), in honour of his queen, Margaret of Austria, the wife of Philip III of Spain. Later that year, De Quirós' deputy, Luís Vaez de Torres, sailed to the north of Australia through the Torres Strait, charting New Guinea's south coast, and possibly sighting Cape York in October 1606.

In 1611, Hendrik Brouwer, working for the VOC, discovered that sailing from Europe to Batavia was much quicker if the Roaring Forties winds were used. Until that time, the Dutch had followed a route copied from Arab and Portuguese sailors who followed the coasts of Africa, Mauritius and Ceylon. The new Brouwer Route involved sailing south from the Cape of Good Hope (at 34° south latitude) into the Roaring Forties (at 40–50° south latitude), and then sailing east before turning north to Java using the South Indian Ocean Current. The Brouwer Route became compulsory for Dutch vessels in 1617. The problem with this route, however, was that longitude could not easily be determined at the time, making Dutch landfalls on the west coast of Australia inevitable, as well as shipwrecks on the shoals. Most of these landfalls were unplanned. The first such landfall was in 1616, when Dirk Hartog, employed by the VOC, reached land at Shark Bay (on what is now called Dirk Hartog Island) off the coast of Western Australia. Finding nothing of interest, Hartog continued sailing northwards along this coastline previously unknown to Europeans, making nautical charts up to about 22° south latitude. He then left the coast and continued onward to Batavia. He called Australia 't Landt van d'Eendracht – shortened to Eendrachtsland – after his ship; this name remained in use until Abel Tasman named the land New Holland in 1644.

In 1619, two explorers in VOC ships – Frederik de Houtman in the Dordrecht and Jacob d'Edel in the Amsterdam – sighted land on the Australian coast near present-day Perth, which they called d'Edelsland. After sailing northwards along the coast, they made landfall at Eendrachtsland, which had previously been encountered and named by Hartog, before turning for Batavia.

Hessel Gerritsz was appointed on 16 October 1617 as the first exclusive cartographer of the VOC; his job included creating and maintaining charts of coastlines in the area. Gerritsz produced a map in 1622 which showed the first part of Australia to be charted, that by Janszoon in 1606. This area was considered part of New Guinea and called Nueva Guinea on the map, but Gerritsz added an inscription as follows:

"Those who sailed with the yacht of Pedro Fernandes de Queirós in the neighbourhood of New Guinea to 10 degrees westward through many islands and shoals and over 2, 3 and 4 fathoms for as many as 40 days, presumed that New Guinea did not extend beyond 10 degrees to the south. If this be so, then the land from 9 to 14 degrees would be a separate land, different from the other New Guinea".

All charts and logs from returning VOC merchants and explorer sailors were required to be submitted to Gerritsz, and these charts and logs provided new information for several breakthrough maps which he produced. Gerritsz's charts later accompanied all VOC captains on their voyages. In 1627 Gerritsz made a map, the Caert van't Landt van d'Eendracht, entirely devoted to the discoveries of the West Australian coastline; this was named "Eendrachtsland", though the name had been used since 1619.

On 1 May 1622, Englishman John Brooke in the Tryall – a vessel owned by the British East India Company weighing approximately 500 tons – on the way to Batavia, made the second English voyage to use Brouwer's southern route. Brooke sailed too far east and sighted the coastline of Western Australia at Point Cloates (about 22° south latitude); however, he mistook it for an island sighted in 1618 by Janszoon (and in 1816 named Barrow Island by Phillip Parker King). Brooke and his crew did not land there, and a few weeks later they were shipwrecked on an uncharted reef northwest of the Montebello Islands (about 20° south latitude, now known as Tryal Rocks). The shipwreck caused the deaths of 93 men. But Brooke, his son John and nine men scrambled into a skiff, and the ship's factor Thomas Bright and 35 others managed to save a longboat. Brooke sailed separately to Java. Bright and his crew spent seven days ashore on the Montebello Islands before sailing the longboat to Bantam in Java. These events were the first recorded shipwreck in Australian waters and the first extended stay in Australia by Europeans.

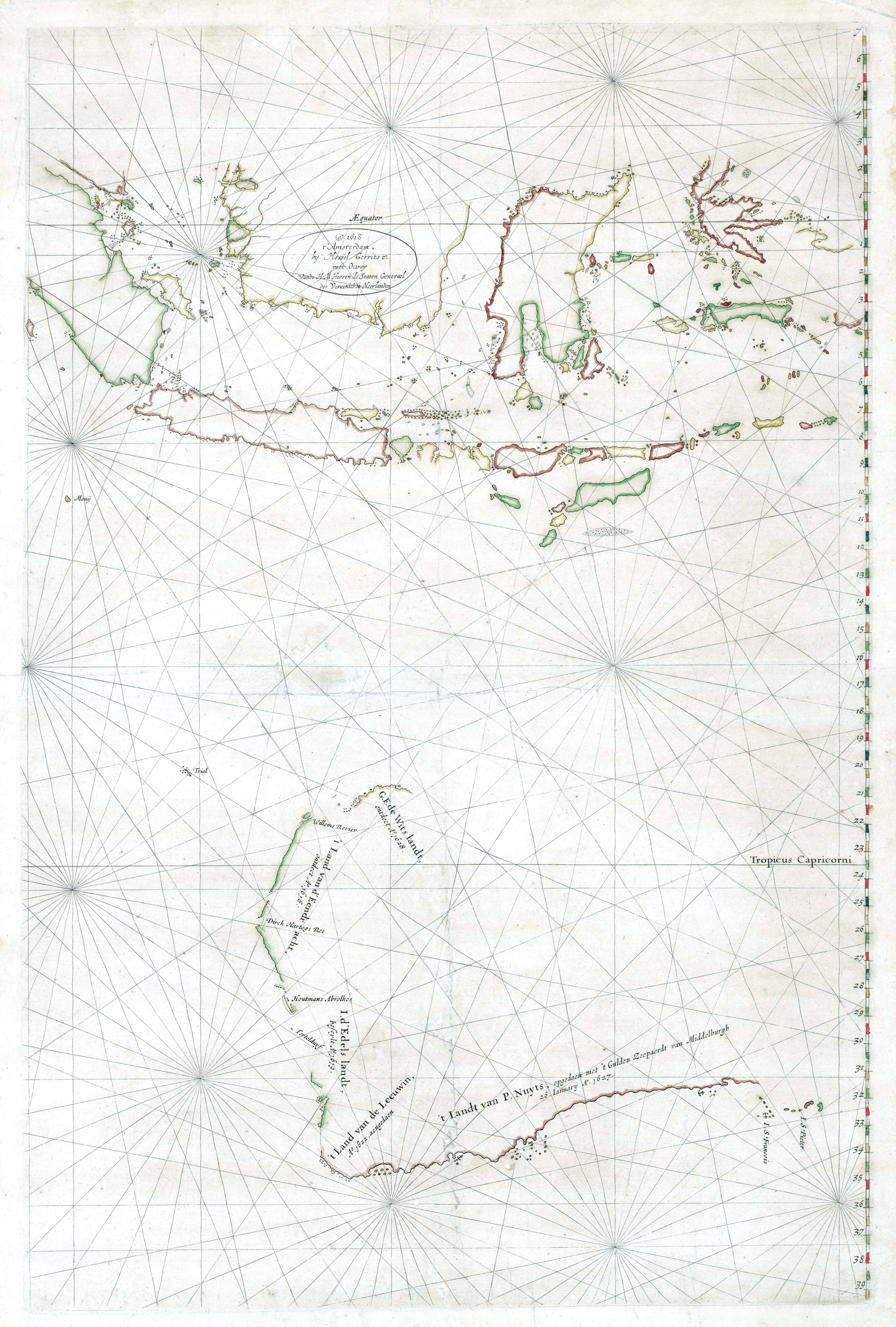
Hessel Gerritsz's map of Australia and the Dutch Indies after the exploration by François Thijssen in 1627

In March 1622, the Dutch galleon Leeuwin, captained by Jan Fransz, mapped parts of the Australian coast between Hamelin Bay and Point D'Entrecasteaux. This galleon was the first European vessel to round what is now called Cape Leeuwin. In 1623, Jan Carstensz was commissioned by the VOC to lead an expedition to the south coast of New Guinea and beyond, to follow up on reports of further land sighted by Janszoon in his 1606 voyages to the south. Departing from Amboyna in the Dutch East Indies with two ships– the Pera and Arnhem (captained by Willem Joosten Van Colster) – he travelled along the south coast of New Guinea, and then he headed south to Cape York Peninsula and the Gulf of Carpentaria. On 14 April 1623, he passed Cape Keerweer. Landing in search of fresh water for his stores, Carstensz encountered a party of local Indigenous Australian inhabitants, whom he described as "poor and miserable looking people" who had "no knowledge of precious metals or spices". On 8 May 1623, Carstensz and his crew fought a skirmish with 200 Aborigines at the mouth of a small river near Cape Duyfken (named after Janszoon's vessel which had earlier visited the region); then they landed at the Pennefather River. Carstensz named the small river Carpentier River, and the gulf the Gulf of Carpentaria, in honour of Pieter de Carpentier, Governor-General of the Dutch East Indies. Carstensz reached the Staaten River before heading north again. Carstensz and the Pera returned to Amboyna, while the Arnhem crossed the Gulf of Carpentaria, sighting the east coast of Arnhem Land.

In 1627, François Thijssen strayed too far south; on 26 January 1627, he came upon the coast of Australia, near Cape Leeuwin, the most south-western tip of the mainland. Pieter Nuyts, the VOC official aboard his ship, gave Thijssen permission to continue sailing eastwards, mapping more than 1,500 kilometres (930 mi) of the south coast of Australia – from Albany, Western Australia, to Ceduna, South Australia. Thijssen called the land 't Land van Pieter Nuyts ("The Land of Pieter Nuyts"). Part of Thijssen's map shows the islands St Francis and St Peter, now known collectively with their respective groups as the Nuyts Archipelago. Thijssen's observations were included by Gerritsz as early as 1628 in a chart of the Indies and Eendrachtsland.

One Dutch captain of this period, not really an explorer but worth mentioning, was Francisco Pelsaert. He was captain of the Batavia, which was wrecked off the coast of Western Australia in 1629.

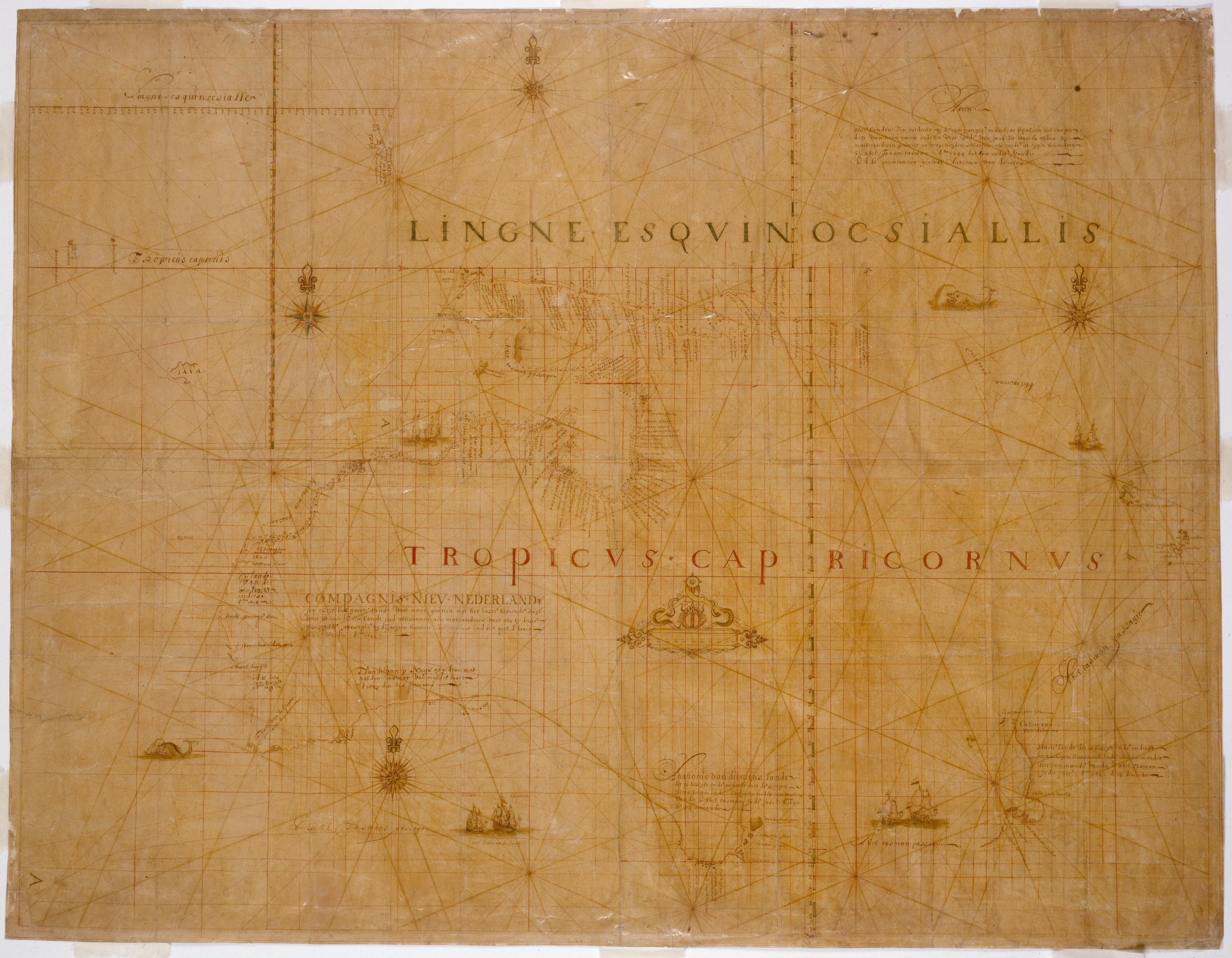
Abel Tasman's map of his own voyages, 1644, the "Bonaparte Map"

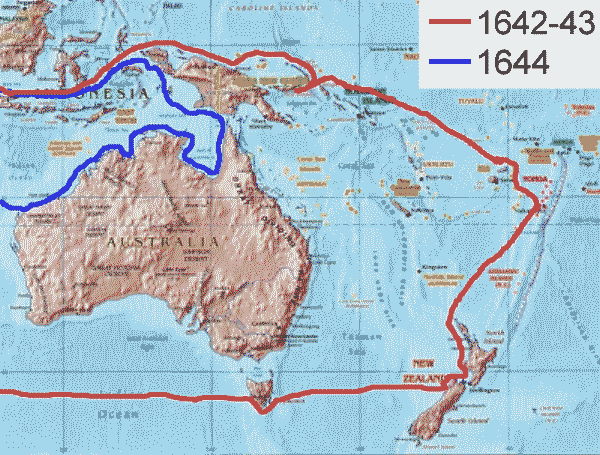
The route of Tasman's first and second voyages in 1642–1643 and 1644

In August 1642, the VOC dispatched Abel Tasman and Franchoijs Visscher on a voyage, one of whose goals was to obtain knowledge of "all the totally unknown provinces of the kingdom of Beach". This expedition used two small ships, the Heemskerck and the Zeehaen. Starting in Mauritius, both ships left on 8 October using the Roaring Forties to sail east as quickly as possible. On 7 November, because of snow and hail, the ships' course was altered to a more north-eastern direction. On 24 November 1642, Abel Tasman sighted the west coast of Tasmania, north of Macquarie Harbour. He named his discovery Van Diemen's Land, after Antonio van Diemen, Governor-General of the Dutch East Indies. Proceeding south, Tasman skirted the southern end of Tasmania and turned north-east. He then tried to work his two ships into Adventure Bay on the east coast of South Bruny Island, where he was blown out to sea by a storm; this area he named Storm Bay. Two days later, Tasman anchored to the north of Cape Frederick Hendrick, just north of the Forestier Peninsula. Tasman then landed in Blackman Bay – in the larger Marion Bay. The next day, an attempt was made to land in North Bay; however, because the sea was too rough, the ship's carpenter swam through the surf and planted the Dutch flag in North Bay. Tasman then claimed formal possession of this land on 3 December 1642.

In 1644, Tasman made a second voyage with three ships (the Limmen, the Zeemeeuw and the tender Braek). He followed the south coast of New Guinea eastwards, missed the Torres Strait between New Guinea and Australia, and continued his voyage westwards along the north Australian coast. He mapped the north coast of Australia, making observations of the land, which he called New Holland, and its people. From the perspective of the Dutch East India Company, Tasman's explorations were a disappointment: he had found neither a promising area for trade nor a useful new shipping route.

By the end of the European Renaissance period (1450 to 1650), every continent had been visited and mostly mapped by Europeans – except for the south polar continent now known as Antarctica, but originally called Terra Australis, or "Australia" for short. This geographical achievement was displayed on the large world map Nova Totius Terrarum Orbis Tabula, by the Dutch cartographer Joan Blaeu in 1648, to commemorate the Peace of Westphalia.

Danckert Danckerts's copperplate engraving of Jacob Vennekool's sketch of the 1648 Amsterdam Burgerzaal floor mosaic, in Jacob van Campen's 1661 publication Afbeelding van 't Stadt Huys van Amsterdam

A map of the world was inlaid in the floor of the Burgerzaal ("Burger's Hall") of the new Amsterdam Stadhuis ("Town Hall") in 1648; this map revealed the extent of Dutch charts of much of Australia's coast. Based on Joan Blaeu's Nova et Accuratissima Terrarum Orbis Tabula ("A New and Most Accurate Chart of the Sphere of the Earth") of the same year, the map incorporated Tasman's discoveries. Although the original mosaic had been worn flat, it was reproduced in 1748. This reproduction was left in storage for centuries before being restored after World War II as part of the Royal Palace of Amsterdam. This mosaic was also used as the basis of another mosaic in Canberra, focused specifically on the Australian section of the map of the eastern hemisphere. In addition, Tasman's discoveries subsequently appeared on the map Archipelagus Orientalis sive Asiaticus ("Eastern or Asiatic Archipelago") published in the Kurfürsten Atlas ("Atlas of the Great Elector").

Map Mar di India by Jansson, 1650. This map was produced after Tasman's second voyage in 1644, but it continues to show Dutch discoveries of the north-east and south-west of Australia as unconnected.

Maps from this period and the early 18th century often have Terra Australis or t'Zuid Landt ("the South Land") marked as "New Holland", the name given to the continent by Abel Tasman in 1644. Joan Blaeu's 1659 map shows the clearly recognisable outline of Australia based on the many Dutch explorations during the first half of the 17th century.

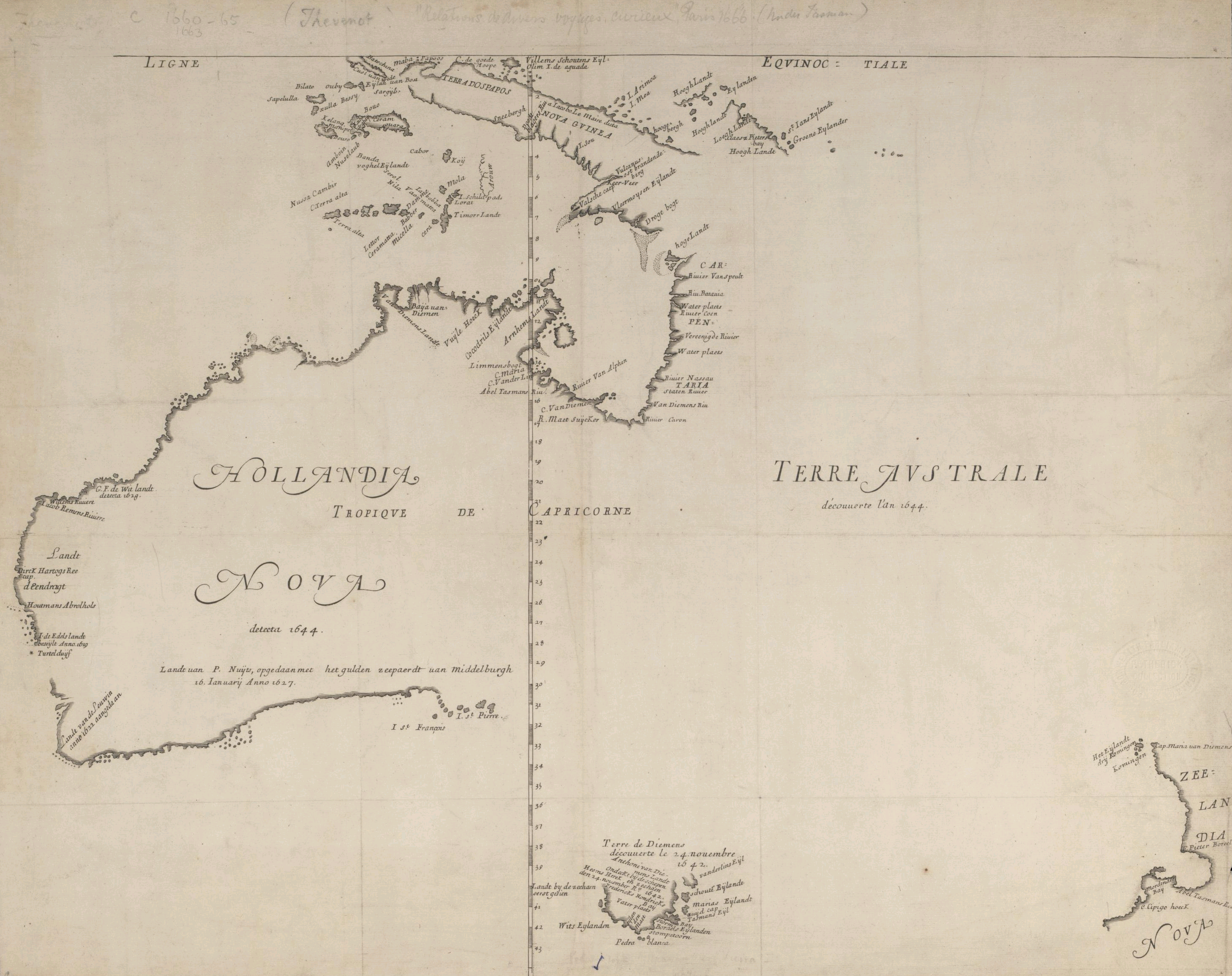
Melchisédech Thévenot's 1664 map Hollandia Nova Detecta 1644, which created a new eastern border for the Dutch claims later exploited by the British Empire

In 1664, the French geographer Melchisédech Thévenot published his collection Relations de Divers Voyages Curieux ("Relations of Various Interesting Voyages"), including a map of New Holland. Thévenot divided the continent into two parts – Nova Hollandia to the west and Terre Australe ("Southern Land") to the east. He divided the continent along a line at 135° east longitude, which appears to have been on his own initiative, because no such division appeared in other sources: in Tasman's journals; on his, Blaeu's, or Amsterdam Burgerzaal's maps; or on any other Dutch maps of this period. Instead, Terra Australis or t'Zuid Landt appeared (if at all) as alternative names, with Hollandia Nova referring to the whole island. (Note: Cf., e.g., the 1650 globe of Arnold van Langren.) This line at 135° east longitude seems to have represented Thévenot's understanding of the Zaragoza Meridian or Tordesillas antimeridian, dividing two areas: the Portuguese East Indies conquered by the Dutch Empire in a protracted conflict throughout the 17th century; and the lands reserved under those treaties for the Spanish Empire and reclaimed by the act of possession of "Austrialia" carried out by Pedro Fernández de Quirós in 1606. This western limit of Spain's claim is shown on the 1761 map of the Spanish Empire, Aspecto Symbolico del Mundo Hispanico ("Symbolic Presentation of the Spanish World"), by Vicente de Memije; the limit played a part in the British claim and division of the territory during the establishment of New South Wales in the late 18th century and Western Australia in the early 19th century.

Summary of 17th-century Dutch exploration
When	Who	Ship(s)	Where
1606	Willem Janszoon	Duyfken	Gulf of Carpentaria, Cape York Peninsula (Queensland)
1616	Dirk Hartog	Eendracht	Shark Bay area, Western Australia
1619	Frederick de Houtman and Jacob d'Edel	Dordrecht and Amsterdam	Land near Perth, Western Australia
1623	Jan Carstensz	Pera and Arnhem	Gulf of Carpentaria, Carpentier River
1627	François Thijssen	het Gulden Zeepaerdt	1800 km of the South Coast (from Cape Leeuwin to Ceduna)
1642–1643	Abel Tasman	Heemskerck and Zeehaen	Van Diemen's Land, later called Tasmania
1696–1697	Willem de Vlamingh	Geelvink, Nyptangh and the Wezeltje	Rottnest Island, Swan River, Dirk Hartog Island (Western Australia)

In 1696, Willem de Vlamingh commanded a rescue mission to Australia's west coast to look for survivors of the Ridderschap van Holland, which had gone missing two years earlier. The mission proved fruitless, but along the way, Vlamingh charted parts of the continent's west coast; as a result, he improved navigation on the Indian Ocean route from the Cape of Good Hope to the Dutch East Indies.

=== Others ===
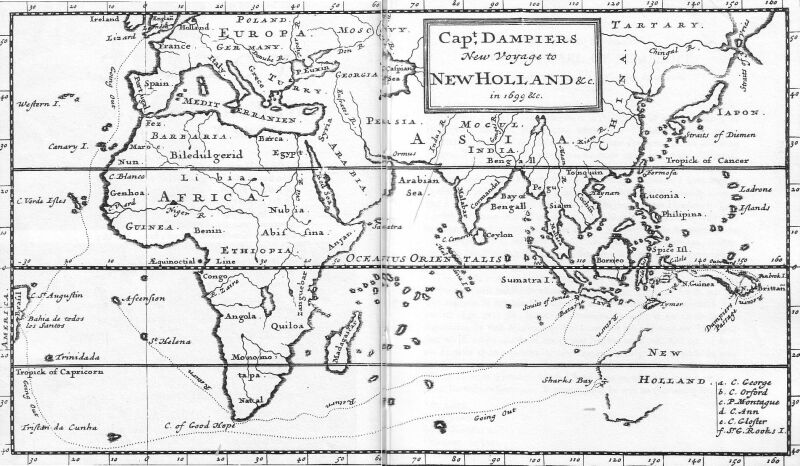
Map of William Dampier's 1699 voyage to New Holland

Englishman William Dampier sailed in search of the Tryall in 1688, 66 years after it was wrecked. Dampier was the first Englishman to set foot on the Australian mainland – on 5 January 1688, when his ship, the Cygnet, was moored in King Sound. While the ship was being careened, he made notes on the local fauna and flora, and he also recorded observations of the Indigenous peoples whom he encountered there. He made another voyage to the region in 1699, before returning to England. He described some of Australia's flora and fauna, and he was the first European to report Australia's peculiar large hopping animals (i.e., kangaroos). Dampier contributed to the knowledge of Australia's coastline through his two-volume publication A Voyage to New Holland (1703, 1709). His book of adventures, A New Voyage around the World, caused a sensation when it was published in English in 1697. Though he was briefly marooned on the northwest Australian coast on the trip described in this book, only his second voyage seems to be important for Australian exploration.

== 18th century ==
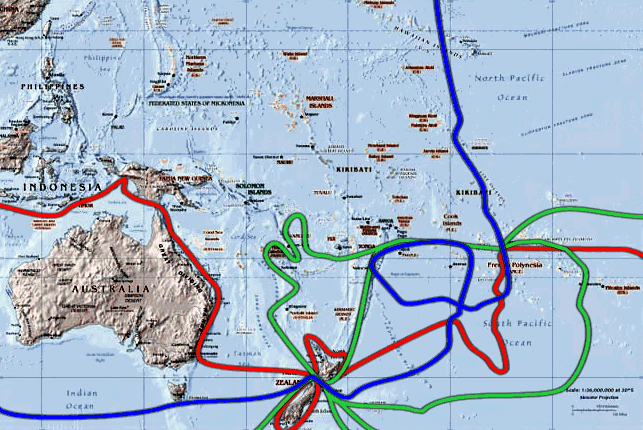
Cook's 1770 voyage is shown in red, and his 1776–1780 voyage is shown in blue.

In 1756, French King Louis XV sent Louis Antoine de Bougainville to look for the southern lands. After a stay in South America and the Falklands, Bougainville reached Tahiti in April 1768, where his ship was surrounded by hundreds of canoes filled with women. "I ask you", he wrote, "given such a spectacle, how could one keep at work 400 Frenchmen?" He claimed Tahiti for the French and sailed westward, past southern Samoa and the New Hebrides; then, on sighting the island of Espiritu Santo, he turned west, still looking for the Southern Continent. On 4 June, he almost ran into heavy breakers, and he needed to change course to the north and east. He had almost found the Great Barrier Reef. He sailed through what is now known as the Solomon Islands which, due to the hostility of the people there, he avoided, until his passage was blocked by a powerful reef. With his men weak from scurvy and disease and no way through, he sailed for Batavia in the Dutch East Indies; there he received news of Wallis and Carteret, who had preceded Bougainville. When he returned to France in 1769, he was the first Frenchman to circumnavigate the globe and the first European known to have seen the Great Barrier Reef. Though he did not reach the mainland of Australia, he did eliminate a considerable area where the southern land was not.

In the meantime, in 1768, British Lieutenant James Cook was sent from England on an expedition to the Pacific Ocean to observe the transit of Venus from Tahiti; he sailed westwards in HMS Endeavour via Cape Horn and arrived there in 1769. On the return voyage, he continued to explore the South Pacific in search of the hypothetical continent of Terra Australis. Cook first reached New Zealand, and then he sailed further westwards to sight the south-eastern corner of the Australian continent on 20 April 1770. In doing so, his was to be the first documented European expedition to reach the east coast of Australia. He continued sailing northwards along the east coast, charting and naming many features along the way. He identified Botany Bay as a good harbour and one potentially suitable for settlement, where he made his first landfall on 29 April. Continuing up the coastline, the Endeavour later ran aground on shoals of the Great Barrier Reef (near the present-day site of Cooktown), where the ship needed to be laid up for repairs. The voyage then recommenced, eventually reaching the Torres Strait. At Possession Island, Cook formally claimed possession of the entire east coast he had just explored for Britain. The expedition then returned to England via the Indian Ocean and the Cape of Good Hope. (Note: For a full record of the log and journals of the entire voyage.)

In 1772, two French expeditions set out to find Terra Australis. The first was led by Marc-Joseph Marion Dufresne, who found and named the Crozet Islands. He spent a few days in Van Diemen's Land (now Tasmania), where he made contact with the island's Indigenous people (as the first European to have done so). In Blackmans Bay, he claimed Van Diemen's Land for France on 5 March 1772. He then sailed on to New Zealand, where he and some crewmen were killed by Māori warriors. The survivors retreated to Mauritius. Also in 1772, the two ships of the second French expedition were separated by a storm. The leader turned back, but the second in command, Louis Aleno de St Aloüarn, sighted Cape Leeuwin and followed the Western Australian coast north to Shark Bay. He landed on Dirk Hartog Island and claimed Western Australia in the name of the French King Louis XV.

Tobias Furneaux in Adventure accompanied James Cook (in Resolution) on Cook's second voyage (1772–1775); this was commissioned by the British government with advice from the Royal Society, to circumnavigate the globe as far south as possible to finally determine whether there was any great southern landmass (or Terra Australis). On this expedition, Furneaux was twice separated from his leader. On the first occasion, in 1773, Furneaux explored a large part of the southern and eastern coasts of Van Diemen's Land, and he made the earliest British chart of these. Most of his place names there have survived. On Cook's third voyage (1776–1780), in 1777, Cook confirmed Furneaux's account and delineation of this area, with certain minor criticisms and emendations; Cook named after Furneaux the Furneaux Group at the eastern entrance to Bass Strait, as well as the group now known as the Low Archipelago.

Cook's first expedition carried botanist Joseph Banks, for whom many Australian geographical features were named, as well as the plant genus Banksia and a number of plant species (e.g., Grevillea banksii). The reports of Cook and Banks – in conjunction with the loss of England's penal colonies in America after they gained independence, as well as growing concern over French activity in the Pacific – encouraged the British to found a colony at Botany Bay. The First Fleet, led by Captain Arthur Phillip, left England on 13 May 1787 to found a penal colony in Australia. It reached Botany Bay in mid-January 1788. Phillip had decided to move the settlement to Sydney Cove in Port Jackson, but the British ships were unable to leave Botany Bay until 26 January because of a severe gale.

Just as Phillip was attempting to move the colony, Jean-François de Galaup, comte de Lapérouse, arrived off Botany Bay on 24 January 1788. (Note: See extract from La Pérouse's journal published in 1799.) The French expedition consisted of two ships led by La Pérouse – the Astrolabe and the Boussole – which were on the latest leg of a three-year voyage. This had taken them from Brest, around Cape Horn, up the coast from Chile to California, north-west to Kamchatka, south-east to Easter Island, north-west to Macao, and on to the Philippines, the Friendly Isles, Hawaii and Norfolk Island. As with the British ships, the gale also prevented La Pérouse's ships from entering Botany Bay. Though amicably received, the French expedition was a troublesome matter for the British, as it demonstrated France's interest in this continent. To preempt a French claim to Norfolk Island, Phillip ordered Lieutenant Philip Gidley King to lead a party of 15 convicts and seven free men to take control of Norfolk Island. They arrived on 6 March 1788, while La Pérouse was still in Sydney.

The British received La Pérouse courteously; each captain, through his officers, offered the other any assistance and needed supplies. La Pérouse spent six weeks in Port Jackson, where the French established an observatory, held Catholic masses, performed geological observations and planted the first garden. Before leaving Sydney on 10 March, La Pérouse took the opportunity to send his journals, some charts and some letters back to Europe with a British naval ship from the First Fleet – the Alexander. Neither La Pérouse nor any of his men were ever seen again. Fortunately, the documents that he dispatched with the Alexander from the in-progress expedition were returned to Paris, where they were published.

In September 1791, the French Assembly decided to send an expedition in search of La Pérouse, and Bruni d'Entrecasteaux was selected to command the expedition. In 1792, d'Entrecasteaux landed near where the town of Esperance in Western Australia is located naming the bay after his ship; he made many more discoveries and named many other places. The expedition suffered multiple difficulties, with d'Entrecasteaux dying of scurvy on 21 July 1793. On 18 February 1794, the expedition vessels were surrendered to the Dutch authorities in the East Indies so that the new French Republican Government could not profit from them. Élisabeth-Paul-Édouard de Rossel, the most senior surviving officer, sailed from Java in January 1795 aboard a Dutch ship, taking along the expedition's papers. The ship left Rossel at Table Bay and continued on with the papers, but it was captured by the British. After the Peace of Amiens in 1802, all of the expedition's papers were returned to Rossel, who was thus able to publish a narrative of the whole enterprise. In 1808, Rossel published the detailed atlas Voyage de d'Entrecasteaux, envoyé à la recherche de Lapérouse, produced by Charles-François Beautemps-Beaupré. This atlas contains 39 charts, with those of Van Diemen's Land being the most detailed; it remained the source of English charts for many years. His expedition also resulted in the publication of the first general flora (or comprehensive plant catalogue) of New Holland.

Summary of 18th-century exploration
When	Captain	Ship(s)	Where
1770	James Cook	HMS Endeavour	East coast of Australia
1773	Tobias Furneaux	HMS Adventure	South and east coasts of Tasmania
1776	James Cook	HMS Resolution	Southern Tasmania
1788	Jean-François de Galaup, comte de Lapérouse	Astrolabe and Boussole	Botany Bay, New South Wales (encountered "First Fleet")

== Later exploration ==
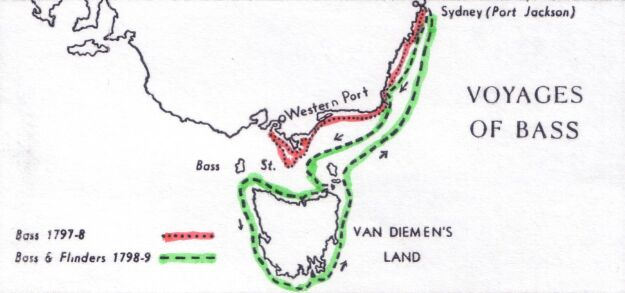
Voyages of George Bass

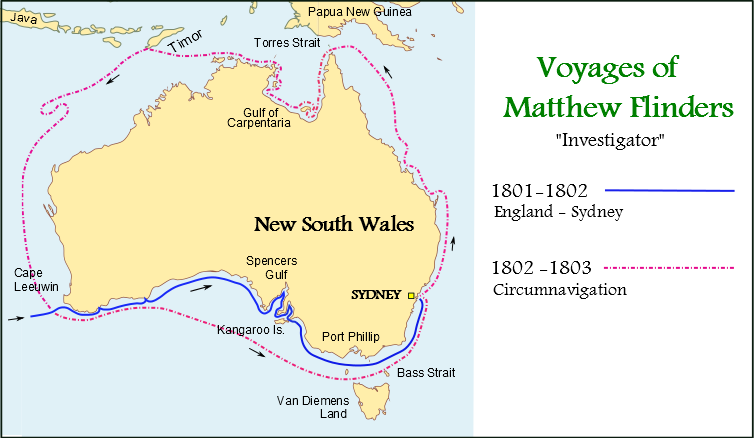
Voyages of Matthew Flinders

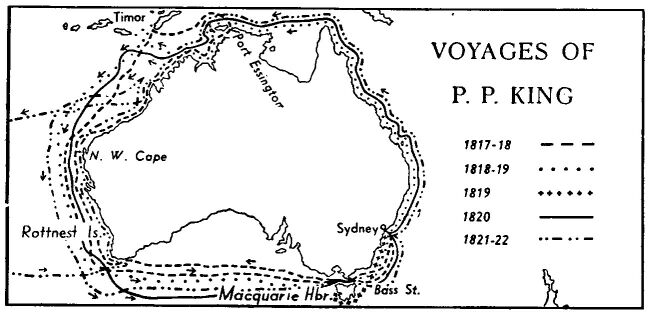
Voyages of Phillip Parker King

In 1796 (after settlement), Britons Matthew Flinders and George Bass took a small open boat, the Tom Thumb 1, and explored some of the coastline south of Sydney. Flinders suspected from this voyage that Tasmania was an island; in 1798, he and Bass led an expedition to circumnavigate it and thereby prove his theory. The sea between mainland Australia and Tasmania was named Bass Strait. One of the two major islands in Bass Strait was later named Flinders Island by Philip Parker King. Flinders returned to England in 1801.

Meanwhile, in October 1800, Frenchman Nicolas Baudin was selected to lead the Baudin expedition to map the coast of Australia/New Holland. He had two ships, Géographe and Naturaliste, captained by Jacques Hamelin, and was accompanied by nine zoologists and botanists, including Jean Baptiste Leschenault de la Tour. Baudin reached Australia in May 1801, the first to explore and map part of the south coast of the continent. The scientific expedition was a great success, with more than 2500 new species described. The French also met Indigenous people and treated them respectfully. Many Western Australian places still bear French names from Baudin's expedition (Peron Peninsula, Depuch Island, Geographe Bay, Cape Naturaliste, Cape Levillain, Boullanger Island and Faure Island). The Australian plant genus Lechenaultia is named after Jean Baptiste Leschenault de la Tour, and Guichenotia after Antoine Guichenot. In April 1802, the Naturaliste under Hamelin explored the area of Western Port, Victoria, and assigned place names, a number of which have survived. Ile des Français is now called French Island.

Flinders' work came to the attention of many scientists of the day, in particular the influential Sir Joseph Banks, to whom Flinders dedicated his book Observations on the Coasts of Van Diemen's Land, on Bass's Strait, etc. Banks used his influence with Earl Spencer to convince the Admiralty that it was important to send an expedition to chart the coastline of New Holland. As a result, in January 1801, Flinders was given command of HMS Investigator, a 334-ton sloop, and promoted to commander the following month.

The Investigator sailed for New Holland on 18 July 1801. Attached to the expedition were the botanist Robert Brown, botanical artist Ferdinand Bauer and landscape artist William Westall. Because the expedition was scientific, Flinders was issued a French passport, despite England and France then being at war. Flinders first sailed along the south coast of Australia to Sydney, and then he completed the circumnavigation of the continent back to Sydney.

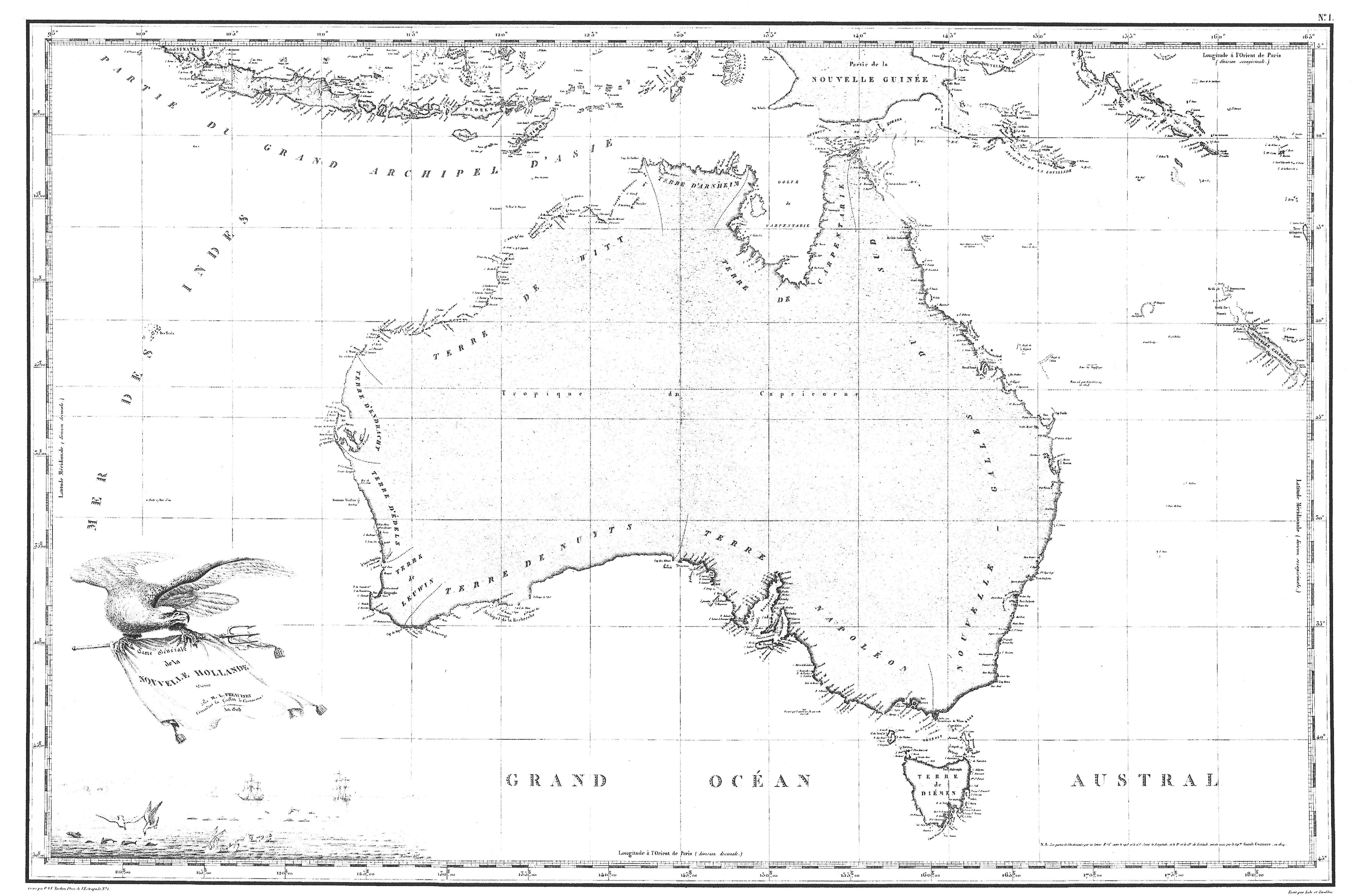
The Freycinet Map of 1811 – the first full map of Australia to be published

While each explorer was charting Australia's coastline, Baudin and Flinders met by chance in April 1802 in Encounter Bay in what is now South Australia. Baudin stopped at the settlement of Sydney for supplies. In Sydney, he bought a new ship, the Casuarina, a smaller vessel which could conduct close inshore survey work, under the command of Louis de Freycinet. He sent home the larger Naturaliste with all the specimens that had been collected by Baudin and his crew. He then headed for Tasmania and conducted further charting of Bass Strait before sailing west, following the west coast northward; after another visit to Timor, he undertook further exploration along the north coast of Australia. Plagued by contrary winds and ill health, it was decided on 7 July 1803 to return to France. The expedition stopped at Mauritius, where he died of tuberculosis on 16 September 1803. The expedition finally returned to France on 24 March 1804. According to researchers from the University of Adelaide, during this expedition, Baudin prepared a report for Napoleon on ways to invade and capture the British colony at Sydney Cove.

The British suspected that the reason for Baudin's expedition was to establish a French colony on the coast of New Holland. In response, two ships – HMS Lady Nelson and the whaler Albion, both under the direction of Lieutenant John Bowen – sailed from Port Jackson on 31 August 1803 to establish a settlement in Van Diemen's Land. On 10 October 1803, a convoy of two ships – HMS Calcutta and Ocean, led by Captain David Collins, carrying 402 people – entered Port Phillip and formed a settlement near Sorrento. The first Britons to enter the bay were the crews of Lady Nelson, commanded by John Murray and, ten weeks later, the Investigator, commanded by Flinders, in 1802.

The Investigator was declared unseaworthy, so in 1803, Flinders was compelled to return to England as a passenger on Porpoise (1799), together with his charts and logbooks. The vessel stopped in Mauritius, with Flinders thinking that he would be safe because of the scientific nature of his voyages, though England and France were then at war. However, the governor of Mauritius kept Flinders in prison for six and a half years. As a result, the first published map of Australia's full outline was the Freycinet Map of 1811, a product of Baudin's expedition. This map preceded the publication of Flinders' map of Australia, Terra Australis or Australia, by three years. In 1814, Flinders also published his account of the voyage in A Voyage to Terra Australis, which was published just before his death at the age of 40.

Summary of later exploration
When	Who	Ship(s)	Where
1796	Matthew Flinders	Tom Thumb	Coastline around Sydney
1798	Matthew Flinders and George Bass	Norfolk	Circumnavigated Tasmania
1801–1802	Nicolas Baudin, accompanied by Thomas Vasse and numerous naturalists (see below)	Le Géographe and Le Naturaliste	The first to explore the western coast; met Flinders at Encounter Bay
1801	John Murray	Lady Nelson	Bass Strait; discovery of Port Phillip
1802	Matthew Flinders	Investigator	Circumnavigation of Australia
1817	King expedition of 1817 – Phillip Parker King accompanied by Frederick Bedwell	Mermaid	Circumnavigation of Australia; charting of the north-western coasts

== See also ==
- Aboriginal Australians
- Age of Discovery
- Dieppe maps
- European land exploration of Australia
- Indigenous Australians
- Jave la Grande
- History of cartography
- History of geography
- History of Australia
- Terra Australis
- Terra incognita

== Sources ==
- Baudin, Nicolas (1974). The Journal of Post Captain Nicolas Baudin, Commander-in-Chief of the Corvettes Géographe and Naturaliste; Assigned by Order of the Government to a Voyage of Discovery. Translated by Christine Cornell. Libraries Board of South Australia. ISBN 9780724300433.
- Heeres, Jan Ernst (1899). The Part Borne by the Dutch in the Discovery of Australia 1606-1765 (in Dutch and English). Leiden, London: Brill Publishers. hdl:2027/njp.32101073851337. LCCN 05012045. OCLC 13214159. OL 52349613M. Wikidata Q133908667.
- Sigmond, J. P.; Zuiderbaan, L. H. (1976). Dutch Discoveries of Australia. Rigby Australia. ISBN 0-7270-0800-5.
