= Voyage of the Pera and Arnhem to Australia in 1623 =

Dutch East India Company exploration

Pera and Arnhem were two ships from the Dutch East India Company (Dutch: Vereenigde Oost-Indische Companie abbreviated to VOC) that explored the north Australian coast in 1623. Arnhem Land is named after Arnhem, while the ship itself was named after the Dutch city Arnhem.

== Purpose ==
The yacht Pera, captained by Jan Carstenszoon, and the smaller vessel Arnhem, captained by Willem Joosten van Colster (or Coolsteerdt) sailed from Ambon Island (Amboyna) on 21 January 1623 with instructions to undertake treaty negotiations with the "natives of Quey, Aroe and Tenimber", and to further explore "Nova Guinea", particularly the part of Australia sighted and charted by Willem Janszoon during his voyage on Duyfken in 1606.

== Course ==
After travelling along the south coast of New Guinea, they then made for Cape York Peninsula and the Gulf of Carpentaria. On 14 April 1623, they sailed past Cape Keerweer, the most southerly point reached by Duyfken. Landing in search of fresh water for his stores, Carstenszoon first encountered a party of the Wik peoples. Persistent attempts by the Dutch to kidnap Wik men provoked aggressive responses and probably led to a skirmish with 200 Wik warriors at the mouth of small river he named as the Carpentier River, (Note: Possibly the Edward or Mitchell Rivers.) near Cape Duyfken.

Carstenszoon reached the Staaten River before heading north again. From here Pera and Carstenszoon returned to Ambon, while Arnhem crossed the Gulf of Carpentaria, sighting the east coast of Arnhem Land.

== Significance ==
The voyage by Pera and Arnhem was the tenth contact with Australia, as catalogued in the Landings List compiled by the Australia on the Map Division of the Australasian Hydrographic Society. A more detailed charting of the Gulf of Carpentaria and Arnhem Land was undertaken by Abel Tasman in 1644.
