= Janszoon voyage of 1605–1606 =

European voyage of discovery to Australia

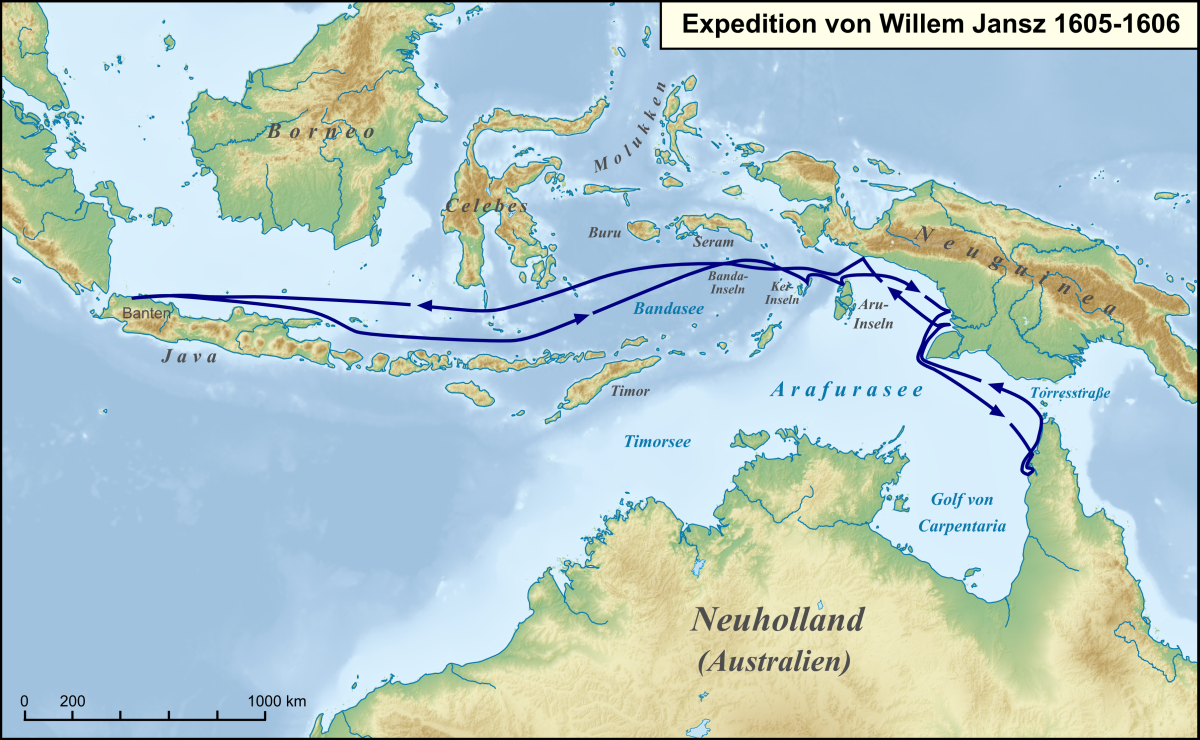
Map of the voyage of Willem Janszoon in 1605–1606

Willem Janszoon captained the first recorded European landing on the Australian continent in 1606, sailing Duyfken from Bantam, Java. As an employee of the Dutch East India Company (Dutch: Vereenigde Oostindische Compagnie or VOC), Janszoon had been instructed to explore the coast of New Guinea in search of economic opportunities. He had originally arrived in the Dutch East Indies from the Netherlands in 1598, and became an officer of the VOC on its establishment in 1602.

In 1606, he sailed from Bantam to the south coast of New Guinea, and continued down what he thought was a southern extension of that coast, but was in fact the western coast of the Cape York Peninsula of northern Queensland. He travelled south as far as Cape Keerweer, where he battled with the local Aboriginal people and several of his men were killed. As a consequence, he was obliged to retrace his route up the coast towards Cape York and then returned to Banda.

Janszoon did not detect the existence of the Torres Strait, which separates Australia and New Guinea. Unknown to the Dutch, explorer Luís Vaz de Torres, working for the Spanish Crown, sailed through the strait only four months later. However, Torres did not report seeing the coast of a major landmass to his south and is therefore presumed not to have seen Australia. Because the two separate observations of Janszoon and Torres were not matched, Dutch maps did not include the strait until after James Cook's 1770 passage through it, while early Spanish maps showed the coast of New Guinea correctly, but omitted Australia.

Overall, his voyage was not immediately recognized as significant at the time, as the Dutch East India Company was primarily interested in finding a faster route to the Spice Islands. However, Janszoon's voyage paved the way for further exploration of the Australian continent by the Dutch and other European powers.

== Voyage ==
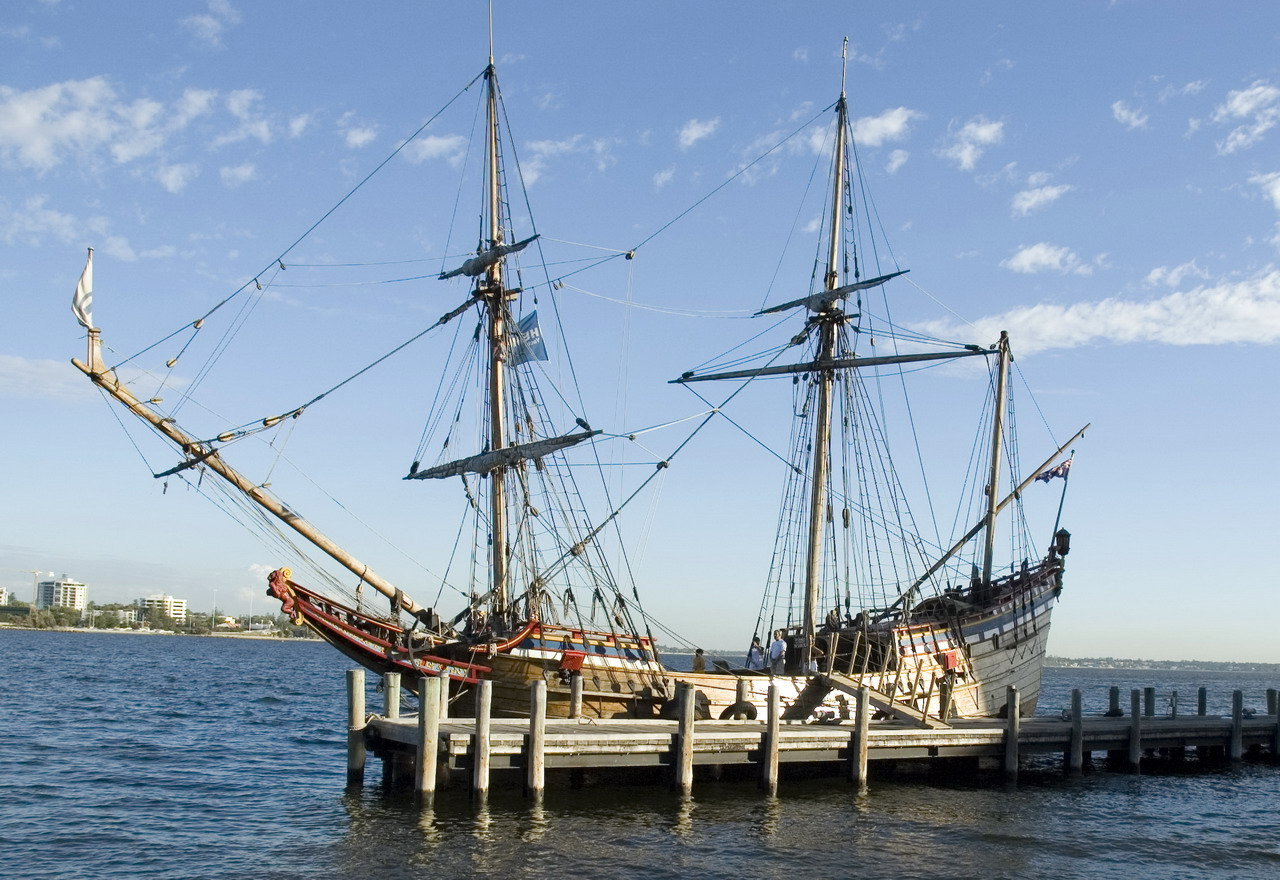
Duyfken replica on the Swan River in 2006

Janszoon travelled to the Dutch East Indies in 1598 for the Oude compagnies and became an officer of the Dutch East India Company (Vereenigde Oost-Indische Compagnie abbreviated to VOC in Dutch) when it was established in 1602. After two trips back to the Netherlands, he returned to the East Indies for the third time in 1603 as captain of the pinnace Duyfken. In 1605, he was at Banda in the Banda Islands, when—according to an account given to Abel Jansen Tasman, issued in Batavia on 29 January 1644—he was ordered by VOC President Jan Willemsz Verschoor to explore the coast of New Guinea. In September 1605, he left for Bantam in west Java—which the VOC had established as its first permanent trading in 1603—so that Duyfken could be fitted out and supplied for its voyage.

On 18 November 1605, Duyfken sailed from Bantam to the coast of western New Guinea. Although all records of the voyage have been lost, Janszoon's departure was reported by Captain John Saris. He recorded that on 18 November 1605 "a small Dutch pinnace departed here for the discovery of the island called New Guinea, which, it is said, may yield a great amount of wealth". (Note: This is a transliteration of: "The eighteenth, heere departed a small Pinnasse of the Flemmings, for the discovery of the Iland called Nova ginnea, which, as it is said, affordeth great store of Gold.")

No original logs or charts of Janszoon's voyage have been located and it is not known when or how they were lost. Nevertheless, a copy was apparently made in about 1670 from Janszoon's map of his expedition, which was sold to the Austrian National Library in Vienna in 1737. It can be deduced from this map that Janszoon then sailed to Ambon (the headquarters of the VOC), Banda, the Kai Islands, the Aru Islands and Deyong Point on the coast of Papua.

After exploring the coast of Papua, Duyfken rounded Vals Point and crossed the eastern end of the Arafura Sea—without seeing the Torres Strait—into the Gulf of Carpentaria, and on 26 February 1606 made landfall at a river on the western shore of Cape York Peninsula in Queensland, near the modern town of Weipa. Janszoon named the river R. met het Bosch, but it is now known as the Pennefather River. (Note: 12°13′S 141°44′E) This is the first recorded European landfall on the Australian continent. He proceeded over Albatross Bay to Archer Bay, (Note: 13°16′S 141°39′E) the confluence of the Archer and the Watson Rivers, which he named Dubbelde Rev (lit. 'double river') and then on to Dugally River, which he named the Visch (lit. 'fish').

=== Turnback ===
According to the VOC's instructions to Tasman (1644), Janszoon and his crew travelled along 350 kilometres (220 mi) of coast, from 5° south to 13° 45' south, but found that:

vast regions were for the greater part uncultivated, and certain parts inhabited by savage, cruel black barbarians who slew some of our sailors, so that no information was obtained touching the exact situation of the country and regarding the commodities obtainable and in demand there.

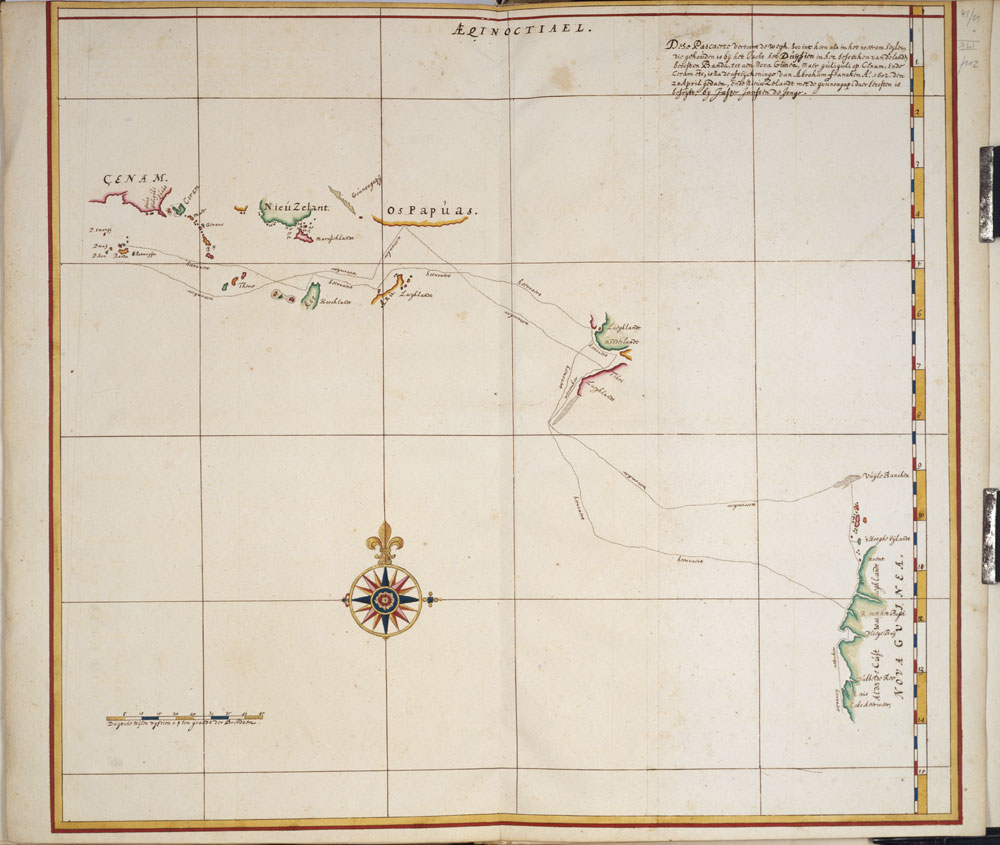
1670 copy of the map drawn on board Duyfken

He found the land to be swampy and infertile, forcing the explorers eventually to give up and return to Bantam due to their lack of "provisions and other necessaries". Nevertheless, it appears that the killing of some of his men on various shore expeditions was the main reason for their return—he turned back where his party had its greatest conflict with Aboriginal people, which he subsequently called Kaap Keerweer, (Note: 13°55′S 141°28′E) Dutch for 'Cape Turnback'.

Cape Keerweer is on the lands of the Wik-Mungkan Aboriginal people, who today live in various outstations and in the nearby Aurukun Mission station. The book Mapoon, written by members of the Wik-Mungkan people and edited by Janine Roberts, contains an account of this landing passed down in Aboriginal oral history:

The Europeans sailed along from overseas and put up a building at Cape Keerweer. A crowd of Keerweer people saw their boat sail up and went to talk with them. They said they wanted to put up a city. Well the Keerweer people said that was all right. They allowed them to sink a well and put up huts. They were at first happy there and worked together. The Europeans gave them tobacco. They carried off the tobacco. They gave them flour—they threw that away. They gave them soap, and they threw away the soap. The Keerweer people kept to their own bush tucker.

According to this account, some of Janszoon's crew angered the local people, by raping or coercing women into having sex and by forcing men to hunt for them. This led the locals to kill some of the Dutch and burn some of their boats. The Dutch are said to have shot and killed many of the Keerweer people before escaping. However, events from a number of different encounters, over many years, with Europeans may have been combined in these oral traditions.

There is documented evidence suggesting that during this voyage, the Dutch landed near Mapoon and on Prince of Wales Island, with the map showing a dotted trajectory line to that island, but not to Cape Keerweer.

=== Return to Banda ===
After the alleged conflict, Janszoon retraced his route north to the north side of Vliege Bay, which Matthew Flinders called Duyfken Point in 1802. He then passed his original landfall at Pennefather River and continued to the river now called Wenlock River. This river was formerly called the Batavia River, due to an error made in the chart made by the Carstenszoon 1623 expedition. According to Carstenszoon, the Batavia River was a large river, which in 1606 "the men of the yacht Duijfken went up with the boat, on which occasion one of them was killed by the arrows of the natives".

Janszoon then proceeded past Skardon, (Note: 11°46′S 142°00′E) Vrilya Point, (Note: 11°14′S 142°07′E) Crab Island, (Note: 10°58′S 142°06′E) Wallis Island, (Note: 10°51′S 142°01′E) Red Wallis Island (Note: 10°52′S 142°02′E) to t Hooge Eylandt (lit. 'the high island', now called Muralug Island or Prince of Wales Island), (Note: 10°41′S 142°11′E) on which some of them landed. The expedition then passed Badu Island (Note: 10°07′S 142°09′E) to the Vuyle Bancken, the continuous coral reefs between Mabuiag Island (Note: 09°57′S 142°10′E) and New Guinea.

Janszoon then sailed back to Banda via the south coast of New Guinea. On 15 June 1606, Captain Saris reported the arrival of (Note: This is a transliteration of: "Nockhoda Tingall a Cling-man from Banda, in a Java Juncke, laden with Mace and Nutmegs, the which he sold heere to the Guzerats [...]: he told me that the Flemmings Pinnasse which went upon discovery for Nova Ginny, was returned to Banda, having found the Iland: but in sending their men on shoare to intreate of Trade, there were nine of them killed by the Heathens, which are man-eaters: so they were constrained to returne, finding no good to be done there.")

... Nockhoda Tingall, a Tamil from Banda, in a Javanese junk, laden with mace and nutmegs, which he sold to the Gujaratis; he told me that the Dutch pinnace that went to explore New Guinea had returned to Banda, having found it: but in sending their men on shore to propose trade, nine of them were killed by the heathens, who are man-eaters: so they were forced to return, finding no good to be done there.

A reference to the outcome of the expedition was made as a result of Willem Schouten's 1615 voyage on behalf of the Australische Compagnie from the Netherlands to the Spice Islands via Cape Horn. The VOC sought an order from the Dutch Government prohibiting the Australische Compagnie from operating between Ceylon and 100 miles (160 km) east of the Solomon Islands. In 1618, it presented a memorandum in pursuit of this order that included the following:

... seeing that the United East-India Company has repeatedly given orders for the discovering and exploring the land of Nova Guinea, and the islands east of the same, since, equally by our orders, such discovery was once tried about the year 1606 with the yacht de Duyve by Skipper Willem Jansz and sub-cargo Jan Lodewijs van Rosinghijn, who made sundry discoveries on the said coast of Nova Guinea, as is amply set forth in their journals.

== Torres Strait ==
Willem Janszoon returned to the Netherlands apparently in the belief that the south coast of New Guinea was joined to the land along which he sailed, although his own chart did not verify his claim to have continuously followed the coastline where the Torres Strait is found.

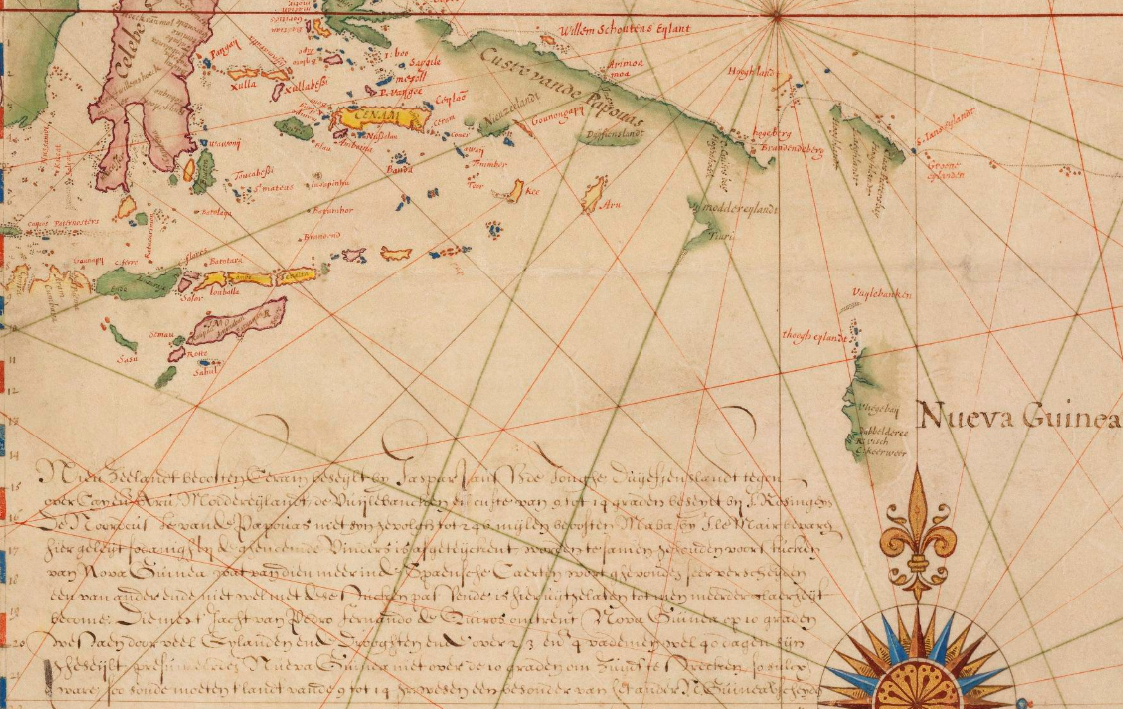
Nieu Zeelandt and Nueva Guinea on Hessel Gerritsz, Mar del Sur, 1622. The inscription, translated, reads: "Nieu Zeelandt, east of Ceram, sailed by Jaspar Janss. the Younger; Duyfjesland [the land of the Dovekin], opposite Key and Aru, Moddereyland (Mud-island), the Vuylebanken (the Shoals), the coast from 9 to 14 degrees, sailed by J. Rosingeyn; the north coast of the Papouas with its continuation to 246 Dutch miles east of Maba, navigated by J. le Maire, here placed as is delineated by the said discoverers, are looked together upon parts of Nova Guinea. What is found thereabouts in the Spanish maps and differs greatly from this and does not agree on these parts, is here omitted until we are better informed. Those who sailed with the yacht of Pedro Fernando de Quiros in the neighbourhood of Nueva Guinea to 10 degrees westward through many islands and shoals and over 2, 3 and 4 fathoms for as many as 40 days, estimated that New Guinea does not extend beyond 10 degrees to the south. If this be so, then the land from 9 to 14 degrees would be a separate land, different from the other N. Guinea."

In 1622, prior to Jan Carstenszoon's 1623 exploration of the Gulf of Carpentaria, Hessel Gerritsz published a map, which included the coastline of part of the west coast of Cape York. Although this map shows this coast as an extension of New Guinea, it includes a note that refers to Spanish maps that differed from the Dutch understanding of the area. It noted that while the Spanish maps were inconsistent with each other, they would, if confirmed, imply that New Guinea did not extend more than 10 degrees south, "then the land from 9 to 14 degrees must be separate and different from the other New Guinea". The Spanish maps would have reflected Luis Váez de Torres's voyage through the strait named after him, which he completed in early October 1606, although the Dutch knew nothing of it.

Both Carstenszoon in 1623 and Tasman in 1644 were directed to attempt to find a passage in the area of Torres Strait, but failed. Following these explorations, the Dutch continued to wonder whether there was a passage:

The Drooge bocht (lit. 'shallow bay'), where Nova-Guinea is surmised to be cut off from the rest of the Southland by a passage opening into the great South-Sea, though our men have been unable to pass through it owing to the shallows, so that it remains uncertain whether this strait is open on the other side.

— G. E. Rumphius, an officer of the VOC, some time after 1685.

However, some Dutch maps, but not others like Gerritszoon's map of 1622, still showed Cape York and New Guinea as being contiguous, until James Cook, who was aware of Torres' voyage through Alexander Dalrymple, sailed through the strait on his first voyage in 1770.

== Sources ==
- Davies, Norman (2017). Beneath Another Sky: A Global Journey into History. Penguin Books Limited. ISBN 978-1-84614-832-3. Archived from the original on 9 February 2024.
- Forsyth, J. W. (1967). "Janssen, Willem (fl. 1603–1628)". Australian Dictionary of Biography. Australian National University.
- Gerritsen, Rolf (2015). "Mapping the Discoveries of Australia's First Mariners". Journal of the Australian and New Zealand Map Society. 45.
- Gerritsz, Hessel (1622). Map of the Pacific Ocean. Archived from the original on 8 November 2015 – via département des Cartes et Plans, SH, Arch. 30, Bibliothèque Nationale de France, Paris.
- Heeres, J. E. (1965) [1898]. Abel Janszoon Tasman's Journal. Amsterdam; Los Angeles: Royal Dutch Geographical Society, Project Gutenberg of Australia. p. 163.
- Heeres, Jan Ernst (3 January 2006) [1899]. Choat, Colin (ed.). The Part Borne by the Dutch in the Discovery of Australia 1606-1765. Project Gutenberg Australia. Wikidata Q132175190.
- Heeres, J.E. (1899). "The discovery of Australia by the Dutch in 1606". The Geographical Journal.
- Hendersen, James (1999). Sent Forth a Dove: Discovery of the Duyfken. Perth: University of WA Press.
- Mutch, Thomas Davies (1942). The First Discovery of Australia; With an Account of the Voyage of the "Duyfken" and the Career of Captain Willem Jansz. Sydney: Thomas Davies Mutch. OCLC 1058014886. Archived from the original on 14 February 2020 – via Project Gutenberg Australia.
- Roberts, Janine P.; McLean, D., eds. (1975). The Cape York Aluminium Companies and the Native Peoples. The Mapoon Story. Vol. 3. Fitzroy, Victoria: International Development Action. ISBN 978-0959858846. OCLC 1178543716.
- Roberts, Janine P. (1981). From Massacres to Mining. Blackburn, Victoria: Dove Communications. ISBN 978-0-85924-171-7.
- Saris, John (1625). Purchas, Samuel (ed.). "Chapter 2: English Voyages to the East-Indies". Purchas His Pilgrimes. 1 (2, The second Booke) (4th ed.). London: Samuel Purchas: 385. LCCN 06002669. OCLC 766940367. "The eighteenth, heere departed a small Pinnasse of the Flemmings, for the discovery of the Iland called Noua ginnea, which, as it is said, affordeth great store of Gold."
- Siebenhaar, W. (January 1918). "Dirk Hartogs' Landing in Australia". Scottish Geographical Magazine. Vol. XXXIV, no. I.
