= Jan Carstenszoon =

17th century Dutch explorer of New Guinea and Australia

Jan Carstenszoon or more commonly Jan Carstensz (Note: In Dutch, patronyms ending in -szoon were almost universally abbreviated to -sz.) was a 17th-century Dutch explorer. In 1623, Carstenszoon was commissioned by the Dutch East India Company to lead an expedition to the southern coast of New Guinea and beyond, to follow up the reports of land sighted further south in the 1606 voyages of Willem Janszoon aboard Duyfken.

Setting sail from Ambon in the Dutch East Indies with two ships, the yacht Pera (captained by Carstenszoon) and Arnhem (captained by Willem Joosten van Colster), the ships travelled along the south coast of New Guinea, then headed south to Cape York Peninsula and the Gulf of Carpentaria. On 14 April 1623, Cape Keerweer was passed. Landing in search of fresh water for his stores, Carstenszoon encountered a party of the local indigenous Australian inhabitants. Carstenszoon described them as "utter barbarians" who had no knowledge of precious metals or spices.

On 8 May 1623, Carstenszoon and his crew fought a skirmish with 200 Aboriginal people at the mouth of a small river near Cape Duyfken (named after Janszoon's vessel which had earlier visited the region) and landed at the Pennefather River. Carstenszoon named the small river Carpentier River, and the Gulf of Carpentaria in honour of Pieter de Carpentier, at that time Governor-General of the Dutch East Indies. Carstenszoon reached the Staaten River before heading north again. Carstenszoon aboard Pera returned to Ambon while Arnhem crossed the Gulf of Carpentaria, sighting the east coast of Arnhem Land.

Carstensz Pyramid in Irian Jaya, Indonesia was named after Carstenszoon. He sighted the glaciers on the peak of the mountain in 1623 and called it Sneebergh ('snow mountain'); he was ridiculed in Europe when he said he had seen snow near the equator. Carstenszoon also named several other features along Australia's north coast.

== See also ==
- European exploration of Australia

== Sources ==
- Feeken, Erwin H.J.; Feeken, Gerda E.E. (1970). The Discovery and Exploration of Australia. Melbourne: Nelson. ISBN 0-17-001812-1.
- Serle, Percival (1949). "CARSTENSZ or CARSTENSZOON, JAN (15??-16??), called Jan Carstens in the Dutch dictionary of biography". Dictionary of Australian Biography. Project Gutenberg Australia. LCCN 49006289. OCLC 1956219. OL 7423467W. Wikidata Q5273962.
- Jose, Arthur Wilberforce (1928). Builders and Pioneers of Australia. Internet Archive. London: J. M. Dent & Sons.
