= Carpentier River =

Location
- Country: Australia
- Location: Queensland

The Carpentier River, on the Cape York Peninsula in Queensland, Australia was named in honour of Pieter de Carpentier, Governor-General of the Dutch East Indies. The name was conferred by Jan Carstenszoon in 1623. There is now no river in Northern Queensland with that name. See the entry for Pennefather River for details.

== See also ==
- List of rivers of Australia
