= Pieter de Carpentier =

Dutch East India Company administrator

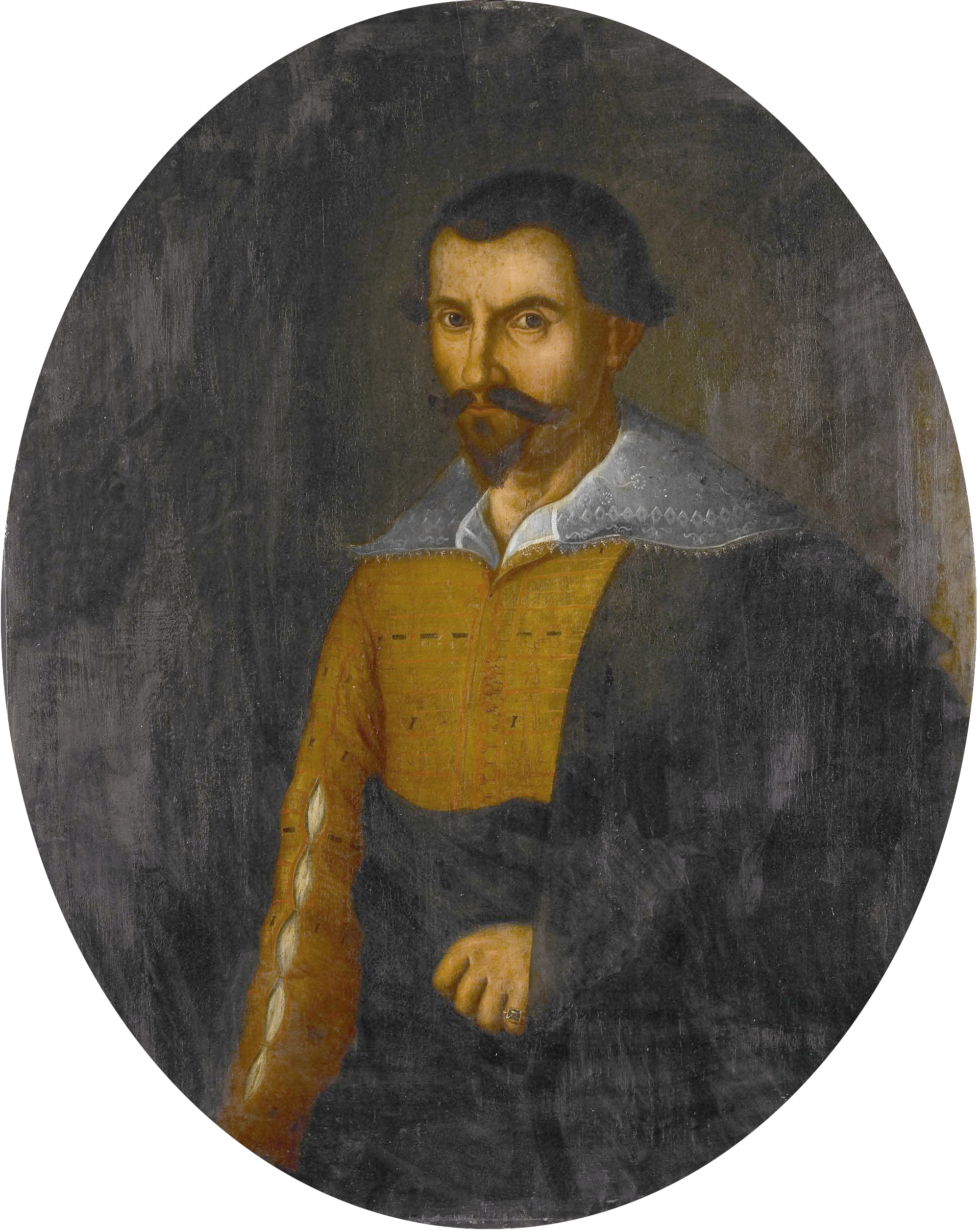
- Portrait of Pieter de Carpentier by an unknown artist. Rijksmuseum, Amsterdam. (Note: The original oil painting of this gravure is hanging in The Hague in one of the buildings of the governmental heart of The Netherlands, the Binnenhof.)

5th Governor-General of the Dutch East Indies
- In office 1 February 1623 – 30 September 1627
- Preceded by: Jan Pieterszoon Coen
- Succeeded by: Jan Pieterszoon Coen

Personal details
- Born: 19 February 1586 Antwerp, Spanish Netherlands
- Died: 5 September 1659 (aged 73) Amsterdam, Dutch Republic

Pieter de Carpentier (19 February 1586 – 5 September 1659) was a Dutch administrator of the Dutch East India Company (VOC) who served as Governor-General of the Dutch East Indies from 1623 to 1627. The Gulf of Carpentaria in northern Australia is named after him.

Pieter de Carpentier was born in Antwerp in 1586, shortly after the fall of the city to the Spaniards. He studied philosophy in Leiden, from 1603. In 1616 he sailed on board the sailing vessel De Getrouwheid to Indonesia. There he had a number of functions, including Director-General of the Trade, Member to the Council of the Indies, and member of the Council of Defence. From 1 February 1623 to 30 September 1627 he was the fifth Governor-General of the Dutch East Indies. He participated in the conquest of Jakarta and helped to build the town of Batavia. He did much for the town, including setting up a school, a Town Hall, and the first Orphanage Home. He also designed the structure of the churches in the town.

On 12 November 1627 Pieter de Carpentier sailed from the East Indies as Head of the Fleet. He arrived in Holland on 3 June 1628, with five richly-laden merchant ships, and this, combined with the fact that the Government had recently succeeded in releasing three ships from an embargo laid upon them by the English a year previously, led the authorities to determine to send another fleet of eleven ships to the East, with which General Jacob Specks was to sail. Two ships and a yacht being soon ready to sail, the senate sent them to Texel so as to lose no time. These vessels were the Batavia (under Francisco Pelsaert) the Dordrecht (under Isaac van Swaenswyck) and the Assendelft (under Cornelis Vlack). They left Texel for their destination on 28 October 1628.

De Carpentier was made member of the board of the Dutch East India Company (VOC) in October 1629. His maternal uncle, Louis Delbeecque, had been one of the initiators of the VOC.

Pieter de Carpentier married Maria Ravevelt in Middelburg on 2 March 1630. She died in September 1641 and was buried on in the Westerkerk in Amsterdam. De Carpentier died in Amsterdam on 5 September 1659, and was also buried in the Westerkerk. They had seven children. One of their daughters, Agnita de Carpentier, married Ernst, brother of Coenraad van Klenck.

When Jan Carstenszoon (or Carstensz) and Willem van Coolsteerdt landed the Pera and the Arnhem on the west coast of Cape York Peninsula of New Holland (now Australia) in 1623, after the first discovery by Willem Janszoon in the Duyfken in 1606, they then named the Gulf of Carpentaria after the Governor-General, Pieter de Carpentier.

== General references ==
- Battye, James Sykes (March 2005) [1924]. "Chapter 1". In Asscher, Sue (ed.). Western Australia: A History from its Discovery to the Inauguration of the Commonwealth. Project Gutenberg of Australia. Wikidata Q126159134.
- Carpentier Wolf, Jaap de (n.d.). n.t.
