= Willem Janszoon =

Dutch navigator and colonial governor (c. 1570 – c. 1630)

- Born: c. 1570; Amsterdam, Spanish Netherlands
- Died: c. 1630 (aged around 60)
- Other names: Willem Jansz.; Willem Jansz
- Occupations: Navigator and colonial governor
- Known for: European discovery of Australia

Willem Janszoon (Dutch: [ˈʋɪləm ˈjɑnszoːn]; c. 1570 – c. 1630) was a Dutch navigator and colonial governor. He served in the Dutch East Indies in the periods 1603–1611 and 1612–1616, including as governor of Fort Henricus on the island of Solor. During his voyage of 1605–1606, Janszoon and his crew became the first Europeans known to have seen and land on the coast of Australia.

His name is sometimes abbreviated to Willem Jansz, (Note: Both without and with the abbreviating period.) (Note: The patronymic Janszoon means 'son of Jan', or 'son of Johannes' (Janszoon in Dutch). In the early seventeenth century, this was in some dialects probably pronounced the same as Jansen, a name equivalent to Johnson in English. Surnames were usually not used, and children were simply named for their father's given name. In areas where not many people lived, but also in towns and cities, he would simply be given the name Willem Janszoon; thus, all that is known about him is that his father's name was Johannes or Jan. As in many countries, genealogical and historical research in the Netherlands can be difficult for this reason.) as was customary at his time, but "always pronounced in full and generally still is in the Netherlands where this bit of common knowledge is taught at school." However, the abbreviation Jansz is not the same as the now more predominant unabbreviated but identical Jansz that is a petrified form of Janszoon. (Note: Since the Napoleonic era, petrified (or frozen) patronymic forms of Janszoon, such as Jansz, Jansen, Janssen and Janzen, have become more predominant than Janszoon. However, this happened subsequent to the 17th century, and therefore these shorter and unabbreviated names are not names from the early 17th century.)

== Early life ==
Willem Janszoon was born around 1570 as the son of Jan (c. 1540), but nothing more is known of his early life nor of his parents. He is first recorded as having entered into the service of the Oude compagnie, one of the predecessors of the Dutch East India Company (VOC), in 1598 as a mate aboard Hollandia, part of the second fleet under Jacob Corneliszoon van Neck, dispatched by the Dutch to the Dutch East Indies. Around 1600 he became the father of Jan Willemsz before setting sail again on 5 May 1601, for the East Indies as master of Lam, one of three ships in the fleet of Joris van Spilbergen.

Janszoon sailed from the Netherlands for the East Indies for the third time on 18 December 1603, as captain of Duyfken (or Duijfken, meaning 'little dove'), one of twelve ships of the great fleet of Steven van der Hagen.

== Exploration and discovery ==
=== First voyage to Australia ===
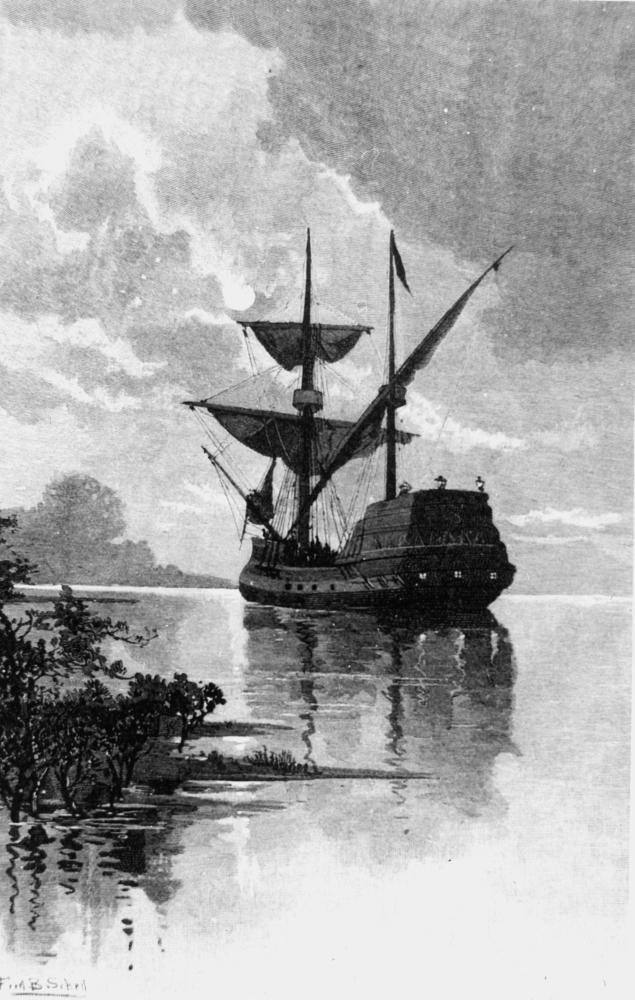
19th-century artist impression of the ship Duyfken in the Gulf of Carpentaria

According to historian J. E. Heeres, Duyfken departed from Bantam on 18 November 1605 (on the Julian calendar, and 28 November on to the Gregorian calendar), based on a contemporary account by John Saris:

The eighteenth November 1605 … heere (Bantam) departed a small Pinnasse of the Flemmings, for the discovery of the Land called Nova Guinea which, as it is said, affordeth great store of Gold [...].

The ship's log and diary of Janszoon are lost, but what remains is his chart of the voyage. From this we know the journey included passages from Bantam to the Banda Islands, then to the Kai Islands, Aru Islands, and then eventually to the coast of western New Guinea, the location of what is today's region of Pulau Yos Sudarso.

After that, Janszoon crossed the eastern end of the Arafura Sea into the Gulf of Carpentaria, without being aware of the existence of Torres Strait. Duyfken was actually in Torres Strait in February 1606, a few months before Spanish explorer Luís Vaz de Torres sailed through it. On 26 February 1606, Janszoon made landfall at the Pennefather River on the western shore of Cape York in Queensland, near what is now the town of Weipa. This is the first recorded European landfall on the Australian continent. Janszoon proceeded to chart some 320 kilometres (200 mi) of the coastline, which he thought was a southerly extension of New Guinea.

Janszoon decided to return at a place he named Kaap Keerweer (lit. 'Cape Return', the name persists as Cape Keerweer), south of Albatross Bay. On his return north he explored the mouth of the Batavia River, what is today called the Ducie River, and although not having been named by Janszoon, it can be identified on his charts.

Information pieced together from Jan Carstenszoon's journal from 1623, which alludes to contemporary knowledge of Janszoon's 1606 voyage, suggests that the crew went ashore several times to seek information about the land, its peoples and opportunities to trade. Cartenszoon noted a conflict between the Aboriginal people and crew of the Duyfken:

on the 11th [of May] we sailed close inshore past a large river [...] which in 1606 the men of the yacht Duijfken went up with the boat, on which occasion one of them was killed [...].

In addition, upon the return of an Indian captain from Banda who relayed the story of "the Flemmings Pinasse" second-hand to John Saris, nine crew were killed in total over the voyage,

which went upon discovery of Nova Ginny, was returned to Banda, having found the Iland: but in sending their men on shore to intreate of Trade, there nine of them killed by the Heathens, which are man-eaters; So they were constrained to returne, finding no good to be done there [...].

Carstenszoon's 1623 account further adds that the Aboriginal people seemed acquainted with muskets, presuming they had felt their fatal effects earlier in 1606. It seems clear that Duyfken's crew engaged in conflict with Aboriginal people, making the first European landfall a violent one. However, the specific details and timings of the other eight deaths are not clear, having possibly occurred earlier in New Guinea and Australia. Historian Miriam Estensen reconstructs the events to suggest that the other eight deaths occurred first at Yos Sudarso Island in New Guinea, and that by the time of this final conflict at Ducie River approximately half the crew remained, precipitating the decision to return. However, more recent interpretations by the Dutch Australian Cultural Centre that draw on both the Dutch archived material and stories from Aboriginal elders, suggest that prior conflict at Cape Keerweer lead to three crew deaths, substantiating the reason to turn back at this location. The remaining five deaths are thought to have occurred on the return leg as part of a landing at Yos Sudarso Island in New Guinea, where a clash over water and firewood occurred with local people. This is the opposite timeline to that described by Estensen, who places eight crew deaths on the island during the first visit. The situation is further obscured by Australian Aboriginal oral traditions, with some accounting for all nine deaths at Cape Keerweer.

Having lost men through open hostility and absent of rewards or even evidence for the riches that motivated the journey, Janszoon returned to Banda by June of 1606.

He called the land he had discovered Nieu Zelant, or Nieu Zeelandt, after the Dutch province of Zeeland, but the name was not adopted, and was later used by Dutch cartographers for New Zealand.

In 1607, Admiral Cornelis Matelieff de Jonge sent Janszoon to Ambon and Banda. In 1611, Janszoon returned to the Netherlands, believing that the south coast of New Guinea was joined to the land along which he had sailed, and Dutch maps reproduced that error for many years.

=== Second voyage to Australia ===
Janszoon reported that on 31 July 1618 he had landed on an island at 22° South with a length of 22 miles (Note: Presumably the common Dutch mile preferred by mariners. At the time, each such mile was either 5,660 metres (18,570 ft) or 6,280 metres (20,600 ft); that is, the island was either 125 kilometres (78 mi) or 138 kilometres (86 mi) long.) and 240 miles south-southeast of the Sunda Strait. This is generally interpreted as a description of the peninsula from Point Cloates (22°43′S 113°40′E) to North West Cape (21°47′S 114°09′E) on the Western Australian coast, which Janszoon presumed was an island without fully circumnavigating it.

== Political ==
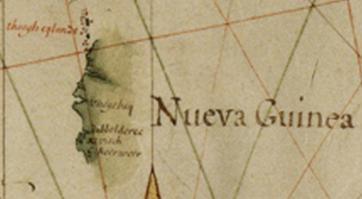
Willem Janszoon’s Vliege Bay, Dubbelde Rev., R. Visch, and Cape Keerweer on the coast of Nueva Guinea on Hessel Gerritszoon’s map of the Pacific Ocean, 1622

Around 1617–1618, he was back in the Netherlands and was appointed as a member of the Council of the Indies. He served as admiral of the Dutch Defence fleet. Janszoon was awarded a gold chain worth 1,000 guilders in 1619, equivalent to €41,756 in 2023, for his part in capturing four ships of the British East India Company near Tiku on West Sumatra, which had aided the Javanese in their defence of the town of Jakarta against the Dutch. In 1620, he was one of the negotiators with the English. In a combined fleet, they sailed to Manila to prevent Chinese merchants dealing with the Spanish. Janszoon became vice-admiral, and the year later admiral. Near the end of his life, Janszoon served as governor of Banda (1623–1627). He is thought to have died in 1630.

== Records ==
The original journal and log made during Janszoon’s 1606 voyage have been lost. The Duyfken chart, which shows the location of the first landfall in Australia by Duyfken, had a better fate. It was still in existence in Amsterdam when Hessel Gerritszoon made his map of the Pacific in 1622, and placed Duyfken geography upon it, thus providing us with the first map to contain any part of Australia. The chart was still in existence around 1670, when a copy was made. This eventually went to the Imperial Library in Vienna and remained forgotten for two hundred years. The map is part of the Atlas Blaeu Van der Hem, brought to Vienna in 1730 by Prince Eugene of Savoy. The information from his charts was included in the marble and copper maps of the hemispheres on the floor of The Citizens' Hall of the Royal Palace in Amsterdam.

== Sources ==
- Dese Pascaerte vertoont de wegh, soo int heen als in het weerom seylen, die gehouden is bij het Jacht het Duijfien in het besoecken van de landen beoosten Banda, tot aen Nova Guinea, Maer Guili-guli op Cenam, ende Caram etc, is na de afteijckeninge van Abraham Francken A°. 1602. den 20 April gedaen, Ende Nieuw Zelandt met de Gounongapi daer beoosten is beseijlt, bij Jasper Janssen de Jonge [This chart shows the routes taken by the pinnace Duyfken on the outward as well as on the return voyage when she visited the countries east of Banda up to New Guinea. But Guli Guli on Ceran and Ceram, etc is after the survey drawn by Abraham Francken anno 1602, done 20 April, and Nieuw Zelant with the Gunung Api east of there has been sailed about by Jasper Janssen de Jonge] (Map). Amsterdam: s.n. 1670. hdl:10462/deriv/200764. OCLC 455936201 – via Österreichische Nationalbibliothek. Bildarchiv.
- Forsyth, J. W. (1967). "Janssen, Willem (fl. 1603 - 1628)". Australian Dictionary of Biography. Vol. 2. National Centre of Biography, Australian National University. ISBN 978-0-522-84459-7. ISSN 1833-7538. OCLC 70677943.
- Heeres, Jan Ernst (1899). The Part Borne by the Dutch in the Discovery of Australia 1606-1765 (in Dutch and English). Leiden, London: Brill Publishers. hdl:2027/njp.32101073851337. LCCN 05012045. OCLC 13214159. OL 52349613M. Wikidata Q133908667.
- Heeres, Jan Ernst (3 January 2006). Choat, Colin (ed.). The Part Borne by the Dutch in the Discovery of Australia 1606-1765. Project Gutenberg Australia. Wikidata Q132175190.
- Jansson, Jan; Jansson, Jan (1630). Indiae Orientalis nova descriptio (Map). c. 1:11,000,000 (in Latin). Amsterdam: Apud Joannem Janssonium – via Trove.
- Estensen, Miriam (1998). Discovery: The Quest for the Great South Land. St Leonards, NSW, Australia: Allen & Unwin. ISBN 1864484977.
- Mutch, Thomas Davies (1942). The First Discovery of Australia; With an Account of the Voyage of the "Duyfken" and the Career of Captain Willem Jansz. Sydney: Thomas Davies Mutch. OCLC 1058014886. Archived from the original on 14 February 2020 – via Project Gutenberg Australia.
- Reynders, Peter (31 July 2005). "Note regarding correct English usage when writing Dutch surnames". Project Gutenberg of Australia.
- Scott, Ernest (16 July 1916). A short History of Australia. Melbourne: Project Gutenberg of Australia.
- Serle, Percival (1949). "JANSZ or JANSSEN, WILLEM (c. 1570-after 1629)". Dictionary of Australian Biography. Project Gutenberg Australia. LCCN 49006289. OCLC 1956219. OL 7423467W. Wikidata Q5273962.
- "South Land to New Holland". South Land to New Holland. 22 September 2006. Archived from the original on 22 September 2006 – via National Library of Australia.
- "First contact between the Dutch and the Aboriginal People". Dutch Australian Cultural Centre. 25 February 2023.
- Gerritsen, Rupert; Wensley, Penelope; Ruigrok, Annemieke; Guivarra, Peter; Sheehan, Colin; McHugh, Evan; Karntin, Jack Spear; Cocks, Graeme; Wharton, Geoff (2015). Gerritsen, Rupert (ed.). The Duyken: unveiling the first contact memorial (2nd ed.). Australia on the Map (Australasian Hydrographic Society); Western Australian Museum; Netherlands Embassy (Australia). ISBN 978-1-925040-13-5. OCLC 899445666.
