= Duyfken =

Dutch ship

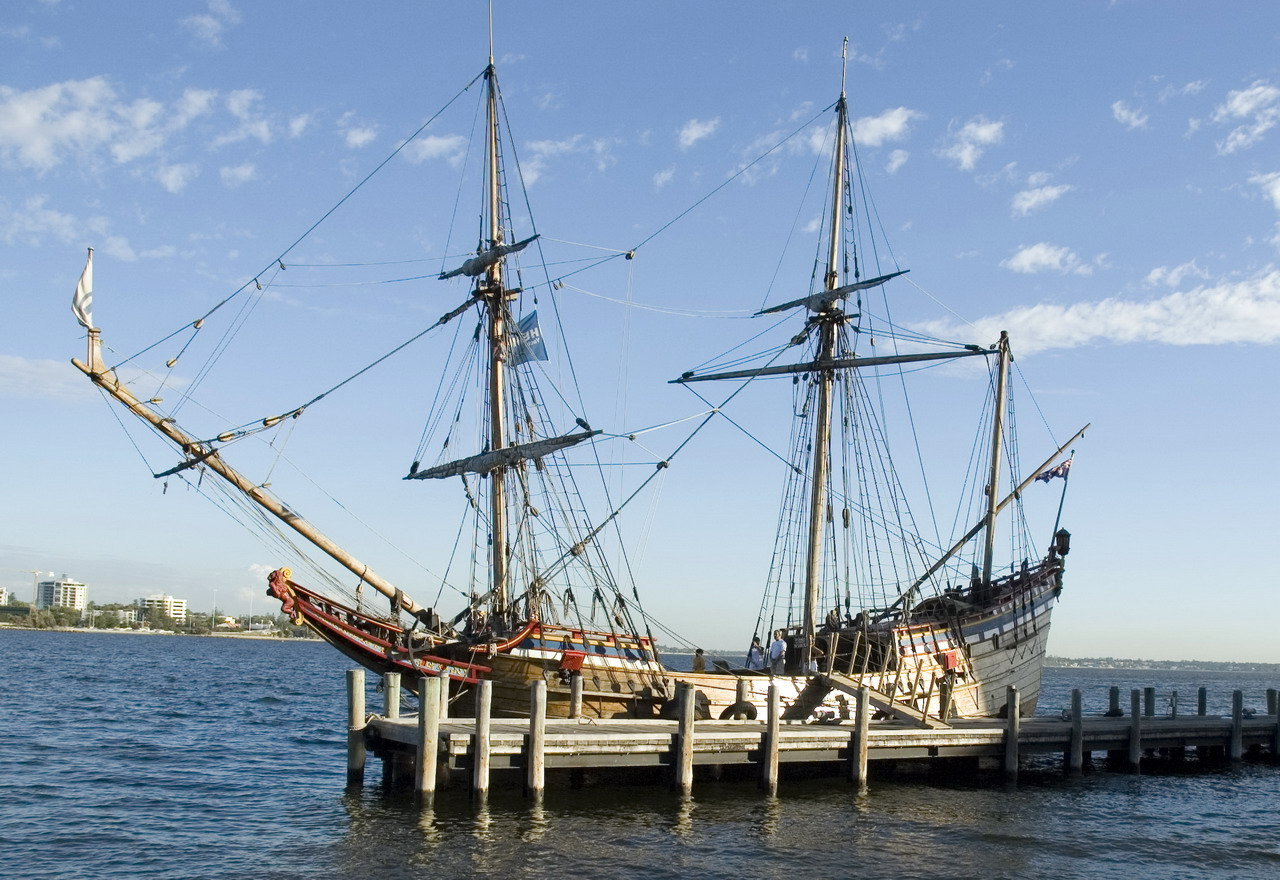
- The 1999 replica of Duyfken in 2006

History

Dutch Republic
- Name: Duyfken
- Launched: 1601
- Fate: Condemned beyond repair July 1608 at Ternate

General characteristics
- Length: 19.6 m (64 ft) (estimated)
- Beam: 5.45 m (17.9 ft) (estimated)
- Depth of hold: 1.85 m (6.1 ft) (estimated)
- Propulsion: Sail
- Speed: 7 knots (13 km/h; 8.1 mph)
- Armament: 8 cannons

Duyfken (Dutch pronunciation: [ˈdœyfkə(n)]; lit. 'Little Dove'), also in the form Duifje or spelled Duifken or Duijfken, was a small ship built in the Dutch Republic. She was a fast, lightly armed ship probably intended for shallow water, small valuable cargoes, bringing messages, sending provisions, or privateering. The tonnage of Duyfken has been given as 25–30 lasten.

In 1606, during a voyage of discovery from Bantam (Banten), Java, captained by Willem Janszoon, she encountered the Australian mainland. Janszoon is credited with the first authenticated European landing on Australia. In 1608, the ship was damaged beyond repair.

A reproduction of Duyfken was built in Australia and launched in 1999.

== Probable hull shape and size ==
The building of the 1999 replica meant that the likely characteristics of Duyfken were the subject of intensive study. There was a limited amount of information to go on; shipyards of this time did not use written plans or half-models. There is only one picture that can be identified as Duyfken (drawn in the logbook of the VOC flagship Gelderlandt in Autumn 1601). Maritime artists of the time did not necessarily portray ships with full accuracy, but the iconographic material was used as a source. One wreck of a Dutch ship of c. 1590 provided information on hull lines.

The hull size for Duyfken was given as both 25 and 30 lasten in different contemporary documents. Nick Burningham, the archaeologist working on the design of the replica, suggests that at this time the tonnage may have been estimated to the nearest 5 lasten, rather than based on actual measurements. (Note: Applying the dimensions of the replica to the formula for Builder's Old Measurement gives a figure of about 40 tons as an indication of hull volume in a nearly contemporary tonnage system. The same calculation for the estimated dimensions of the original ship gives 35 tons.)

The conclusion was that the original Duyfken had a hull that would give fast performance and good windward ability for her time. This is based on the likelihood that there were hollow waterlines at the bow, which was relatively sharp, and the hull had significant deadrise. The tumblehome continued straight up to the rail at deck level. Generally, these characteristics were not as expected when the research started, giving a hull shape different from a Dutch ship built 50 years later.

== Voyages ==
In 1595, a ship named Duyfken sailed in the first expedition to Bantam. After returning in August 1597, this ship was renamed Overijsel and also sailed in the second and fourth expeditions to the East Indies.

On 23 April 1601, another ship named Duyfken sailed from Texel as jacht, or scout, under skipper Willem Cornelisz Schouten to the Spice Islands. After reaching Bantam, the "Moluccan Fleet", consisting of five ships including Duyfken under admiral Wolphert Harmensz, encountered a blockading fleet of Portuguese ships totalling eight galleons and twenty-two galleys. They engaged this fleet in intermittent battle (the Battle of Bantam), driving them away on New Year's Day 1602. Thus, the undisputed dominance of the Iberians (Portuguese and Spanish) in the spice trade to Europe was ended.

The fleet received a warm welcome in Bantam, repairs were carried out to damage caused in the battle, and a survey of Jakarta Bay was undertaken, where the Dutch would later build Batavia, their capital in the Indies. Then, sailing by way of Tuban, East Java to the Spice Island of Ternate, cloves were loaded on board and the ship returned to Banda for a cargo of nutmeg.

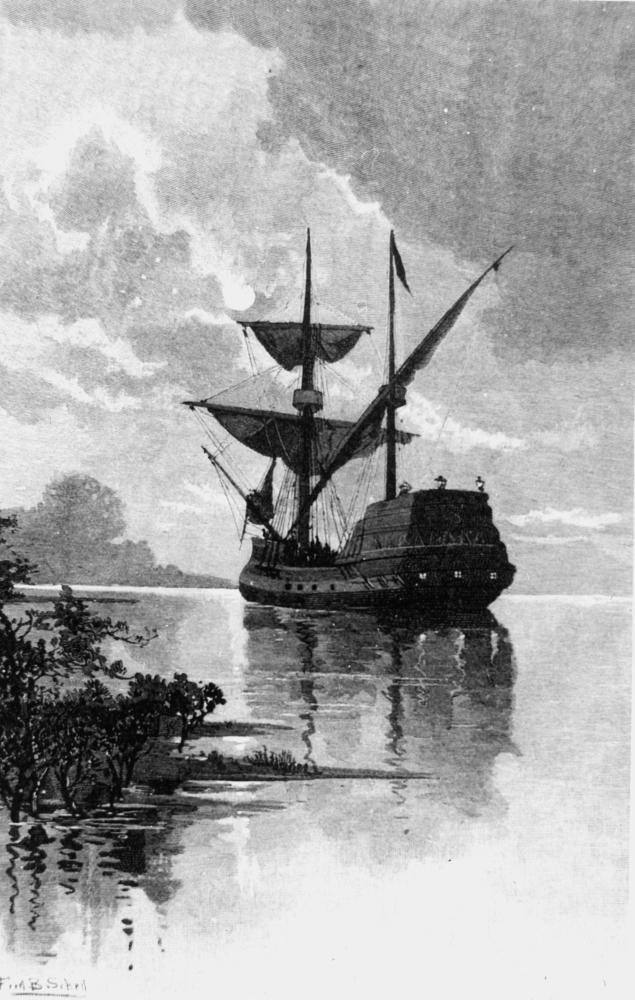
An 1886 illustration depicting how the artist imagined Duyfken in the Gulf of Carpentaria

Duyfken was then sent on a voyage of exploration to the east when the newly formed Dutch East India Company (Dutch: Vereenigde Oostindische Compagnie, commonly abbreviated to VOC) was granted a monopoly on trade to the Spice Islands by the Dutch government. On the voyage home from the Indies Duyfken was separated from the larger ships in a storm off Cape Agulhas, southern Africa and reached Flushing in April 1603, two months ahead of the larger ships.

On 18 December 1603, Duyfken, with Willem Janszoon as skipper, set out on a second voyage to the Indies in the VOC fleet of Steven van der Haghen. The VOC fleet captured a Portuguese ship in Mozambique Channel and sailed to the Spice Islands via Goa, Calicut, Pegu and finally reaching Bantam, Java on New Year's Eve 1604.

In 1605, Duyfken was in the fleet that recaptured the fort of Van Verre at Ambon in the Spice Islands, from the Portuguese. She was then sent to Bantam, Java for urgently needed provisions.

In 1605, the Dutch East India Company (VOC) sent Duyfken, captained by Willem Janszoon, to search for trade opportunities in the "south and east lands" beyond the furthest reaches of their known world. Willem Janszoon took the ship southeast from Banda to the Kei Islands, then along the south coast of New Guinea, skirting south of the shallow waters around False Cape (Irian Jaya) and then continuing east-southeast.

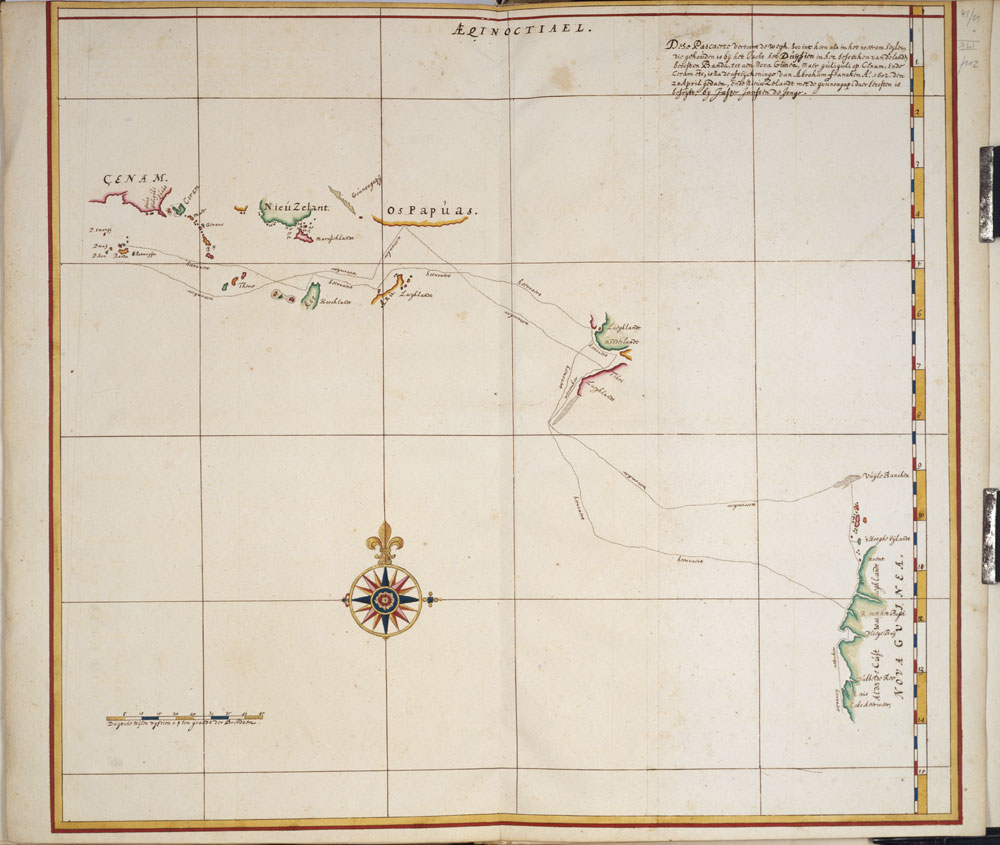
A 1670 copy of a map drawn on board Duyfken during her voyage of discovery along the Australian coast in 1606 from the Atlas Van der Hem

In early 1606, Janszoon encountered and then charted the shores of Australia's Cape York Peninsula. The ship made landfall at the Pennefather River in the Gulf of Carpentaria. This is the first authenticated sighting of Australia by Europeans, and also the first authenticated landing of Europeans on Australian soil. For the first time all the inhabited continents of the world were known to the European science of geography. The ship sailed back to Banda.

In 1607, Duyfken may have made a second voyage east to Australia. Later in the year, she was sent to Java to get supplies for the beleaguered Dutch fortress on Ternate. In February or March 1608, Duyfken was involved in hunting Chinese junks north of Ternate.

In May 1608, the ship was engaged in a five-hour battle with three Portuguese galleys. In June, she was sent with larger ships to capture the fortress of Taffaso on Makian Island. A month later, she was brought inside the reef at Ternate for repairs. It seems that she was hauled on her side to repair the bottom but this caused further damage, and the ship was condemned as beyond repair.

== Replica ==
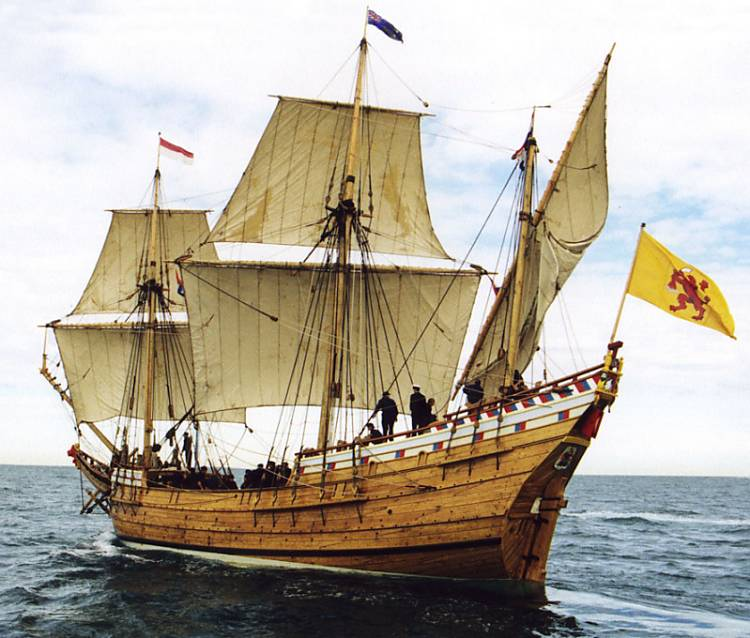
The 1999 replica of Duyfken under sail around 2006

The Duyfken Replica Project was founded by the Dutch-born Australian historian Michael John Young. Young became aware of Duyfken as early as 1976 and lobbied extensively for a new replica project after the launch of the Endeavour replica in Fremantle, Australia in the mid-1990s.

The Duyfken Replica committee was established in 1995 by Michael Young and retired journalist James Henderson. This led to the establishment of the Friends of the Duyfken group then ultimately, the Duyfken 1606 Replica Foundation. The Foundation was initially chaired by entrepreneur Michael G. Kailis of Perth, who led the charge in raising the A$3.5 million building budget.

On 27 March 1997, Dutch Crown Prince William-Alexander laid the Duyfken replica's keel at the Duyfken Replica Ship Yard in front of the Fremantle Maritime Museum in Fremantle, Western Australia.

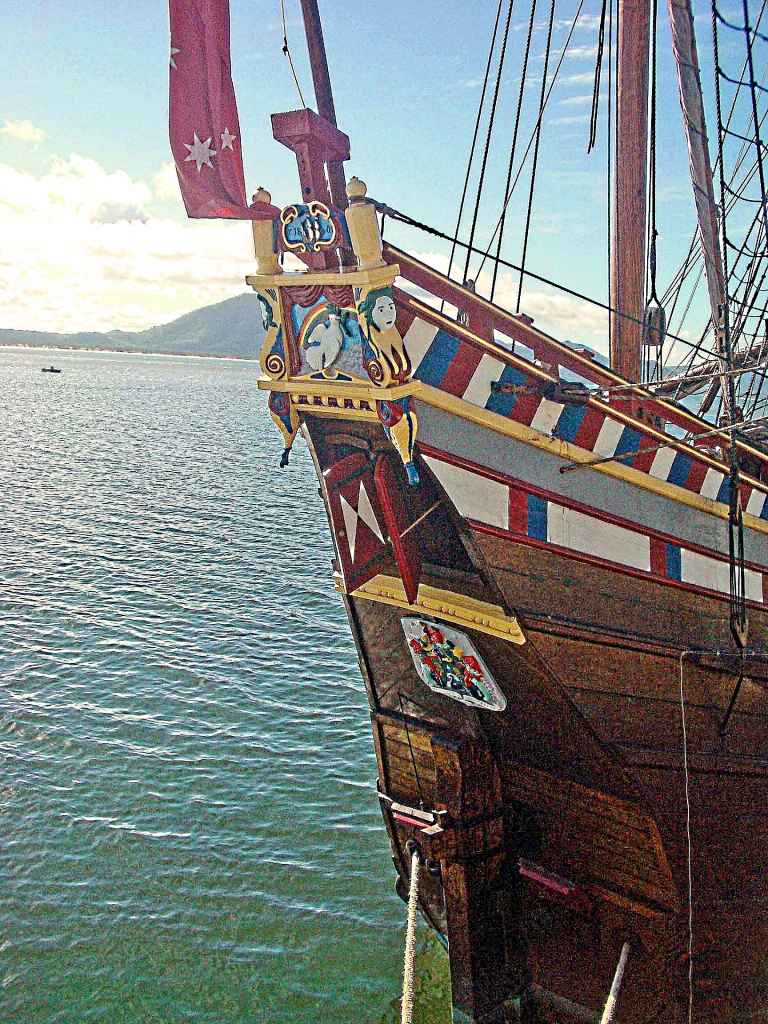
Decorated stern of Duyfken replica in Cooktown harbour in 2009

A full size reproduction of Duyfken was built by the "Duyfken 1606 Replica Foundation" jointly with the Maritime Museum of Western Australia and launched on 24 January 1999 in Fremantle. She then undertook an expedition to Banda in Indonesia and sailed on a reenactment voyage to the Pennefather River in Queensland. Then to mark the 400th anniversary of the United Dutch East India Company (VOC) the ship sailed from Sydney, to Queensland, Indonesia, Sri Lanka, Mauritius, South Africa, Namibia, and finally Texel in the Netherlands. The ship then conducted a six month exhibition tour of The Netherlands. While in the Netherlands, the floor of the hold was replaced by antique Dutch bricks.

The story of the construction of the replica and the ship's major voyages is published in a book, Through Darkest Seas, by the former Project Director and Chair of the Duyfken 1606 Replica Foundation, Graeme Cocks.

For a period in 2005, Duyfken was berthed alongside the Old Swan Brewery on the Swan River in Perth, Western Australia. The replica was open for visits by the public.

In 2006, Western Australia played a big role in the 400th anniversary of the original Duyfken's visit to Australia. A national group called "Australia on the Map: 1606–2006" (Note: Now "Australia on the Map", a division of the Australasian Hydrographic Society.) was formed to commemorate the arrival of Duyfken and to mark this important milestone in Australia's history, by also giving recognition to all who followed her and contributed to the mapping of the Australian coast.

Duyfken was berthed at the Queensland Maritime Museum in Southbank, Brisbane, Queensland until early 2011, when she was then placed on display at the Australian National Maritime Museum in Sydney. In 2012 she returned to Fremantle.

In November 2020, the Foundation announced that Duyfken would return to the Australian National Maritime Museum. COVID-19 pandemic travel restrictions prevented the crew from travelling from New South Wales to Fremantle to sail the ship, so it was transported on a larger vessel to Newcastle, then sailed from there to Sydney, arriving on 22 December 2020. As of 2024, the replica Duyfken continues to be situated in Darling Harbour, Sydney.
