= Pennefather River =

River in Queensland, Australia

Pennefather
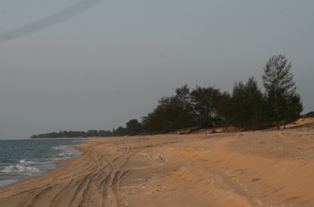
- Near Pennefather River mouth, in southwest Cape York Peninsula

- Location of Pennefather River mouth in Queensland
- Etymology: In honour of Charles de Fonblanque Pennefather

Location
- Country: Australia
- State: Queensland
- Region: Far North Queensland

Physical characteristics
- Source
  - location: Mapoon
  - coordinates: 12.33147°S 141.87289°E
  - elevation: 20 m (66 ft)
- Source confluence: Fish Creek and a series of unnamed waterways
  - location: Port Musgrave Aggregation wetlands
  - coordinates: 12°15′17″S 141°48′19″E
  - elevation: 1 m (3 ft 3 in)
- Mouth: Gulf of Carpentaria
  - location: south of Mapoon
  - coordinates: 12°13′44″S 141°43′14″E
  - elevation: 0 m (0 ft)
- Length: 11 km (6.8 mi)
- Basin size: 3,009 km^{2} (1,162 sq mi)

The Pennefather River is a river on the western Cape York Peninsula in Far North Queensland, Australia.

== Location and features ==
Formed by the confluence of a series of waterways including the Fish Creek in the Port Musgrave Aggregation estuarine wetlands, the Pennefather River flows due west, joined by the Turtle Creek from the north and Dingo Creek from the south, before emptying into the Gulf of Carpentaria south of Mapoon. The river descends 1 metre (3 ft 3 in) over its 11-kilometre (6.8 mi) course. At its widest point, the river is approximately 2 kilometres (1.2 mi) wide. The river has a catchment area of 3,009 square kilometres (1,162 sq mi), of which 349 square kilometres (135 sq mi) comprises wetlands.

== Etymology and history ==
Yupanguthi (Yuputhimri, Jupangati, Yupangathi, Nggerikudi, Yupungati, Jupangati) is an Australian Aboriginal language spoken on Yupanguthi country. The Yupanguthi language region includes the landscape within the local government boundaries of the landscape within the local government boundaries of the Shire of Cook.

The river mouth was a site of the first recorded landfall in Australia by a Dutch explorer, by Willem Janszoon in 1606. Janszoon named it R. met het Bosch ("River with the Forest").

In 1802 the British explorer Matthew Flinders mistook the river for the Coen River, which had been named by Dutch explorer Jan Carstensz in 1623 (now the Archer River), so that the Bosch / Pennefather River was named Coen River on maps in the 19th century. In 1880, Captain Charles Edward de Fonblanque Pennefather established that there were now two Coen Rivers, (Note: The name Coen River eventually was only retained by a southern tributary of the original Coen River.) and in 1894 Queensland authorities named the river after him, although the British Admiralty Chart for the Gulf of Carpentaria kept the name Coen River until 1967.

== See also ==
- List of rivers of Australia § Queensland
