= John Brooks =

John Brooks may refer to:

== Association football/soccer ==
- John Brookes (footballer, born 1943) (born 1943), English footballer
- John Brooks (footballer, born 1927) (1927–2018), English footballer
- Johnny Brooks (1931–2016), former English footballer
- John Brooks (footballer, born 1956), retired English soccer forward
- John Brooks (soccer, born 1993), German-American soccer player
- John Brooks (referee) (born 1990), English association football referee

== Other sportspeople ==
- John Brooks (racing driver) (born 1959), American race car driver
- John Brooks (rugby union) (born 1977), Harlequins rugby union player
- John Brooks (athlete) (1910–1990), American long jumper

== Politicians ==
- John Brooks (governor) (1752–1825), 11th Governor of Massachusetts
- John Brooks (mayor) (1785–1869), 9th mayor of Columbus, Ohio
- John Brooks (New York politician) (born 1949), Member of the New York Senate from the 8th District
- John Brooks, Baron Brooks of Tremorfa (1927–2016), Welsh politician and boxing functionary
- John Brooks (English politician) (1856–1886), British Conservative MP
- John C. Brooks (born 1937), North Carolina Labor Commissioner
- J. Stewart Brooks (1910–2000), Canadian politician whose given name was John

== Musicians ==
- John Benson Brooks (1917–1999), American jazz pianist, songwriter, arranger, and composer
- John Ellingham Brooks (1863–1929), English pianist and classical music scholar

== Others ==
- John Brooks (engraver) (fl. 1755), Irish engraver
- John Brooks (writer) (1920–1993), financial journalist for The New Yorker magazine
- John Brooks Jr. (1783–1813), United States Marine Lieutenant, killed at Battle of Lake Erie
- John A. Brooks (1836–1897), religious scholar and prohibitionist
- John E. Brooks (1923–2012), former President of College of the Holy Cross
- John J. Brooks, American lawman
- John Graham Brooks (1846–1938), American sociologist, political reformer, and author
- John Langdon Brooks (1920–2000), American evolutionary biologist, ecologist and limnologist
- Ferdinand Poulton (c. 1601–1641), Jesuit missionary who used the alias John Brooks for most of his life

== See also ==
- John Brooks House, historic house in Worcester, Massachusetts
- Jon Brooks (disambiguation)
- Jack Brooks (disambiguation)
- John Brooks Wheelwright (1897–1940), American poet
- John Brooks Close (1850–1914), English banker and amateur rower
- John Brooke (disambiguation)
- John Brookes (disambiguation)
- Brooks (surname)
