= Trial (ship) =

Ships named Trial or variants of it

Several vessels have been named Trial, or a now obsolete variant of that word:

- Tryall was an East Indiaman of the English East India Company. She was launched in 1621. She was under the command of John Brooke when she was wrecked on the Tryal Rocks off the north-west coast of Western Australia in 1622. Her crew were the first Englishmen to sight or land on Australia. The wreck is Australia's oldest known shipwreck.
- Tryall (1649) was the first vessel built in Connecticut Colony.
- Trial (1780 ship) was launched at Calcutta as a packet for the British East India Company. She made two voyages to England. In 1782 she narrowly escaped being seized by mutineers. After her return to Calcutta in 1786 she became a pilot schooner for the Bengal Pilot Service. A French privateer captured her in 1797.
- Trial (1803 ship) was launched at Belfast in 1803. Apparently for most of her career she was initially an Irish coaster. A French privateer captured and burnt her in 1810 while she was returning to Ireland from Gibraltar.
- Trial (1808 ship) was a ship that first appears in 1808 and that was seized by convicts and eventually wrecked on the Mid North Coast of New South Wales, Australia in 1816.

== See also ==
- HMS Trial, any one of eight ships of the English, British, or United Kingdom navies.
