= Cape Route =

Shipping route around the Cape of Good Hope

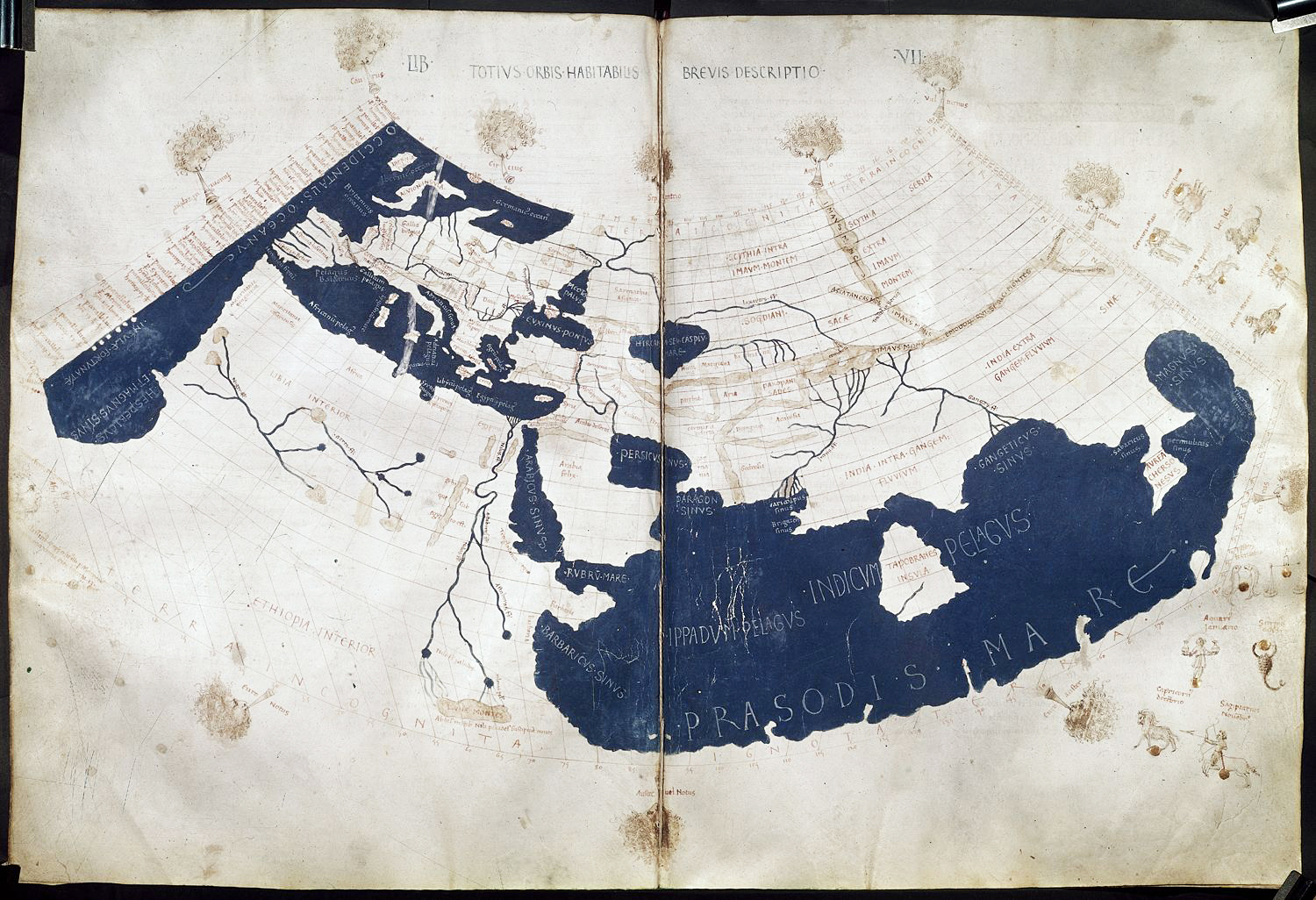
Ptolemy's world map implied that Africa was part of an outer landmass, separating the Atlantic from the Indian Ocean.

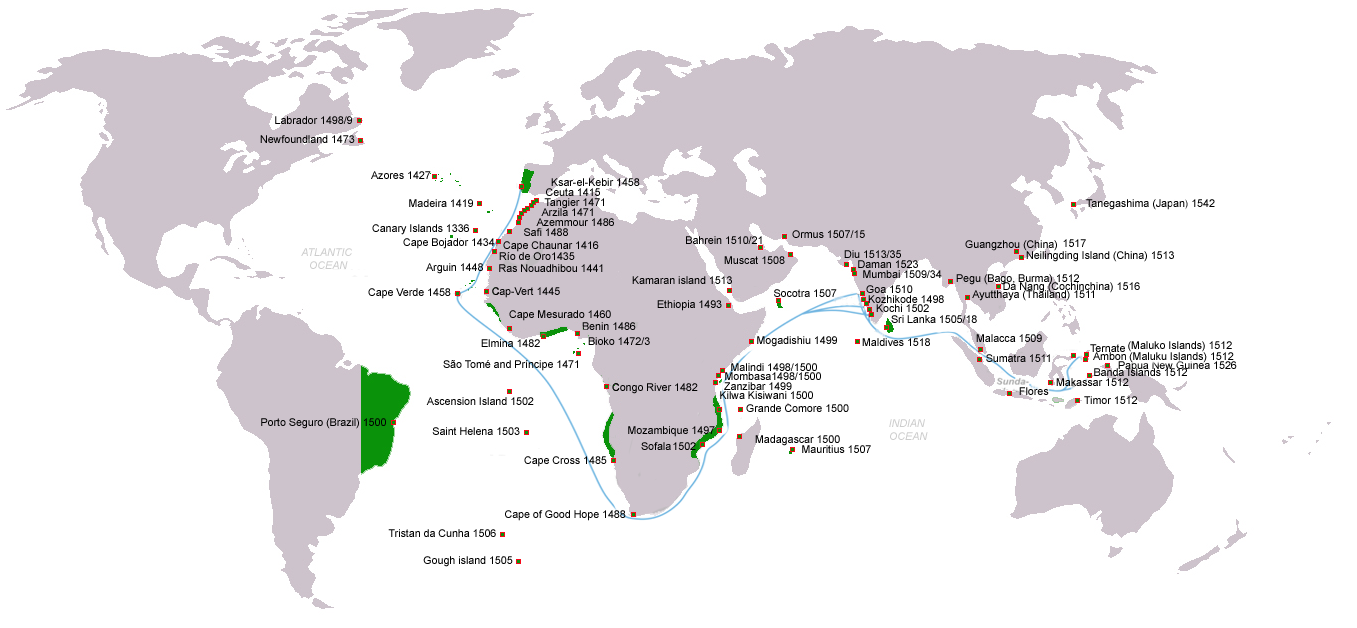
The early Portuguese Empire centered around the Cape Route.

In 1500, Portuguese explorer Pedro Álvares Cabral used the prevailing winds on the Atlantic for a volta do mar, and thereby became the first European to arrive in Brazil. European sailors found the stop useful on the way to India.

Since the Suez Canal opened, the Cape Route has been used when passage through Suez is refused, or by Capesize ships. In the 1904-05 Russo-Japanese War, the Dogger Bank incident forced the Russian fleet to sail around Africa.

The European-Asian sea route, commonly known as the sea route to India or the Cape Route, is a shipping route from the European coast of the Atlantic Ocean to Asia's coast of the Indian Ocean passing by the Cape of Good Hope and Cape Agulhas at the southern edge of Africa. The first recorded completion of the route was made in 1498 by Portuguese explorer Vasco da Gama, the admiral of the first Portuguese Armadas bound eastwards to make the discovery. The route was important during the Age of Sail, but became partly obsolete as the Suez Canal opened in 1869.

== History ==
Scholars of classical antiquity disagreed whether the Atlantic was connected to the Indian Ocean. There are anecdotes about circumnavigation of Africa in ancient times; according to Herodotus, a Phoenician expedition commissioned by Egyptian king Necho II completed a voyage from the Red Sea to the Nile delta around 600 BC. Eudoxus of Cyzicus attempted to circumnavigate Africa at some point around 100 BC, but never returned, having likely died during the attempt. Ptolemy's world map, on which the geographic knowledge of medieval Europe was founded, displays the oceans as separated from each other, with Ptolemy conjecturing on the existence of a land bridge between Africa and India.

=== Discovery ===
In the late Middle Ages, the spice trade from India and the Silk Road from China were of economic importance, but the 1453 fall of Constantinople disrupted trade, and gave the Europeans incentives to find a sea route. Portuguese explorer Diogo Cão explored the African coast south to present-day Namibia, and Bartolomeu Dias found the Cape of Good Hope in 1488. Vasco da Gama headed an expedition which led to the Portuguese discovery of the sea route to India in 1498, and a series of expeditions known as the Carreira da Índia. Since then, the Cape Route has been in use.

Christopher Columbus sought to find a westward sea route to the Indian subcontinent, but instead found the way to the Americas. These expeditions marked the beginning of the Age of Discovery, in which European explorers charted the world's oceans.

=== Use during Age of Sail ===
The Cape Route was used by European East India Companies. In the 17th century, during the beginnings of colonialism, Caribbean pirates followed the Pirate Round; a parallel route from the Caribbean across the south Atlantic, to the Indian Ocean.

The European colonization of Africa was before the late 19th century mostly limited to a few coastal outposts, to support the Cape Route. The Dutch East India Company founded the Dutch Cape Colony as a layover port on the way to the Dutch East Indies in Southeast Asia.

The Brouwer Route was an extension of the Cape Route across the Indian Ocean to Indonesia. The Clipper Route is a route along the Roaring Forties between Europe and the island of Australia.

=== Suez Canal ===
The Suez Canal opened in November 1869, allowing a shortcut between the Atlantic and the Indian Ocean. Because of the prevailing winds at Suez, the canal is less suitable for sailing boats, so steamships got a competitive advantage when the canal opened. While the Cape Route remained useful for clippers for some decades, the opening of the canal was the beginning of the end of the Cape Route, as well as the Age of Sail as a whole. Nowadays, the route around the Cape remains popular in yacht racing.

The maximum ship size for the Suez Canal are referred to as Suezmax. Capesize ships are those too large for the Suez Canal, which need to use the Cape Route between the Atlantic and the Indian Ocean. The 2015 inauguration of the New Suez Canal raised the Suezmax dimensions, and allowed larger ships. Thereby, the Cape Route became even less important, although it still is an alternative secondary route if the Suez Canal is somehow disrupted (for example, during the 2021 Suez Canal obstruction), or to avoid paying fees for crossing the canal if it is economically advantageous to do so. The journey can take up to two weeks longer for modern ships than a direct route via the Suez.

== See also ==
- East India Company (disambiguation)
- Winds in the Age of Sail – Air currents in early modern navigation
- Indian Ocean trade – Trade conducted through the Indian Ocean
