= John Brookes =

John Brookes may refer to:

- John Brookes (East India Company), 17th century commander of first British vessel to come within sight of the Australian continent
- Sir John Brookes, 1st Baronet (died 1691), English MP
- John Henry Brookes (1891–1975), last principal of Oxford City Technical School
- John Brookes (footballer, born 1927) (1927–2018), English football midfielder
- John Brookes (footballer, born 1943) (born 1943), English football forward
- John Brookes (landscape designer) (1933–2018), British garden and landscape designer

== See also ==
- John Brooks (disambiguation)
- John Brooke (disambiguation)
- Jon Brooks (disambiguation)
