= Winds in the Age of Sail =

Air currents in early modern navigation

The captain of a steam ship naturally chooses the shortest route to nearby destinations. Since a sailing ship is usually pushed by winds and currents, its captain must find a route where the wind will probably blow in the right direction. Tacking, i.e. using contrary wind to pull (sic) the sails, was always possible but wasted time because of the zigzagging required, and significantly delayed long voyages. The early European explorers were not only looking for new lands. They also had to discover the pattern of winds and currents that would carry them where they wanted to go. During the Age of Sail, winds and currents determined trade routes and therefore influenced European imperialism and modern political geography. For an outline to the main wind systems see Global wind patterns.

Pilotage or cabotage, in one sense, is the art of sailing along the coast using known landmarks. Navigation, in one sense, is the art of sailing long distances out of sight of land. Although the Polynesians were able to sail the Pacific and people regularly sailed north and south across the Mediterranean, before the time of Columbus nearly all sailing was coastal pilotage.

== Asia ==
In East Asia: Sailing east from China, Korea, or Japan, sailors find only thousands of miles of empty ocean and a few tiny islands. The Kuroshio Current tends to push ships northeast into the westerlies and towards North America. There are records of unlucky Japanese fishermen being blown to North America, but no records of any who sailed home. It is easy to sail south and link up with the Indian Ocean trade. North China had few ports and little coastwise trade. South China has a number of good ports, but the country inland is hilly or mountainous, which restricts trade.

Indian Ocean and the Monsoon Trade: There are no barriers to trade along the coast between the Red Sea and Japan. Local coastal routes soon were linked and extended to Indonesia. By about 850 trade was mostly in Muslim hands. This trade brought Hinduism and later Islam to Indonesia. A great advantage in the Indian Ocean is the monsoon which blows south in the winter and north in the summer. Someone in the Arabian Peninsula wishing to go to Africa or Indonesia would go south on the winter monsoon and return north with the summer monsoon. In Africa this trade extended about as far as Mozambique, at the southern limit of monsoon winds. Further south was a lee shore with no trade goods that could not be obtained further north. It is not clear how far south trade and geographic knowledge extended, but there is said to be a Chinese map of the thirteenth century showing Africa in roughly its true shape and there is a Venetian report from the mid-fifteenth century of a Chinese or Javanese junk seen off the southwest African coast.

== Eastbound from Europe ==
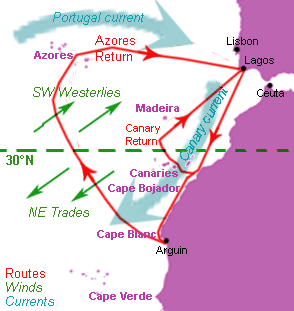
"Volta do mar" manoeuvre during Henry the Navigator's (c.1430-1460) lifetime: Atlantic winds (green), currents (blue) and approximate Portuguese sailing routes (red): the further south ships went, the wider off sailing required to return. Note that the boundary between the westerlies and the trade winds moves north in summer and south in winter.

Portuguese route to India, outbound in red, return route in blue.

Northwest Africa: Those sailing from Europe leave the Strait of Gibraltar and soon hit the Canary Current, which pushes them southwest down the African coast. They soon reach the northeast trade winds, which also push them southwest. If they leave in late summer they will hit the trade winds sooner, since wind systems move north and south with the seasons. The problem was to get back again. The solution was the volta do mar, in which captains would sail northwest across the winds and currents until they found the westerlies and were blown back to Europe.

The coast of Northwest Africa might be described as the nursery of European imperialism. Experience gained here was the basis for the sudden breakout into all the world's oceans in the 30-year period of 1492-1522. The Canary Islands were known to the ancients. They were reached by Lancelotto Malocello in 1312. Jean de Béthencourt conquered two of them in 1405, but the larger islands were not fully subdued until about 1495. The local Guanches have the distinction of being the first non-European people to be wiped out by European expansion. The volta do mar led to the discovery of uninhabited Madeira in 1419 which soon developed a trade in wine and sugar. A longer volta do mar led to the uninhabited Azores which are over 1,100 kilometres (700 mi) from the nearest land. Further south the Cape Verde Islands developed a system of slave-worked sugar plantations which was later exported to Brazil. The Canaries were taken by Spain, and the other islands fell to Portugal. Northwest Africa was the starting point for longer voyages, the Spanish heading southwest from the Canaries and the Portuguese south from Cape Verde.

Down the coast of Africa: The Portuguese reached the westernmost point of Africa in 1444 and in 1458 rounded Cape Palmas, where the coast tends eastward. Here the trade winds gave out, and they faced the irregular winds near the doldrums and the east-flowing Guinea Current. In 1471 they reached the Gold Coast, where they found the gold that had previously come by caravan across the Sahara. In 1474 Lopes Gonçalves reached the point where the coast turns south, and became the first European sailor to cross the equator. Between 1475 and 1479 Spain and Portugal fought along the coast. The Treaty of Alcáçovas gave the whole area to the Portuguese, except for the Canaries. This was the first colonial war and the first colonial treaty. In 1482 Diogo Cão continued south against the Benguela Current and the southeast trade winds, reaching the Congo River in 1482 and Cape Cross in Namibia in 1485. In 1487 Bartolomeu Dias reached Cape Voltas near the mouth of the Orange River and stood out to sea. Although the sources are not clear, he may have guessed that there were southern westerlies and was trying a volta do mar. After many days, at about 40 degrees south he discovered the westerlies and turned east. Finding no land after a number of days, he turned north and reached Mossel Bay about 400 km east of Cape Town. He continued east against the Agulhas Current to Algoa Bay, where the coast began to turn north. Guessing that he had found the route to India, he turned back, discovered and rounded the Cape of Good Hope, and reached Lisbon in 1488. In 1493 Columbus arrived at Lisbon with news of the new world, and reported that he had sailed out of sight of land for five weeks.

In 1497 Vasco da Gama chose a very obvious and very bold route. After rounding the bulge of Africa, he sailed directly south across the trade winds and, helped by the Brazil Current, reached the roaring forties. This was by far the longest voyage yet made out of sight of land. Turning east too soon, he hit the coast and had to work his way around South Africa. Working up the coast against the Agulhas Current, at Mozambique he came in contact with the Arab monsoon trade. At Malindi he found a local pilot and used the summer monsoon to reach India in 23 days. Returning, he foolishly sailed against the summer monsoon and took 132 days to reach Africa. Rounding the Cape of Good Hope, he again chose a wise and bold course. He took the southeast trade winds directly northwest across the South Atlantic to the Cape Verde Islands, the Azores, and home. Not only did Da Gama find a sea route to India, he discovered the most efficient sailing route there and back. In 1500 Pedro Álvares Cabral sailed somewhat west of Da Gama's route and bumped onto the coast of Brazil.

Portuguese and Dutch in the Indian Ocean: After a few more voyages the Portuguese learned two things: that there was little market for European goods in the east, and the large Portuguese ships could outfight nearly any local craft. They therefore determined to take by force what they could not get by honest trade. Under the leadership of Afonso de Albuquerque they captured Goa in 1510 for their main base, captured Malacca in 1511 to control the Strait of Malacca, tried to block the mouths of the Red Sea and the Persian Gulf, and built forts in Mozambique to pick up fresh water and wait for the summer monsoon. In 1513 they reached the Spice Islands and in 1519 reached Canton. They continued to use the monsoon route — north with the summer monsoon and south with the winter monsoon.

The Dutch republic began its remarkable rise about 1580 during its war of independence from Spain. With the union of the two crowns in 1580 it was also at war with Portugal. In 1595 Jan Huyghen van Linschoten published previously-secret Portuguese sailing directions for the Indian Ocean. The Dutch reached Java in 1596 and the Spice Islands in 1599. In 1611 Hendrik Brouwer found a better route to the East Indies. After reaching the roaring forties he continued east almost to Australia and then swung north. This avoided Portuguese warships, and greatly reduced the travel time since there was no need to wait for the monsoon. This Brouwer Route shifted the gateway to the Indies from the Strait of Malacca between Malaya and Sumatra to the Sunda Strait between Sumatra and Java, and led to the foundation of Batavia in 1619. Dutch trade led to the temporary occupation of Dutch Brazil, and to the foundation of Cape Town in 1652 as a way station on the Brouwer Route.

== Westward from Europe ==
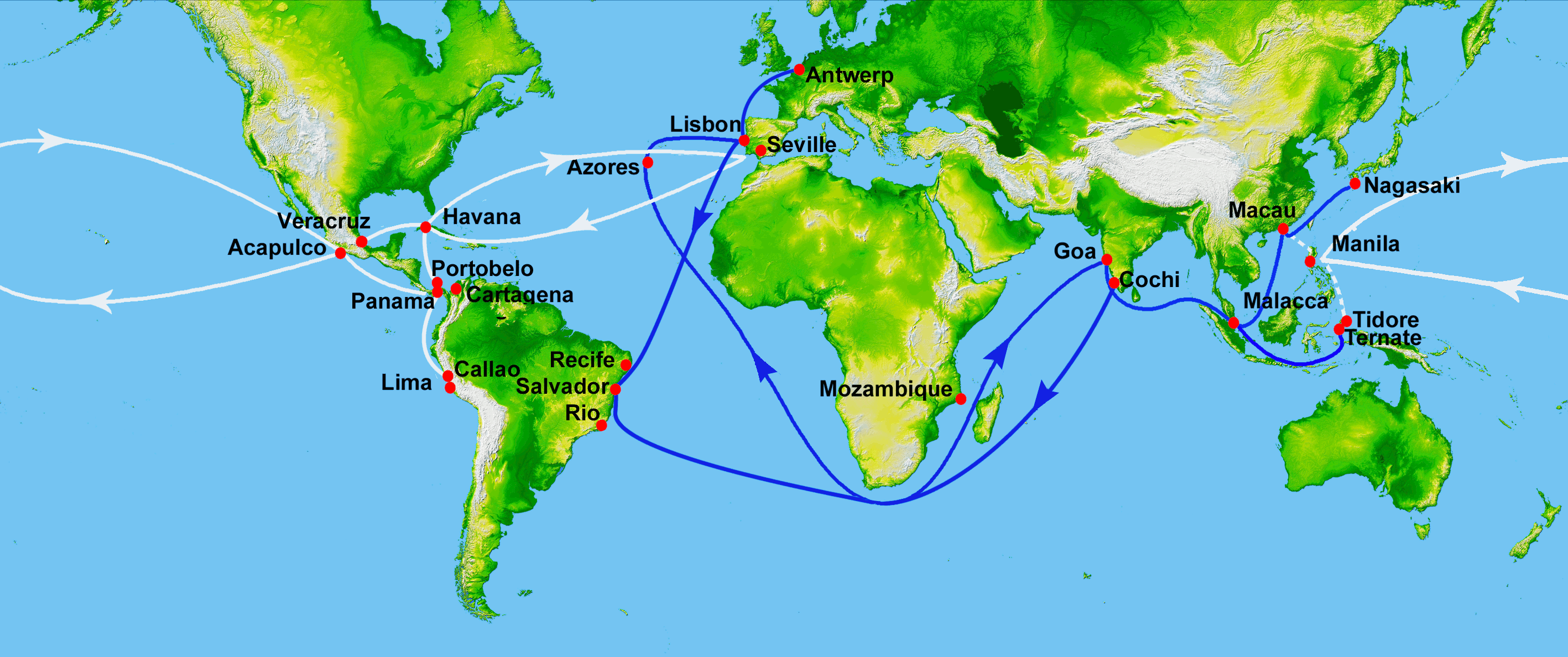
Spanish trans-Atlantic route (white), begun 1492. Manila galleon (Pacific), 1565. (Blue: Portuguese routes, begun 1498-1640).

North Atlantic: Anyone sailing west from Europe is sailing into the wind. Further north, they are sailing against the Gulf Stream. It is not clear how winds and currents were used in this region.

Caribbean: Columbus underestimated the size of the Earth and thought he could reach China by doing a grand volta do mar, going west on the trade winds and returning home on the westerlies. He had the right route but reached the Caribbean Sea rather than China. In 1513 Juan Ponce de León discovered the Gulf Stream while exploring the east coast of Florida. A few years later his pilot, Anton de Alaminos, used the Gulf Stream to push him north to the westerlies and return to Spain. This established the standard Spanish route to the Americas: south to the Canary Islands, west on the trade winds to the Caribbean, then beat against the wind north of Cuba using the Florida Current to the Gulf Steam, then use it to go north to the westerlies which led directly home. Since wind systems move north in summer and south in winter, there is a question of the best season, which is poorly documented. The Caribbean was the gateway to Spanish America, since it is the closest part of America to Europe as measured in sailing days. Nearby were the riches of Mexico and, by crossing Panama, the riches of Peru.

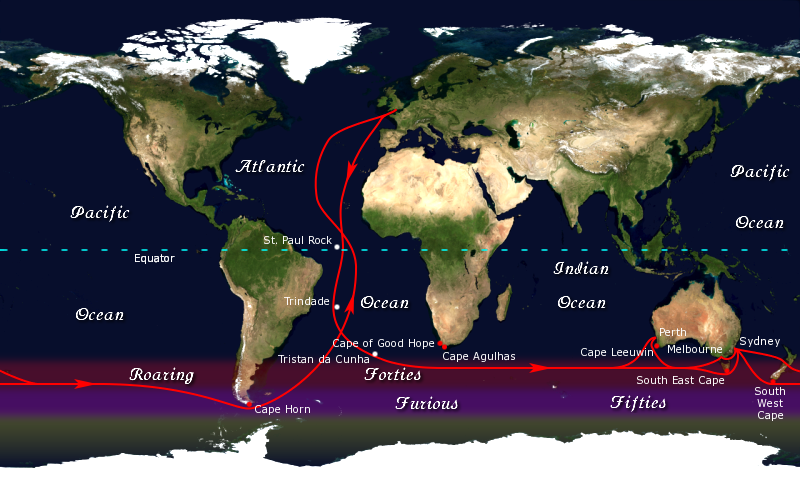
The Clipper Route followed by ships sailing between England and Australia/New Zealand.

Strait of Magellan and the Pacific: Ferdinand Magellan discovered the strait which bears his name in 1519. Entering the Pacific, he used the Humboldt Current to go north to the trade winds, which then blew him westward to the Philippines. One of his surviving ships tried to return east using the northern westerlies but was unable to find them, and was forced to return to the East Indies. In 1565 Andrés de Urdaneta found a wind system that would reliably blow a ship eastward back to the Americas. From then until 1815 the annual Manila Galleons crossed the Pacific from Mexico to the Philippines and back. The Strait of Magellan was rarely used, because it was so far out of the way. The Spanish found it more practical to build ships in the Philippines and on the Pacific coast of the Americas. Silver from Peru was carried north on the Humboldt Current to Panama and carried across the isthmus to join Spanish treasure fleets in the Caribbean. Fernandez-Armesto thinks that southbound ships stood out to sea from Panama to avoid the Humboldt Current, but offers no good evidence.

Cape Horn: In 1616, almost 100 years after Magellan, Willem Schouten went further south and found Cape Horn. This was a better route because it does not require navigating a narrow channel. Only after about 1780 did significant numbers of ships use the Cape Horn route. Cape Horn westbound is difficult because the wind blows from the west and the east-bound Antarctic Circumpolar Current is forced through the gap between Tierra del Fuego and Antarctica. The nineteenth century Clipper Ship Route went from Europe southward to the roaring forties, took them to Australia, and continued east around Cape Horn and returned to England.

== See also ==
- Volta do mar
- Clipper route
- Roaring Forties
- Antarctic Circumpolar Current
- Pre-Columbian trans-oceanic contact theories
- Age of Discovery
