= Tryall =

English trading ship

History

Kingdom of England
- Owner: East India Company
- Maiden voyage: 4 September 1621
- Fate: Wrecked, 25 May 1622

General characteristics
- Tons burthen: 500 bm
- Complement: 143

Tryall (or Trial) was a British East India Company-owned East Indiaman launched in 1621. She was under the command of John Brooke when she was wrecked on the Tryal Rocks off the north-west coast of Western Australia in 1622. Her crew were the first Englishmen to sight or land on Australia. The wreck is Australia's oldest known shipwreck.

== Maiden voyage ==
Tryall departed Plymouth on her maiden voyage for Bantam on 4 September 1621, carrying a cargo that included silver for trade in the East Indies as well as a gift for the King of Siam. She stopped at Cape Town for supplies on 19 March 1622.

The East India Company had only recently issued orders requiring that its ships sail south of 35°S when en route to the East Indies, as this course (the Brouwer Route) made use of the Roaring Forties and could save up to six months' travel time off the more traditional northern route. Neither Brooke nor any of his crew had sailed via the new southern route previously, or even to Batavia, and they asked in Cape Town for experienced sailors willing to join their crew. Attempts to recruit a master's mate from the East Indiaman Charles were unsuccessful.

The vessel departed on 19 March and sighted the Australian coast on 1 May, apparently mistaking Point Cloates approximately 100 kilometres (62 mi) south-south-west of North West Cape on the mainland, for an island that Captain Lenaert Jacobszoon and Supercargo Willem Janszoon in the Dutch East India Company ship Mauritius had encountered in 1618 and which is now known as Barrow Island. This navigation error was caused by having sailed too far east, a common problem of the time before an accurate means of fixing a ship's longitude existed.

== Wreck ==
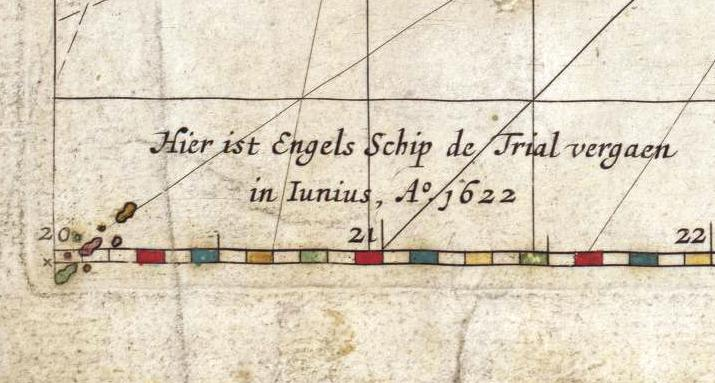
"Here the English ship Trial was wrecked in June 1622"

Turning north, they then encountered several weeks of fresh north to north-westerly winds which impeded progress. Finally, the winds turned to favourable south-westerlies and they started to make good progress to their destination of Batavia. On 25 May 1622 at between 10 and 11 p.m. she struck uncharted submerged rocks about 32 kilometres (20 mi) north-west of the outer edge of the Montebello Islands group, the southern boundary of which is about 8 kilometres (5.0 mi) north of the northern tip of Barrow Island.

The reef was named Tryal Rocks after the ship and is located at 20°16′18″S 115°23′18″E.

Captain Brooke, his son John and nine men scrambled into a skiff and the ship's factor Thomas Bright and 35 others managed to save a longboat. Brooke sailed separately to Java. Bright and his crew spent seven days ashore on the Monte Bello Islands, before sailing the longboat to Bantam in Java. This was the first recorded shipwreck in Australian waters and first extended stay in Australia by Europeans.

In all 44 survivors reached Bantam on 21 June. The skiff arrived at Batavia on 5 July 1622 and the longboat three days later – a voyage of over 1,800 kilometres (1,100 mi). Of the 143 men who had left England, 93 had perished at the wreck site, and one person died in the skiff.

== Investigation ==
On his arrival in Batavia, Brooke wrote to his masters in London blaming Captain Fitzherbert, who had been the first British captain to pioneer the southern route across the Indian Ocean after Dutch captain Hendrik Brouwer. Brooke declared that he had followed the route specified by Fitzherbert and had struck rocks where Fitzherbert had said there were none. He said Fitzherbert's incorrect mapping had been the cause for the disaster and denied any responsibility. Brooke claimed that the reef site was well west of the actual site in an attempt to hide his easterly course. He also claimed that all the cargo, including the silver and the ship's papers, had gone down with the ship when it broke up and sank at about 2 a.m.

Thomas Bright secretly and separately wrote to London. He directly blamed Brooke for the loss of the ship and her crew, blaming Brooke's poor navigation and his failure to post a lookout. He said that after striking the reef, Brooke had hurriedly abandoned the ship and fled into the skiff. According to Bright, Brooke had departed the site immediately, leaving many men in the water to drown though the skiff had room for additional men. Bright's longboat was full to capacity and stood about a quarter-mile off the wreck due to the danger of capsizing if any of the men in the water attempted to climb on board. He further contradicted Brooke by stating the ship had not sunk until mid-morning the following day.

Subsequent analysis of these reports and other documents, as well as searches of the wreck site, raised suspicions that Brooke had secretly removed at least part of the silver into the skiff before the ship sank, and had managed to get it to Batavia without telling anyone.

== Discovery ==
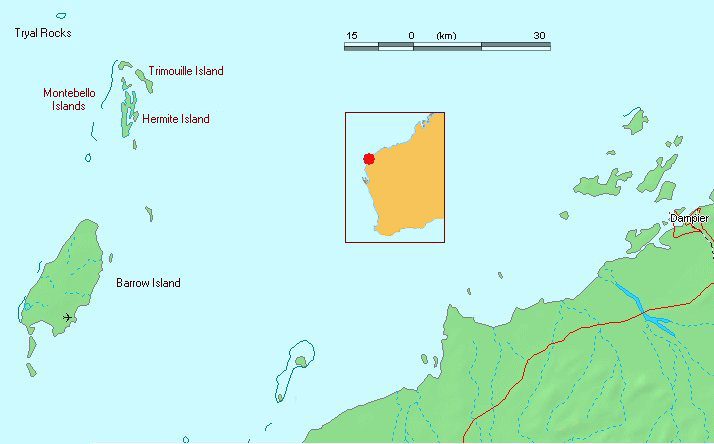
Montebello Islands and the Tryal Rocks

Due to Captain Brooke's actions, for well over three centuries there was great confusion as to the exact position of the Tryal Rocks. William Dampier, for example, was one mariner who searched for them. After examining the records and Thomas Bright's letter in 1934 historian Ida Lee proved that what was then known as Ritchie's Reef was the site. The Australia Pilot was subsequently amended and the reef renamed.

It was not until 1969 with the advent of recreational scuba diving on the Western Australian coast that the wreck was located after researchers John MacPherson and Eric Christiansen of the Fremantle-based Underwater Explorer's Club determined the position after examining Lee's research and the contemporary records. When an exploration team went to the south western side of the reef which Christiansen had predicted as being the likely location, diver Naoom Haimson almost immediately found the wreck. Members of the dive team were Christiansen, Haimson, Dave Nelley and Ellis Alfred (Alan) Robinson. Chris Muhlmann was skipper of the boat.

Shortly after the discovery, Robinson attempted an illegal salvage operation where his use of explosives badly damaged the wreck site. He had been involved in an earlier operation involving the wrecks Vergulde Draeck north of Perth and Zuytdorp north of Kalbarri. After he had illegally removed objects, including a bronze swivel gun and other artefacts, Robinson was apprehended in Shark Bay. Though he was later acquitted of using explosives on the Tryall, his actions in challenging the state Shipwrecks Acts when prosecuted for his actions, his salvage attempts, and his continual fights with the bureaucracy led to considerable press and his becoming dubbed in the media and in a subsequent film by Prospero Productions as the "Gelignite Buccaneer".

His challenge to the State Maritime Archaeology Act eventually led to enactment of Commonwealth legislation protecting wrecks around Australia. In 1983 Alan Robinson hanged himself in a Sydney prison while on trial on a charge of conspiring to murder his ex-wife.

Led by maritime archaeologist Jeremy Green, divers from the WA Maritime Museum followed up on an earlier Museum expedition under Harry Bingham and conducted a detailed examination of the wreck site in 1971. This was effected subsequent to the receipt of substantial sponsorship from Michael Kailis of Gulf Fisheries. The wreck was found divided into two main sections separated by a sand gully. Heavy swell made conditions very difficult and they precluded a detailed inspection of the easternmost section of the site.

While six cannon, and up to eight anchors of a type expected from the period and some small objects were recorded, no artefacts were found that allowed a positive identification of the site. While the number of anchors suggested a larger ship, the number of cannons pointed to a small vessel like Tryall; in the absence of definitive objects, to Green the evidence remained "equivocal" but he did conclude that the wreck was most likely Tryall. The consensus amongst maritime investigators is that it almost certainly is Tryall. The Museum's display in the Shipwreck Galleries at Fremantle houses a small number of recovered items, including a large iron cannon that was recovered on a later Museum expedition. In 2021,Trial wreck site was recorded in a 3D photogrammetric survey by Patrick Morrison of the Western Australian Museum, during the filming of the Disney+ television series Shipwreck Hunters Australia.

== See also ==
- Shipwrecks of Western Australia
