= The Super Mario Galaxy Movie (soundtrack) =

2026 soundtrack album by Brian Tyler

The Super Mario Galaxy Movie (Original Motion Picture Soundtrack)

Film score by Brian Tyler
- Released: April 1, 2026
- Recorded: November 2025–March 2026
- Studios: Eastwood Scoring Stage, Warner Bros. Studios
- Genre: Film score
- Length: 87:21
- Labels: Back Lot Music; iam8bit
- Producer: Brian Tyler

Brian Tyler chronology
Now You See Me: Now You Don't (2025)	The Super Mario Galaxy Movie (Original Motion Picture Soundtrack) (2026)

The Super Mario Galaxy Movie (Original Motion Picture Soundtrack) is the soundtrack album for the 2026 film of the same name, based on Nintendo's Mario video game franchise, created by Shigeru Miyamoto. The score for the film was composed by Brian Tyler, who previously composed the score for The Super Mario Bros. Movie (2023); Tyler incorporated and remixed the themes from the two Super Mario Galaxy games and other Super Mario titles, along with themes from the Star Fox series, under the collaboration of longtime Mario composer Koji Kondo.

The soundtrack was released by Back Lot Music and iam8bit on April 1, 2026, coinciding with the film's theatrical release, and received favorable reviews from critics.

== Production ==
On September 12, 2025, it was announced that Brian Tyler, who previously composed the musical score for The Super Mario Bros. Movie (2023), would return for the sequel. Before his involvement in the project, Tyler suffered a dual Intracerebral hemorrhage within 45 minutes, while he finished composing the score for Nuremberg (2025) in August 2025. During the time of his hospitalization, Tyler wrote much of the main themes without telling the team about his condition. He utilized the period of his recovery to write the film's score as he didn't want to let them down.

The score revisits the themes of Mario, Luigi, Princess Peach, and Bowser, while introducing new themes for Rosalina, Bowser Jr., and Yoshi. Tyler considered Bowser Jr.'s music to be mischievous as he wanted to impress his father Bowser by becoming the most nefarious he could possibly be, and Rosalina's theme featured a family theme, as her character searches for her long lost sister. Yoshi's theme had a jazzy, funky touch that also incorporates trap music.

Besides incorporating the predecessor's themes, he had kept around 300 easter eggs and references from the Super Mario game series in specific themes. Tyler felt enjoyable on writing music for any sequence that felt beautiful and heartfelt, as using those references, he could elevate the music on an emotional and audio-visual level thereby providing an immersive cinematic experience for the viewers in a way that is different from the video game. A 70-piece orchestra performed the score, and features arrangements of themes from the two Super Mario Galaxy games and other instalments in the Super Mario series. Koji Kondo, the original composer of most of the video games' music, served as the score consultant. The score was recorded at the Eastwood Scoring Stage at Warner Bros. Studios Burbank.

== Release ==
The film score was released digitally through Back Lot Music on April 1, 2026. iam8bit announced the physical launch of the film's soundtrack in double LP, digipak CD, and cassette. The company revealed their exclusive "Bowser Jr. inspired Wonder Armor Purple" vinyl priced for $42.99, while different color variants themed around Luma—"Luma Green" vinyl in FYE stores, "Luma Yellow" vinyl in retail stores, and "Luma Red" vinyl in Japan. The CD format is packaged in "Mario Red" and "Luigi Green" colored discs, while the cassette is packaged in a retro-throwback plastic-housed glass setting with a galactic backdrop. Both CD and cassette formats are priced at $19.99 and feature exclusive artwork from Scott Saslow. The physical release is scheduled for the third quarter of 2026.

== Reception ==
Zanobard Reviews wrote "Brian Tyler's soaring sequel soundtrack for The Super Mario Galaxy Movie expands on the first with brand new themes for Yoshi, Bowser Jr. and even the Mario Galaxy itself, while also returning to the impeccable motifs of the first film and Koji Kondo's ever-iconic sound for the games, overall resulting in a well orchestrated, theme-packed adventure that never ceases to delight."

Clint Worthington of RogerEbert.com admitted that the music "leans more on Brian Tyler's original orchestrations" owing to the less reliance on needle drops. Tim Grierson of Screen International said that "Brian Tyler's drab score does nothing to elevate derivative suspense sequences." Charles Pulliam-Moore of The Verge stated, "composer Brian Tyler's score morphs to allude to different Mario songs". Michael McWhertor of Polygon said, "Musically, the sequel plays it safe, with Brian Tyler's score relying on reworked clips from classic Mario video game soundtracks."

Zaki Hasan of the San Francisco Chronicle stated: "Brian Tyler's score occasionally reaches for something grander, even wistful, but it's lost in the sensory overload." Jonathan Sim of ComingSoon.net wrote, "One of the most noticeable improvements over the original film is its approach to music. While the first movie leaned heavily on recognizable pop songs, sometimes to a distracting degree, this sequel wisely pulls back, allowing composer Brian Tyler's score to take center stage." Brian Shea of Game Informer called it an "excellent score" which had shined due to the minimal use of pop songs.

== Track listing ==
All tracks are written by Brian Tyler, except where noted. Original Nintendo themes were written by Koji Kondo, Mahito Yokota, and other Nintendo composers.

The Super Mario Galaxy Movie (Original Motion Picture Soundtrack) track listing
No.	Title	Length
1.	"Super Mario Brothers Prelude"	1:23
2.	"Super Mario Galaxy"	4:38
3.	"Yoshi On the Go"	3:32
4.	"The Rise of Bowser Jr."	2:58
5.	"Cool Motorcycle Guys"	2:15
6.	"You're Coming with Me"	3:01
7.	"Trouble in the Pipes"	2:17
8.	"Junior and the Koopas"	3:15
9.	"Another Adventure Begins"	3:17
10.	"Star Shower"	2:44
11.	"Under Siege"	3:18
12.	"A Master Artist at Work"	3:22
13.	"A New World"	2:15
14.	"Cuteness for Crime"	2:26
15.	"Punishment by Parasol"	3:41
16.	"The Worst Place to Bee"	4:14
17.	"Taking Care of the Kingdom Isn't Easy"	4:40
18.	"The Flight Deck"	2:50
19.	"Dino Might"	5:43
20.	"Assault on Planet Bowser"	6:16
21.	"Your King Has Returned"	5:47
22.	"Family Is Forever"	3:46
23.	"Rebuilding the Castle"	5:46
24.	"1up"	3:57
Total length:		87:21

== Additional music ==
The following songs are featured in the film but are absent from the soundtrack:

- "Hypnotize" by The Notorious B.I.G.
- "That's Amore" by Jack Brooks and Harry Warren
- "Too Hot to Stop - Pt.1" by The Bar-Kays
- "Egg Planet (Party Mix)" by Spencer Ludwig (From Super Mario Galaxy; composed by Koji Kondo)
- "Peaches" by Jack Black, Aaron Horvath, Eric Osmond, John Spiker and Michael Jelenic

== Personnel credits ==
Credits adapted from Film Music Reporter:

- Music composer, producer and conductor: Brian Tyler
- Score consultant: Koji Kondo
- Score production advisor: Joe Lisanti
- Music editor: Joe Lisanti, Matthew Llewellyn
- Orchestrators: Dana Niu, Robert Elhai, Brad Warnaar, Andrew Kinney, Rossano Galante
- Recording and mixing engineer: Greg Hayes
- Score recordist: Larry Mah
- Assistant mixing engineer: Matt Friedman
- Music preparation: Eric Stonerook Music
- Librarian: Scott McRae Capehart
- Copyists: William Stromberg, Anne Stromberg, Janis Stonerook, Erin Cadoret, Stacy Stonerook, Jeffrey Stonerook, Jeffrey Stonerook, Sandra Garrett
- Musician contractor: Peter Rotter
- Choir conductor and contractor: Jasper Randall
- Musical arrangements: John Carey, Josh Zimmerman, Chris Forsgren, Kenny Wood, Max Lombardo, Evan Duffy, Drew Mikuska, Sam Mohart
- Score coordinator: Jackson Verolini
- Scoring crew: Thomas Hardisty, Richard Wheeler Jr., Peter Nelson, Brian Bair, Jamie Olvera

== Charts ==
Chart performance for The Super Mario Galaxy Movie (Original Motion Picture Soundtrack)
Chart (2026)	Peak position
Japanese Download Albums (Billboard Japan)	80
