= John Brooke =

John Brooke may refer to:

== Politicians ==
- John Brooke, 1st Baron Cobham (1575–1660), English politician and Royalist
- Sir John Brookes, 1st Baronet (c. 1635–1691), MP for Boroughbridge, also known as Sir John Brooke
- John Brooke (1755–1802), Warwickshire politician
- John Henry Brooke (1826–1902), Australian politician and journalist
- John R. Brooke (1838–1926), Civil War Union officer and governor of Cuba
- John Brooke, 2nd Viscount Brookeborough (1922–1987), Northern Ireland politician
- John Brooke alias Cobham (1535–1594), MP for Queenborough
- John Brooke Johnson Brooke (1823–1868), soldier and heir to the Raj of the Kingdom of Sarawak

== Others ==
- John Brooke (translator) (died 1582), English translator of religious works
- John Brooke (East India Company), 17th century commander of first British vessel to sight Australian mainland
- John Charles Brooke (1748–1794), English antiquarian, Somerset Herald
- John Mercer Brooke (1826–1906), inventor, officer in the United States and Confederate Navies
  - SS John M. Brooke, a Liberty ship
- John Brooke (priest) (1873–1951), Dean of Cape Town from 1932 to 1947
- John Weston Brooke (1880–1908), British officer and explorer
- John Brooke (British historian) (1920–1985), British historian
- John L. Brooke (born 1953), American historian
- John Hedley Brooke (born 1944), professor of science and religion
- John Balmain Brooke (1907–1992), New Zealand teacher, yacht designer and engineer

== See also ==
- John Broke, MP for Marlborough
- John Brookes (disambiguation)
- John Brooks (disambiguation)
