= Greyhound (1816 ship) =

UK merchant ship 1816–1821

History

United Kingdom
- Name: Greyhound
- Namesake: Greyhound
- Owner: T. Ritchie (1819)
- Builder: Java
- Launched: 1816
- Fate: Burnt 1821

General characteristics
- Tons burthen: 223, or 229 (bm)

Greyhound was launched at Java in 1816. She burnt there in 1821.

In 1818 Greyhound took on Calcutta registry.

Greyhound, Captain Thomas Ritchie, left Bengal on 7 October 1817 bound for Port Jackson. On the way she stopped at Bencoolen, Batavia, and the Derwent (Hobart). She delivered to Port Jackson seven convicts as well as merchandise. She also carried a passenger, Lieutenant Hector Macquarie of the 86th Regiment, the nephew of Governor Lachlan Macquarie.

On this journey Ritchie rediscovered the Tryal Rocks. He did not recognise them as such, however, as the Tryal Rocks were then thought not to exist, and they had previously been thought to be well to the west of Ritchie's reef. In 1920, Ritchie's discovery was published as "Ritchie's Reef"; it was also sometimes referred to as "the Greyhound's Shoal".

In 1819 Greyhound's master was C.F.Hunter, and her owner was Ritchie.

Greyhound burnt at Rat Island, a small island west of Bencoolen, in February 1821 due to an accident with cooking utensils.
