= Now You See Me: Now You Don't (soundtrack) =

Now You See Me: Now You Don't (Original Motion Picture Soundtrack)

Film score by Brian Tyler
- Released: November 14, 2025
- Recorded: 2025
- Genre: Film score
- Length: 73:53
- Label: Lakeshore
- Producer: Brian Tyler

Brian Tyler chronology
| Nuremberg (2025) | Now You See Me: Now You Don't (Original Motion Picture Soundtrack) (2025) | The Super Mario Galaxy Movie (2026) |

Now You See Me: Now You Don't (Original Motion Picture Soundtrack) is the soundtrack album to the 2025 film Now You See Me: Now You Don't directed by Ruben Fleischer, which is the third instalment in the Now You See Me franchise and the sequel to Now You See Me 2 (2016). The film score is composed by Brian Tyler and released through Lakeshore Records on November 14, 2025.

== Background ==
In June 2025, it was announced that recurrent franchise composer Brian Tyler would return to score Now You See Me: Now You Don't. Tyler recalled that he liked scoring the film, as he did for the first two, because of his exciting collaboration with the directors and producers as well as the incredibly unique musical language developed in the series. He added that the music combines elements which often are thought to be opposites: symphonic, jazz and electronic.

Tyler admitted that there was a live band component to these films, with him playing drums, vibraphone, piano and guitars. However, in this film, Tyler used electronic sub-genres like drum, bass and drill for the new members of the team. This element provided a larger-than-life theatrical experience, which in turn also becomes emotional, transcendent and exciting. Tyler recalled his experience on doing stage magic in his childhood and being enamored with music, thus bringing together multiple elements which he found fascinating in his life.

Reneé Rapp performed an original song for the film, titled "Lucky" which she co-wrote it with Alexander 23, Ryan Tedder, Omer Fedi and Ali Tamposi. The song was released as a single on October 30, 2025. Two tracks from the album, "Now You Don't" and "Now You See Me", released on November 6. The album was released the same day as the film, on November 14, through Lakeshore Records.

== Reception ==
Filmtracks wrote "the score may be a lesser sibling compared to the other two but is still a whole lot of fun when it cooks, and it offers more than enough snazzy material to add to its predecessors on a compilation." Eric Goldman of IGN wrote "Returning composer Brian Tyler once more does a lot of heavy lifting here, giving the film a rousing, engaging score that elevates several key sequences." Owen Gleiberman of Variety and Tim Grierson of Screen International called the score "zany" and "fantastic".

== Track listing ==
| No. | Title | Length |
|---|---|---|
| 1. | "Now You Don't" | 3:02 |
| 2. | "Now You See Me" | 3:01 |
| 3. | "Upstaged" | 2:26 |
| 4. | "Through the Looking Glass" | 3:44 |
| 5. | "One Night Only" | 4:38 |
| 6. | "Photoshoot" | 2:57 |
| 7. | "Upstage Boogie" | 1:38 |
| 8. | "Even the Rooms Are Tricks" | 1:18 |
| 9. | "The Great Escape" | 2:09 |
| 10. | "Life of Magic and Mystery" | 2:24 |
| 11. | "The Pickup" | 1:29 |
| 12. | "A Twist in the Tail" | 3:20 |
| 13. | "Priceless" | 2:57 |
| 14. | "Projections" | 2:14 |
| 15. | "Who Nose" | 2:29 |
| 16. | "Inversion" | 3:21 |
| 17. | "The Horsemen Return" | 3:30 |
| 18. | "Up is Down, Left Is Right" | 3:09 |
| 19. | "Room Service" | 2:06 |
| 20. | "The Vandenberg Family" | 4:45 |
| 21. | "History Lesson" | 4:26 |
| 22. | "Every Good Trick Has a Twist" | 4:40 |
| 23. | "Shoot the Car" | 1:58 |
| 24. | "The Principles of Escape" | 4:02 |
| 25. | "The Eye Always Watches" | 2:20 |
| Total length: | | 73:53 |

== Additional music ==
The list of songs which were featured in the film, but not included in the soundtrack:

- Angelina Jordan – "Diamond"
- Geese - "Crusades"
- Lady Gaga – "Abracadabra"
- Balu Brigada – "What Do We Ever Really Know"
- Reneé Rapp – "Lucky"
- James Brown – "Get on the Good Foot" (first trailer)
- Run-DMC – "It's Tricky" (second trailer)
