= Jon Brooks (disambiguation) =

Jon Brooks (born 1968) is a Canadian folk singer-songwriter.

Jonathan or Jon Brooks may also refer to:

- Jon Brooks (American football) (born 1957), American football linebacker
- Jonathon Brooks (American football) (born 2003), American football running back
- Jonathan Brooks (priest) (1774–1855), Archdeacon of Liverpool
- Jon Brooks, British musician who performs as The Advisory Circle, Georges Vert, and King of Woolworths
- Mandy Brooks (Jonathan Joseph Brooks, 1897–1962), American baseball player
- Jonathan Brooks, director of Imagination Station Science Museum

== See also ==
- Jonathan Brooks House, a historic house in Medford, Massachusetts
- Jon Brookes (1969–2013), English drummer of The Charlatans
- John Brookes (disambiguation)
- John Brooks (disambiguation)
