= Volta do mar =

Archaic navigational technique

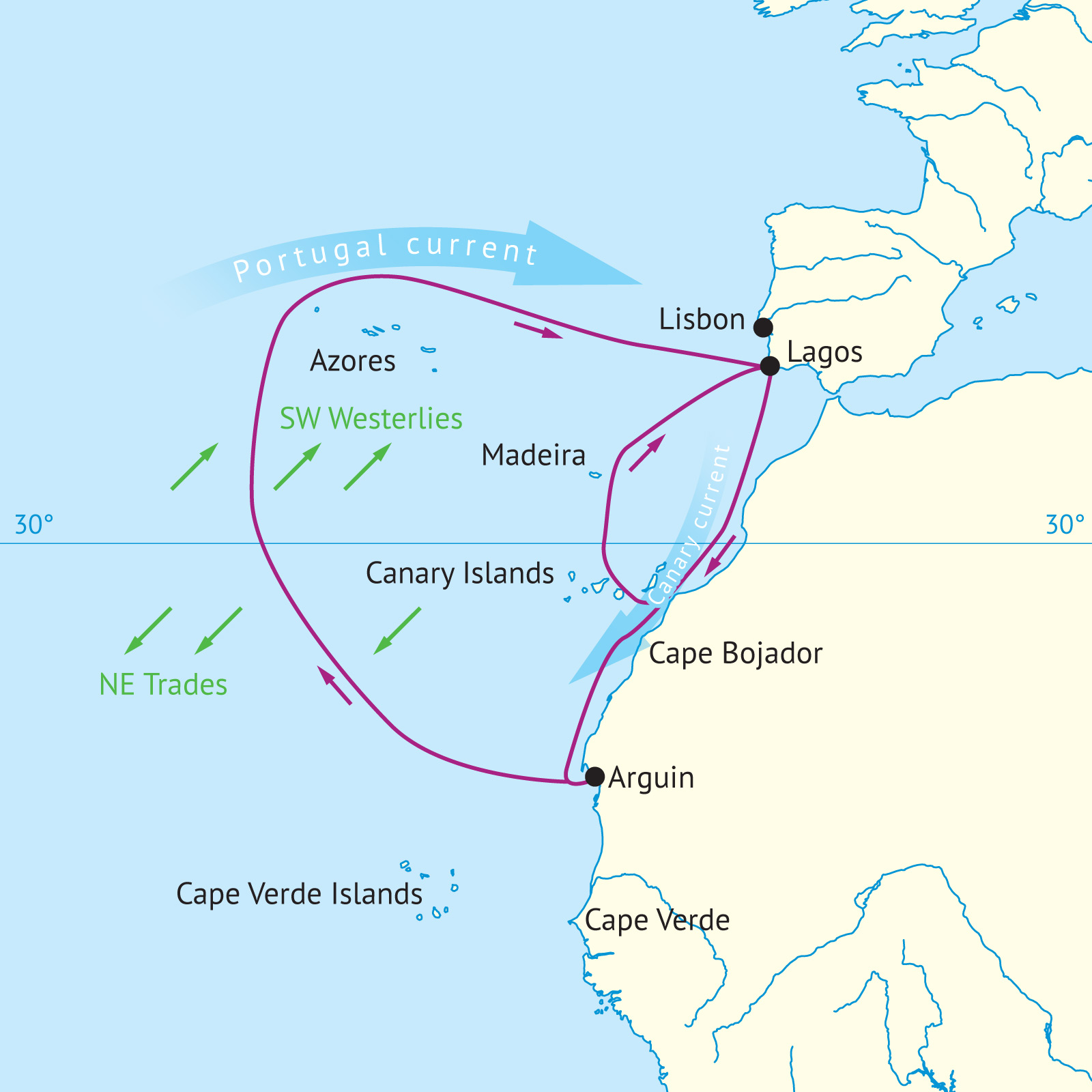
Atlantic winds (green), currents (blue) and approximate Portuguese sailing routes (red) during Henry the Navigator's (c.1430–1460) lifetime. The further south ships went, the wider off sailing required to return

Volta do mar, volta do mar largo, or volta do largo (the phrase in Portuguese means literally 'turn of the sea' but also 'return from the sea') is a navigational technique perfected by Portuguese navigators during the Age of Discovery in the late fifteenth century, using the dependable phenomenon of the great permanent wind circle, the North Atlantic Gyre. This was a major step in the history of navigation, when an understanding of winds in the age of sail was crucial to success: the European sea empires would not have been established without an understanding of the trade winds.

== History ==
=== Portuguese discovery in the Atlantic Ocean ===
The volta do mar was a sailing technique discovered in successfully returning from the Atlantic islands, where the pilot first had to sail far to the west in order to catch usable following winds, and return to Europe. This was a counter-intuitive sailing direction, as it required the pilot to steer in a direction that was perpendicular to the ports of Portugal. Lack of this information may have doomed the 13th-century expedition of Vandino and Ugolino Vivaldi, who were headed towards the Canary Islands (as yet unknown by the Europeans) and were lost; once there, without understanding the Atlantic gyre and the volta do mar, they would have been unable to beat upwind to the Strait of Gibraltar and home. Discovering this technique was crucial for returning from future discoveries; for example Christopher Columbus would never have returned from the Americas without applying the volta do mar by sailing northwards from the Caribbean through the Horse Latitudes to catch the prevailing mid-latitude westerlies.

A similar phenomenon occurs in the South Atlantic, with the exception that the South Atlantic Gyre circulates counterclockwise. As India-bound Portuguese explorers and traders crossed the equator with the intention of passing the entire western coast of Africa, their voyages took them far to the West (in the vicinity of Brazil.)

=== Application to the Pacific Ocean – the Manila Galleon ===
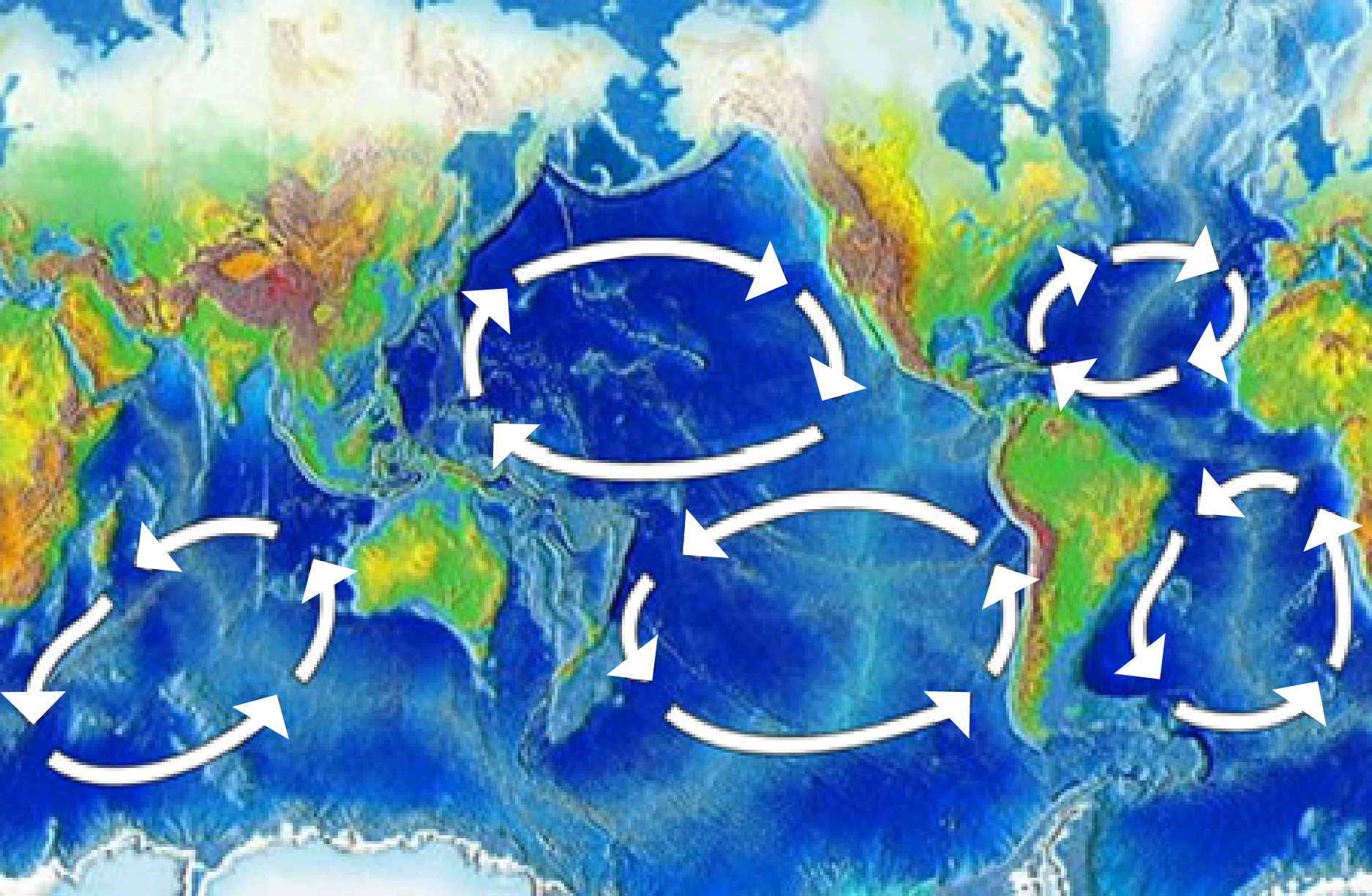
Map of the five major ocean gyres

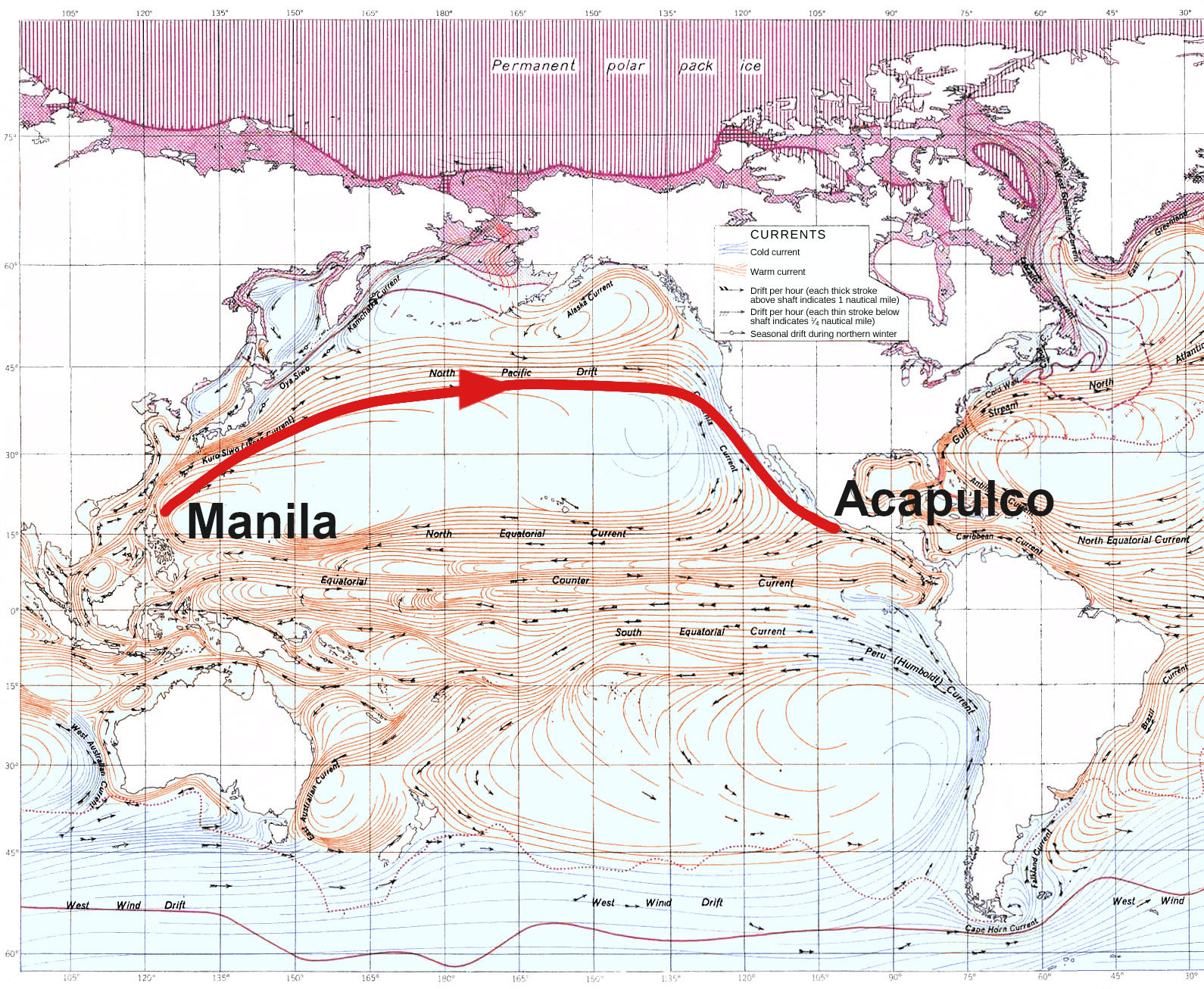
Route from Philippines to Acapulco, Mexico

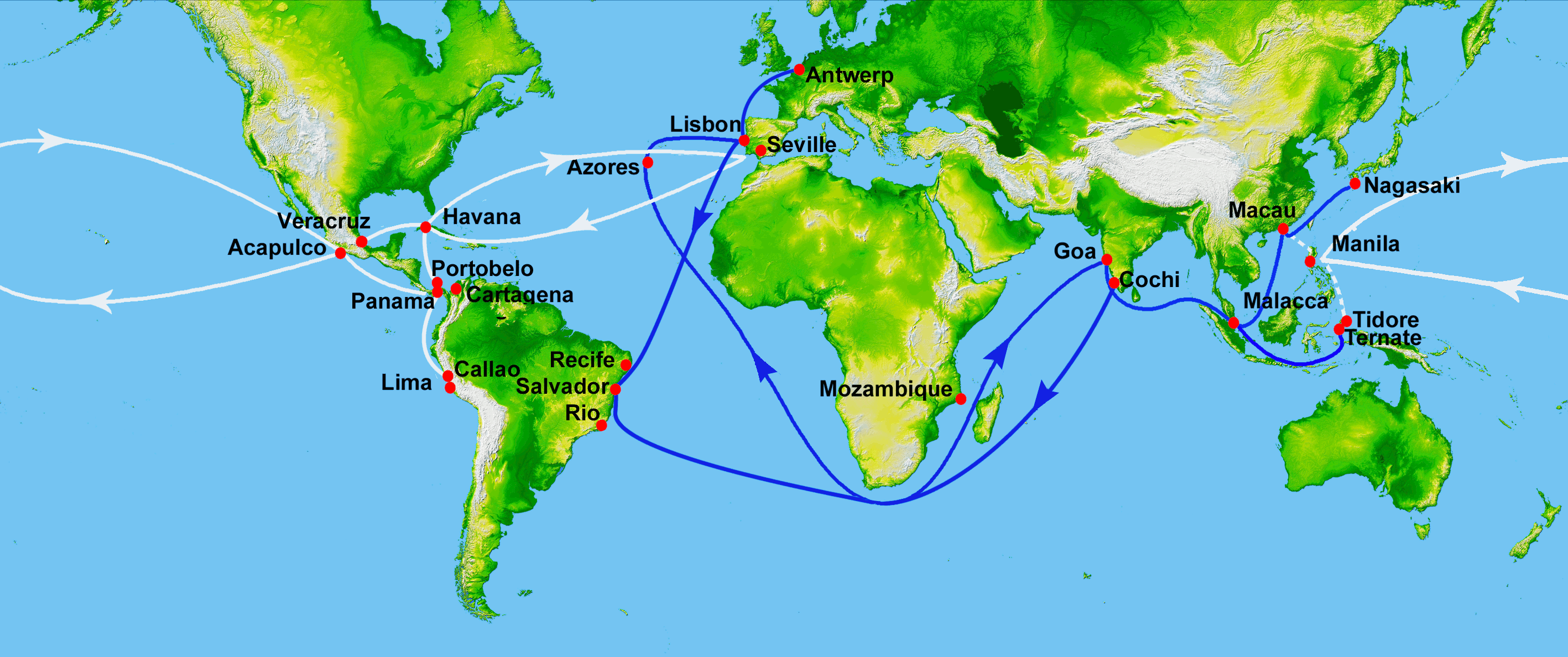
Portuguese trade routes (blue) and the Spanish trade routes (white). Portuguese ships went almost to Brazil before rounding Africa and to the Azores before turning east to Lisbon. The Spanish Manila galleons used the northern Trade winds going west and the westerlies going east.

The route of the Manila Galleon from Manila to Acapulco depended upon successful application of the Atlantic phenomenon to the Pacific Ocean: in discovering the North Pacific Gyre, captains of returning galleons had to reach the latitudes of Japan before they could safely cross. The discovery, upon which the Manila-Acapulco galleon trade was based, is owed to the Spanish Andrés de Urdaneta, who, sailing in convoy under Miguel López de Legazpi, discovered the return route in 1565: the fleet split up, some heading south, but Urdaneta reasoned that the trade winds of the Pacific might move in a gyre as the Atlantic winds did. If, in the Atlantic, ships made the Volta do mar to the west to pick up winds that would bring them back from Madeira, then, he reasoned, by sailing far to the north before heading east, he would pick up the westerlies to bring him back to the west coast of North America. Though he sailed to 38 degrees North before turning east, his hunch paid off, and he hit the coast near Santa Catalina Island, California, then followed the coast south to Acapulco. Most of the crew was suffering from scurvy and only 18 remained strong enough to sail the ship.
