= Jack Brooks =

Jack Brooks may refer to:

- Jack Brooks (footballer) (1904–1973), English right-back during 1924–1934
- Jack Brooks (lyricist) (1912–1971), English-born American pop song lyricist
- Jack Brooks (American politician) (1922–2012), from Texas, Chairman of House Judiciary Committee
- Jack Brooks (Welsh politician) (1927–2016), Baron Brooks of Tremorfa
- Jack Brooks (cricketer) (born 1984), English right arm medium fast bowler

== See also ==
- Jack Brooks Federal Building, 1933 American edifice in Beaumont, Texas
- Jack Brooks Regional Airport, 1944 American airport in Port Arthur, Texas
- Jack Brooks: Monster Slayer, 2007 Canadian comedy horror film
- John Brooks (disambiguation)
- Brooks (surname)
