= Tryal Rocks =

Uninhabited Australian reef

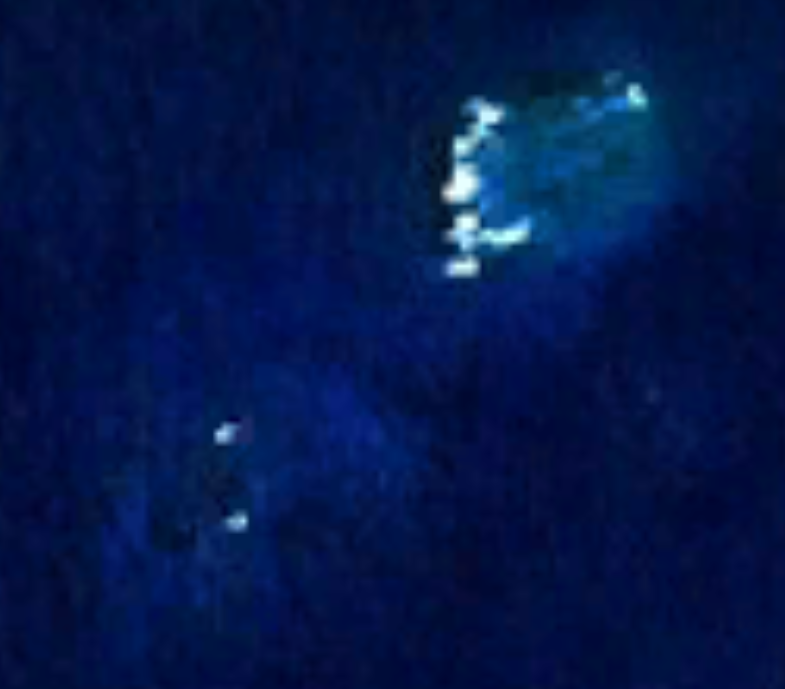
Closeup of Tryal Rocks

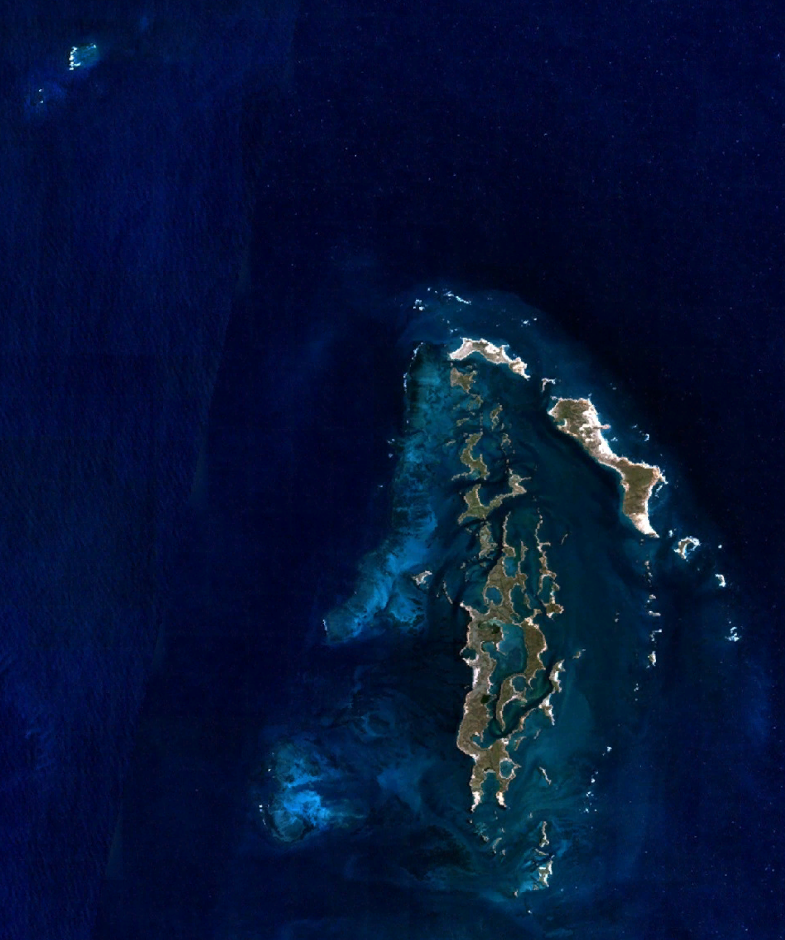
The Montebello Islands, with Tryal Rocks in the top left hand corner

Tryal Rocks, sometimes spelled Trial Rocks or Tryall Rocks, formerly known as Ritchie's Reef or Greyhound's Shoal, is a reef of rock located in the Indian Ocean off the northwest coast of Australia, 14 kilometres (8.7 mi) northwest of the outer edge of the Montebello Islands group. It is named for the Tryall, the first known shipwreck in Australian waters, which sank after striking the then-uncharted rocks in 1622. Described as "the theme and dread of every voyager to the eastern islands", their location was sought by mariners for over three centuries before finally being determined in 1969.

== Location and description ==
Tryal Rocks are located at 20°16′S 115°23′E. They are 14 kilometres (8.7 mi) northwest of the Montebello Islands, 105 kilometres (65 mi) off the Australian mainland and part of the state of Western Australia.

The rocks and the immediate locale are described as: "two coral reefs, close together, about 1.25 miles (2.01 km) in length NE-SW; the S reef dries 2.7 metres (8 ft 10 in). The rocks are located about 9 miles (14 km) NW of Montebello Islands. Depths of less than 20 metres (66 ft) lie within 6 miles (9.7 km) SW and 4 miles (6.4 km) NW of Tryal Rocks; the sea breaks on these shallower depths in bad weather. A 5.5 metres (18 ft) patch lies 3 miles (4.8 km) W of North West Island Light. The channel between Tryal Rocks and Montebello Islands is 7 miles (11 km) wide, with depths of 31 to 40 metres (102 to 131 ft), and may be used by vessels proceeding to the E side of Barrow Island."

== History ==
=== Wreck of the Tryall ===
The Tryall was only the second English ship to attempt to sail from the Cape of Good Hope to Batavia (now Jakarta, Indonesia) along the Brouwer Route, a route pioneered by the Dutch and used routinely by them since 1616. The Brouwer Route drastically shortened voyage times by keeping ships sailing eastwards in the Roaring Forties for as long as possible before turning north. The captain of the Tryall, John Brookes, grossly underestimated the longitude of the ship, and ended up around 1,000 kilometres (620 miles) farther east than the route specified. On turning north, the Tryall found itself skirting the west coast of Australia. Around 11pm on 25 May 1622, it struck the Tryal Rocks and sank. 46 of 139 lives were saved, including Brookes.

Brookes' subsequent report was extremely vague; it did not even give a position for the wreck. James Henderson characterises this as deliberate obfuscation, an attempt to avoid the blame for being so far off course. Consequently, the Tryal Rocks were originally thought to be well to the west of their actual location. Concerned for the threat to their own ships, the Dutch placed the reef on their charts, but "exactly south of the western extremity of Java according to the statements made by the English sailors". This represents an error of around ten degrees of longitude.

=== Searches ===
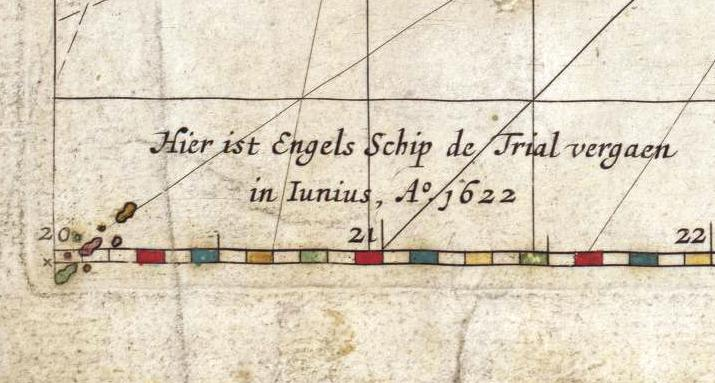
Detail from the bottom left corner of Hessel Gerritsz's 1627 map Caert van't Landt van d'Eendracht ("Chart of the Land of Eendracht"), showing a feature labelled Hier ist Engels Schip de Trial vergaen in Iunius, A° 1622 ("Here the English ship Trial was wrecked in June 1622"). This is the first known appearance of the Tryal Rocks on a map

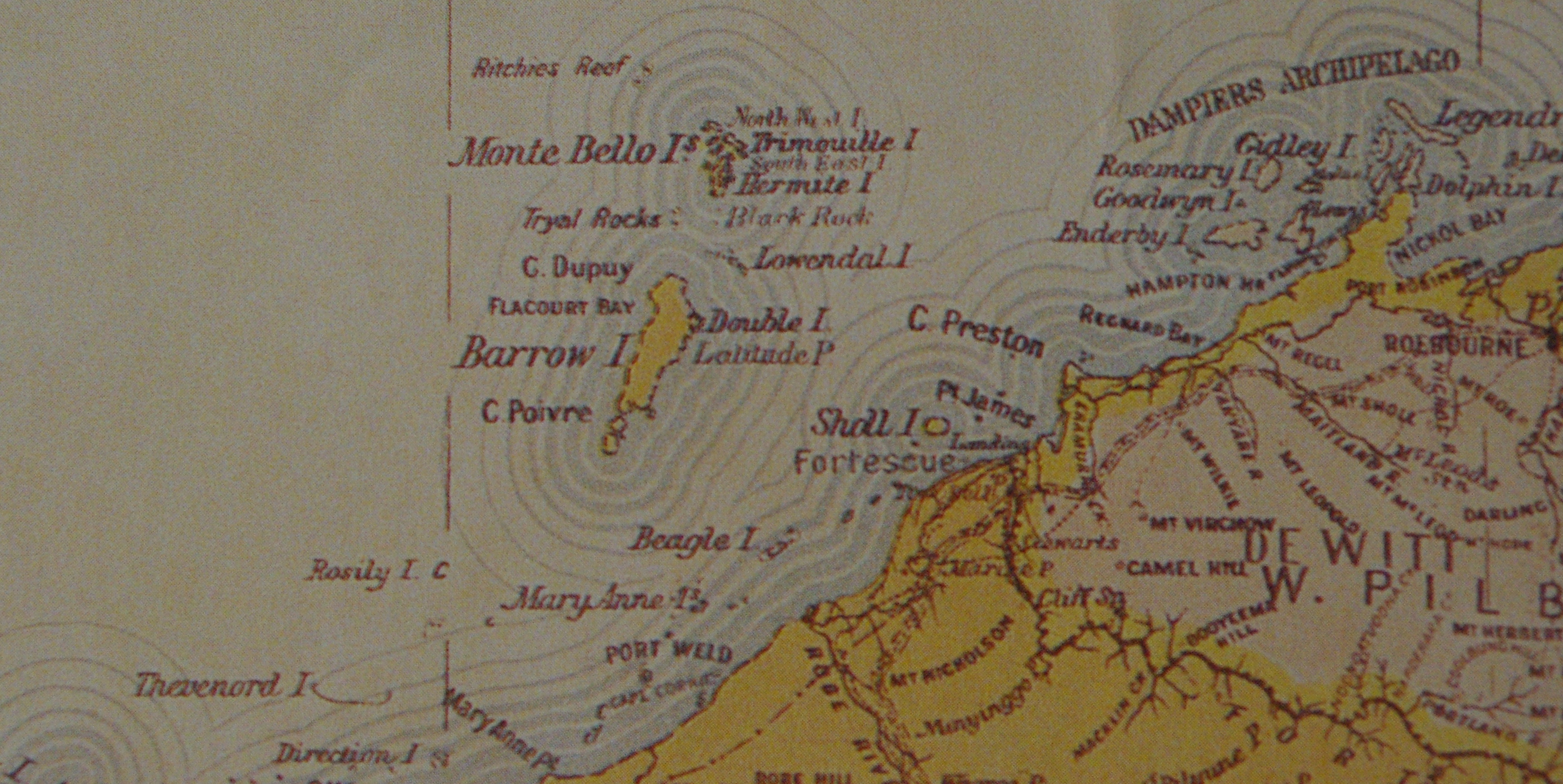
A section from an 1897 map of Western Australia showing "Ritchies Reef"

The first known appearance of the Tryal Rocks on a map was in 1627, when Hessel Gerritsz published his Caert van't Landt van d'Eendracht ("Chart of the Land of Eendracht"). In the extreme bottom left corner of this map is a feature labelled Hier ist Engels Schip de Trial vergaen in Iunius, A° 1622 ("Here the English ship Trial was wrecked in June 1622").

Numerous Dutch and English sailors searched for the rocks over the centuries. The first attempt was in 1636, when two Dutch ships were sent to search for the Tryal Rocks at their purported location. Sickness prevented William Dampier from searching for the rocks in 1700; on 11 June of that year he wrote: "I kept on my course to the westward till the 15th, and then altered it. My design was to seek for the Tryal Rocks; but, having been sick 5 or 6 days without any fresh provision or other good nourishment aboard, and seeing no likelihood of my recovery, I rather chose to go to some port in time than to beat here any longer."

The Tryal Rocks continued to be marked on charts, but gradually sailors began to doubt their existence. In 1705, the captain of the Jane wrote in his journal: "Hove to, according to custom, on account of the Tryal Rocks (if they exist), for although they are reported to extend 20 league in length I was informed by the Commodore of the Dutch Ships... that he had never heard of these rocks being seen." He went on to correctly surmise that "If they exist they must lie much farther east than in the route toward Java Head."

Matthew Flinders undertook a thorough search for the Tryal Rocks in April 1803, but found nothing, and concluded that "It should appear from our examination, that the Trial Rocks do not lie in the space comprehended between the latitudes 20° 15' and 21° south, and the longitudes 103° 25' and 106° 30' east." Consequently, the British Admiralty declared them non-existent.

In 1818, the British brig Greyhound, captained by Lieutenant Ritchie, encountered the true Tryal Rocks. They were not recognised as such, however, as the Tryal Rocks were then thought not to exist, and they had previously been thought to be well to the west of Ritchie's reef. In 1920, Ritchie's discovery was published as "Ritchie's Reef"; it was also sometimes referred to as "the Greyhound's Shoal".

In October 1820, Phillip Parker King suggested that the Tryal Rocks were the Montebello Islands: "May not the Tryal Rocks also be some of the low islands that skirt the coast? ...There remains no doubt in my mind but that Barrow's Island and Trimouille Island, and the numerous reefs around them, are the identical Tryal Rocks which have been the theme and dread of every voyager to the eastern islands for the two last centuries... the only argument against the probability of this supposition is their longitude; but during the month of July the current sets with great strength to the westward and might occasion considerable errors in ships' reckoning, which, in former days, were so imperfectly kept that no dependence can be placed upon them." This error was repeated in 1846, when John Lort Stokes placed the Tryal Rocks between the Montebello Islands and Barrow Island. Admiralty Sailing Directions of 1917 further claimed that "Tryal Rocks awash at high water are near the outer edge of the S.W. part of Monte Bello Islands reef and five miles (8.0 km) off the North extreme of Barrow Island".

In 1928, Commander Rupert Gould made a survey of the area and declared that Ritchie Reef was definitely the Tryal Rocks. Final confirmation of this came in 1969, when an exploration team found the wreck of the Tryall there.
