= John Brooks (rugby union) =

English rugby union player

John Brooks (born 11 November 1977), was a rugby union player for Harlequins in the Guinness Premiership. He also played for the England Saxons, including starting all the matches in the victorious Churchill Cup team of 2007, beating the New Zealand Māori in the final.

Brooks' position of choice was as a prop.

He currently works as a Sports Doctor in Australia.

He has a PhD in the Epidemiology of Rugby Injuries and set up the England Rugby Injury and Training audit, one of the world's largest injury databases. He has over 30 research publications, including articles in the BJSM, AJSM and BMJ.

Brooks provided assistant commentary at some of Harlequins home games on BBC Sport, alongside Sara Orchard.
