= John Brooke (East India Company) =

17th-century British East India Company naval commander

John Brooke (also Broock, Brookes, Brooks) was a seaman of the British East India Company and commander of the first British crew to sight the Australian continent.

== East India Company ==
Brooke joined the East India Company and, in July or August 1621, he was appointed master of the Tryal.

== Wrecks ==
Brooke was assigned the task of making the first British East India Company voyage across the Indian Ocean while keeping no further north than the 35th parallel, to take advantage of the "Roaring Forties", then to turn sharply north making for Bantam, west Java (then Batavia). Sailing the Tryal along the 39 degree parallel, he miscalculated and overshot by some 1,000 kilometres, coming upon the west coast of the Australian continent on 5 May 1622 at 22 degrees, in the vicinity of North West Cape. Attempting a northward track thereafter along the coast, at about 11 pm on 25 May 1622, the Tryal twice struck what was later to become known as Ritchie's Reef and, after discovery of the wreck in 1969, Tryal Rocks.

Brooke and nine others, including his son, took to a skiff, leaving the 128 crew to scramble for a place on the longboat. Thirty-six made the longboat, leaving 92 to perish.

Brooke's skiff and the longboat made east Java by 8 June and, calling at Bantam en route, Batavia ("Jaccatra") on 25 June 1622, with the loss of just one more life during the weeks at sea. The longboat was just three days behind.

Brooke's account of the event differs from that of the Tryal's factor Thomas Bright. Brooke reported having ordered the ship's valuables be stowed in the longboat but that the men had refused his orders and thrown them overboard, thus accounting for their absence. Bright's less improbable report was that Brooke had stowed them on the skiff and stolen them.

For his return to England, Brooke was given command of the, as he claimed, infested Moone, leaving Batavia in February 1625. The vessel was wrecked upon their arrival off the coast of Dover, with the loss of 50,000 pounds in treasure.

== Controversy ==
Thomas Bright accused Brooke of theft of company valuables and dishonesty in dealing with his crew upon the wreck of the Tryal. Bright's account was rejected and Brooke absolved of blame.

Brooke was accused of scuttling the Moone and theft of the jewels. Proceedings were brought against him. He was imprisoned until August 1626 when charges were dropped and he was released.

== Legacy ==
The John Brookes gas field, one of Australia's largest, on the Tryall Rocks Terrace, near Barrow Island, was discovered and named for him in 1998, with the first well there named for Thomas Bright.
