= John Brooks (footballer, born 1927) =

English footballer (1927–2018)

Personal information
- Full name: John Brooks
- Date of birth: 8 March 1927
- Place of birth: Stoke-on-Trent, England
- Date of death: 9 July 2018 (aged 91)
- Place of death: Stoke-on-Trent, England
- Position: Midfielder

Senior career*
Years	Team	Apps	(Gls)
1950–1951	Stoke City	2	(0)
- Eccleshall Town
- * Club domestic league appearances and goals

John Brooks (8 March 1927 – 9 July 2018) was an English footballer who played in the Football League for Stoke City.

== Life and career ==
Brooks was born in Stoke-on-Trent and played in the youth ranks at Stoke City. He made two appearances in the first team during the 1950–51 season but failed to make it as a professional footballer and entered amateur football with Eccleshall Town.

He died in Stoke-on-Trent in July 2018 at the age of 91.

== Career statistics ==
Appearances and goals by club, season and competition
Club	Season	League			FA Cup		Total	
Club	Season	Division	Apps	Goals	Apps	Goals	Apps	Goals
Stoke City	1950–51	First Division	2	0	0	0	2	0
Career total			2	0	0	0	2	0
