= John Brookes (footballer, born 1943) =

English footballer

Personal information
- Full name: John Vincent Brookes
- Date of birth: 18 October 1943 (age 83)
- Place of birth: Staveley, England
- Height: 5 ft 10 in (1.78 m)
- Position: Forward

Senior career*
Years	Team	Apps	(Gls)
–1964	Sheffield United	0	(0)
1964–1965	Sheffield Wednesday	0	(0)
1965–1966	Southport	14	(5)
1966	York City	1	(0)
1966–1967	Sligo Rovers		
1967	Boston Shamrock Rovers	0	(0)
1967–1968	Sligo Rovers		
1968	Cleveland Stokers	22	(1)
1968–1970	Sligo Rovers		
1970–1971	Stockport County	21	(3)
1971–197?	Matlock Town		
- Worksop Town
- * Club domestic league appearances and goals

John Vincent Brookes (born 18 October 1943) is an English former footballer who played as a forward.

== Career ==
Brookes began his career with Sheffield United, before joining Sheffield Wednesday in 1964. After not making a league appearance for the club, he joined Southport in 1965, making 14 appearances in the Football League and scoring 5 goals. He made one appearance for York City in 1966, before signing for Sligo Rovers by manager Shay Keogh in late 1966. He went on to enjoy a successful career in Ireland with Rovers, while also having brief stints in the United States with the Boston Shamrock Rovers in 1967 and the Cleveland Stokers of the North American Soccer League in 1968. He spent the 1970–71 season with Stockport County before transferring to Matlock Town. He played for Matlock Town through at least the 1975–76 season, and later also appeared for Worksop Town.
