= Hendrik Brouwer =

Dutch explorer, navigator and colonial administrator (1581–1643)

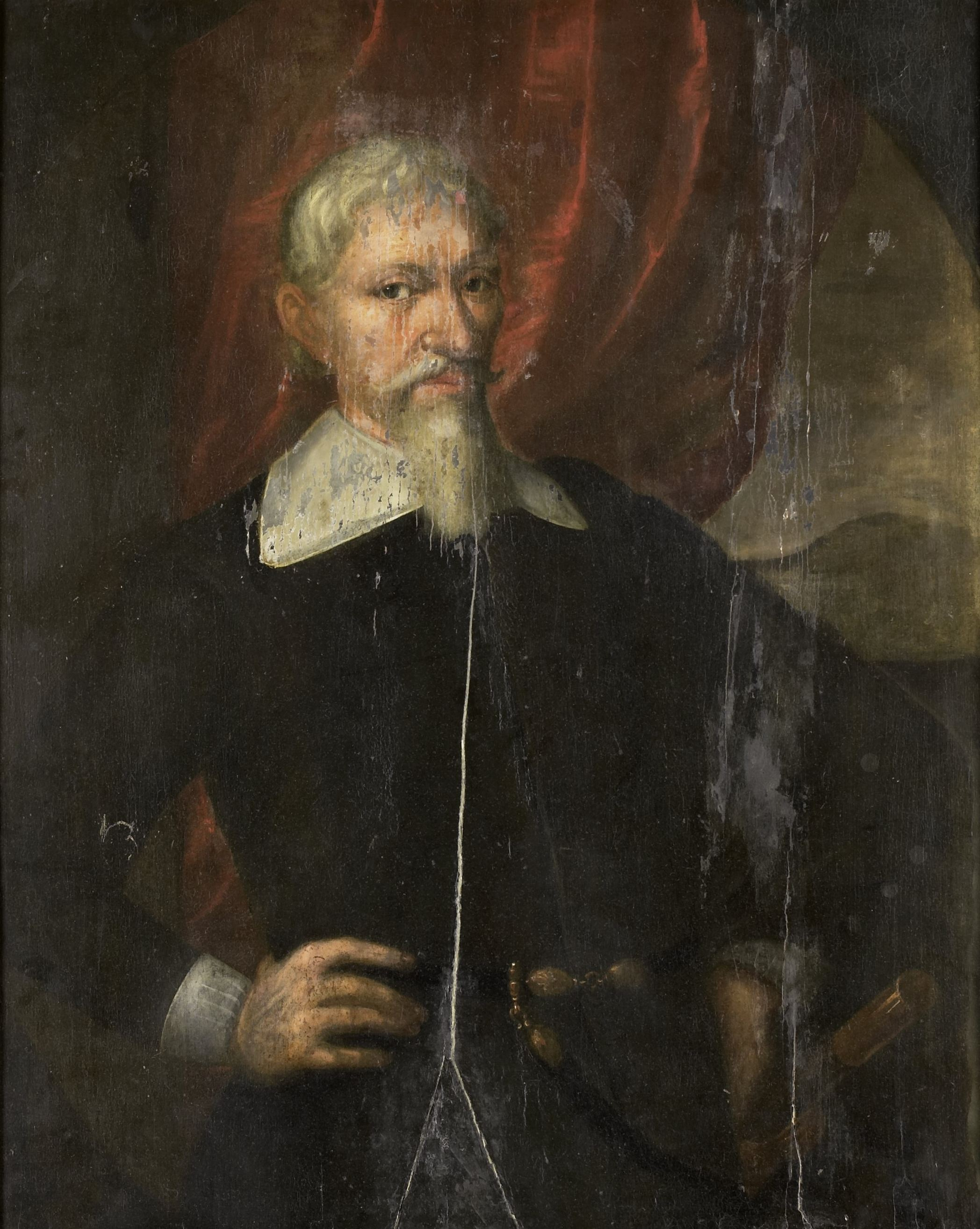
- Anonymous portrait

Governor-General of the Dutch East Indies
- In office 18 April 1632 – 1 January 1636
- Preceded by: Jacques Specx
- Succeeded by: Antonio van Diemen

Personal details
- Born: Unknown date, 1581 Spanish Netherlands
- Died: 7 August 1643 (aged 61–62) Puerto Inglés, Chile

Hendrik Brouwer (Dutch pronunciation: [ˈɦɛndrɪɡ ˈbrʌu.ər]; 1581 – 7 August 1643) was a Dutch explorer and governor of the Dutch East Indies.

== East Indies ==
Brouwer is thought to first have sailed to the Dutch East Indies for the Dutch East India Company (VOC) in 1606. In 1610, he left again to the Indies, now as commander of three ships. On this trip he devised the Brouwer Route, a route from South Africa to Java that reduced voyage duration from a year to about six months by taking advantage of the strong westerly winds in the Roaring Forties – latitudes between 40° and 50° south.

Up to that point, the Dutch had followed a route copied from the Portuguese via the coast of Africa, Mauritius and Ceylon. By 1617, the VOC required all their ships to take the Brouwer route.

After his arrival in 1611 in the East Indies, he was sent to Japan to replace Jacques Specx temporarily as opperhoofd at Dejima from 28 August 1612 to 6 August 1614. During that time he made a visit to the Japanese court at Edo. In 1613, he made a trip to Siam that laid the foundation for the Dutch trade with Siam.

Early in 1632, he was part of a delegation sent to London to solve trade disagreements between the Honourable East India Company and Dutch East India companies. Afterwards he left for the Indies, and on 18 April of that same year he was appointed Governor-General of the Dutch East Indies, again following Jacques Specx, a position which he held until 1 January 1636. Anthony van Diemen was his assistant during this entire period, and many of the Dutch explorations into the Pacific carried out under Van Diemen's command were suggested in writing by Brouwer before he left.

== Chile ==
In 1642, the VOC joined the Dutch West India Company in organizing an expedition to Chile to establish a base for trading gold at the abandoned ruins of Valdivia. The fleet sailed from Dutch Brazil where John Maurice of Nassau provided them with supplies. While rounding Cape Horn, the expedition established that Isla de los Estados was not part of the unknown southern land.

After making landfall on Chiloé Island, Brouwer made a pact with native Huilliches to aid in establishing a resettlement at Valdivia. However, on 7 August 1643, at the age of 62, Hendrik died in Puerto Inglés before his arrival at Valdivia, and was succeeded by his vice-admiral, Elias Herckmans, who landed at the ruins on 24 August. The embalmed body of Brouwer was buried in Valdivia, by then renamed Brouwershaven, on September 16. Brouwershaven remained occupied by Herckmans and his men until 28 October.

Having been told that the Dutch had plans to return to the location, the Spanish viceroy in Peru sent 1,000 men in 20 ships in 1644, to resettle Valdivia and fortify it. The viceroy also sent 2,000 men by land, who never made it. The Spanish soldiers in the new garrison disinterred and burned Brouwer's body.
