= Roaring Forties =

Southern Hemispheric westerly winds

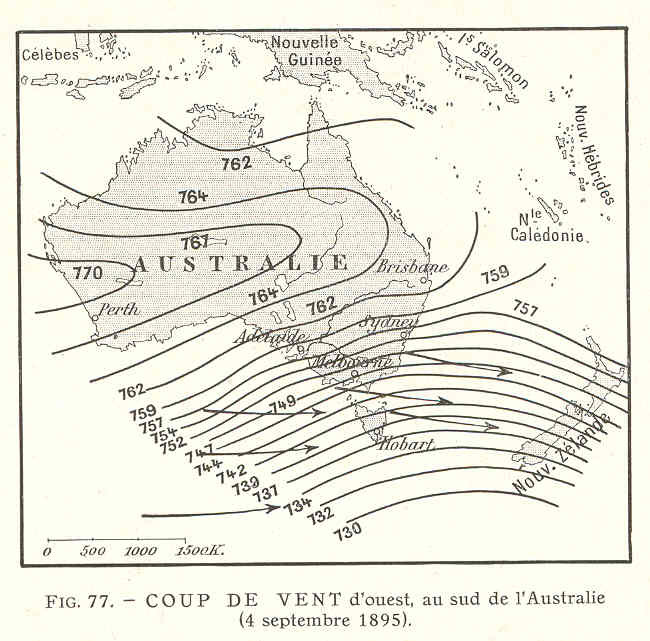
Roaring Forties as they contract towards southern Australia (observed in September 1895).

The Roaring Forties are strong westerly winds that occur in the Southern Hemisphere, generally between the latitudes of 40° and 50° south. The strong eastward air currents are caused by the combination of warm air being displaced upward from the Equator towards the South Pole, Earth's rotation, and the scarcity of landmasses to serve as windbreaks at those latitudes. On average, winds speeds in the region measure around 10 m/s (36 km/h) with peak gusts of over 25 m/s (90 km/h).

The Roaring Forties were a major aid to ships sailing the Brouwer Route from Europe to the East Indies or Australasia during the Age of Sail, and in modern times are favoured by yachtsmen on round-the-world voyages and competitions. The boundaries of the Roaring Forties are not consistent: the wind-stream shifts north or south depending on the season. The strong and continuous winds in the Roaring Forties make this zone advantageous for wind power in places such as New Zealand and Tasmania.

Similar winds that occur at more southerly latitudes are called the Furious Fifties and the Shrieking or Screaming Sixties, with the greatest winds near the former. These prevailing winds(winds that blow from an area of high pressure to an area of low pressure) have been moving farther south over time due to climate change.

== Dynamics ==
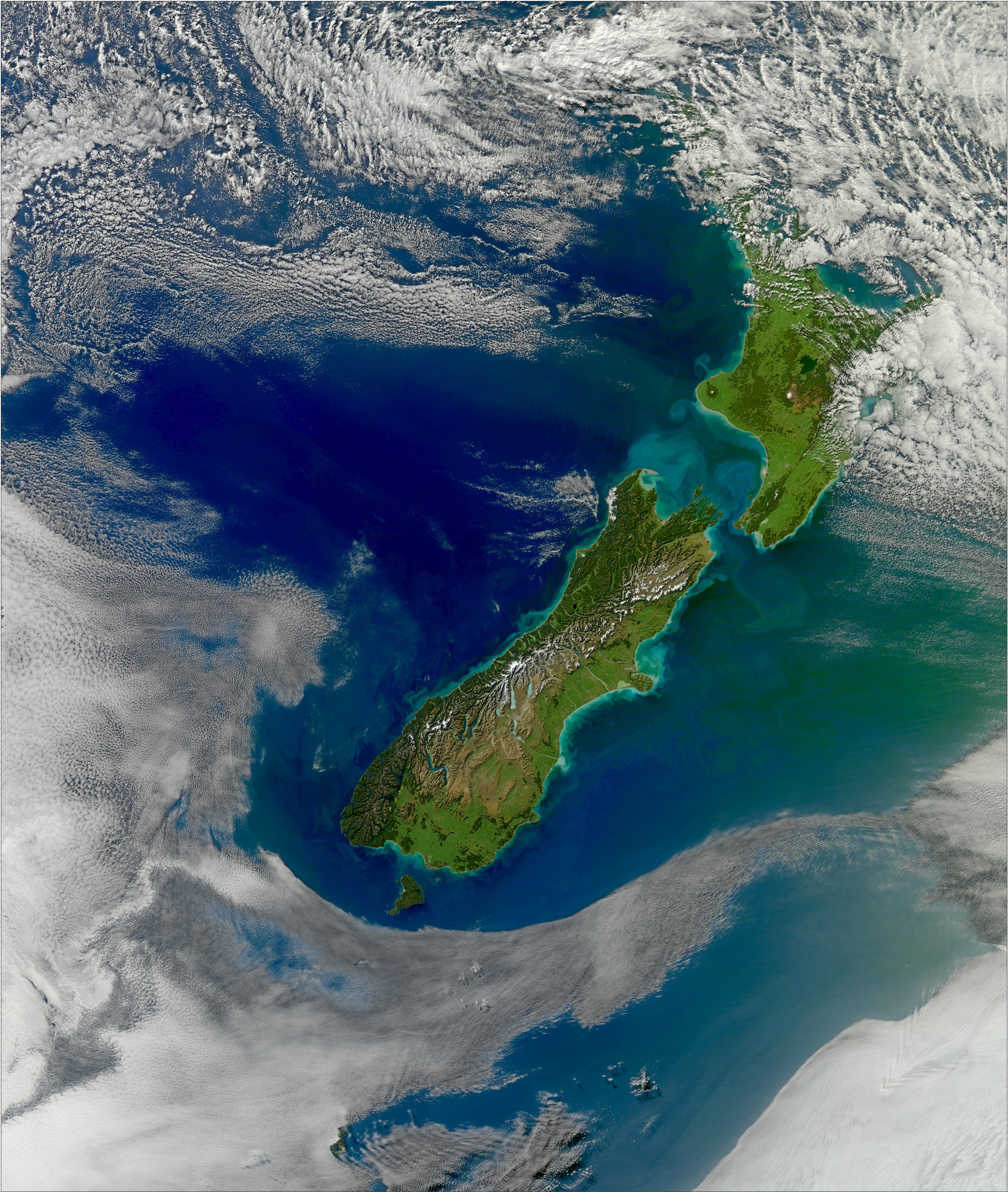
The Roaring Forties in the Cook Strait of New Zealand produce high waves, and erode the shore as shown in this image

Hot air rises at the Equator and is pushed towards the poles by cooler air travelling towards the Equator (an atmospheric circulation feature known as the Hadley Cell). At about 30°S, the outward-travelling air sinks to lower altitudes, and continues toward the poles closer to the ground (the Ferrel Cell), then rises up again from about 60°S as the air joins the Polar vortex. This travel in the 30°–60°S zone combines with the rotation of the earth to move the air currents from west to east, creating westerly winds.

The large tracts of open ocean south of 40°S are interrupted only by Tasmania, New Zealand, and the southern part of South America. These relatively small obstructions, which are themselves bordered by large tracts of open water along their southern shores, allow high wind speeds to develop – much higher than near 40°N, where the large continents of Eurasia and North America impede the flow of circum-planetary westerly winds. The latitude ranges for the Roaring Forties and similar winds are not consistent: all shift towards the South Pole in the southern summer, and towards the Equator in the southern winter. Wellington, the capital of New Zealand, is known as "Windy Welly" because it is one of the few cities situated in these gusty latitudes.

== Use for sailing ==
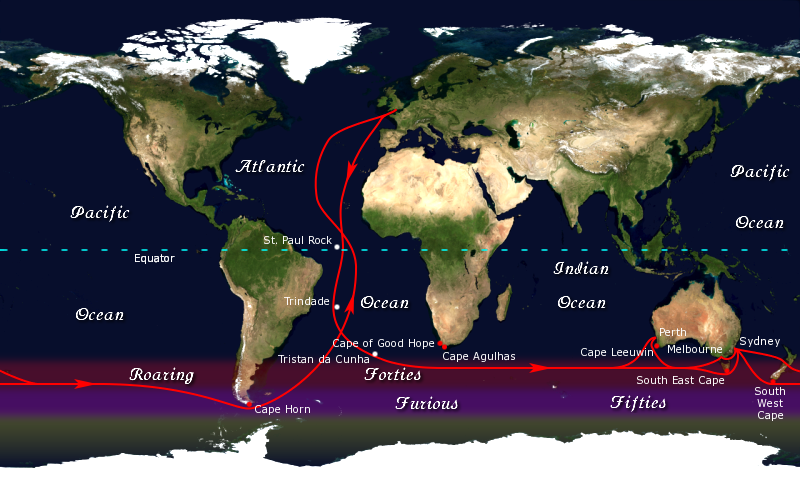
The Clipper Route, taken by ships sailing from Europe to Australia in order to take advantage of the Roaring Forties

During the Age of Sail, ships travelling from Europe to the East Indies or Australasia would sail down the west coast of Africa and round the Cape of Good Hope to use the Roaring Forties to speed their passage across the Indian Ocean, then on the return leg, continue eastwards across the Pacific Ocean and south of Cape Horn before sailing up the east coast of the Americas to home.

It was first used by Dutch explorer Hendrik Brouwer in his Brouwer Route, discovered in 1611, which effectively halved the duration of the trip from Europe to Java, down from a year or more to 5 months and 24 days. "To run the easting down" was the phrase used to describe the fast passages achieved in the Roaring Forties.

Modern round-the-world sailors also take advantage of the Roaring Forties to speed travel times, in particular those involved in record attempts or races. An old sailor's expression goes, "below 40 degrees south, there is no law; below 50 degrees, there is no God."

== Impact of pollution ==
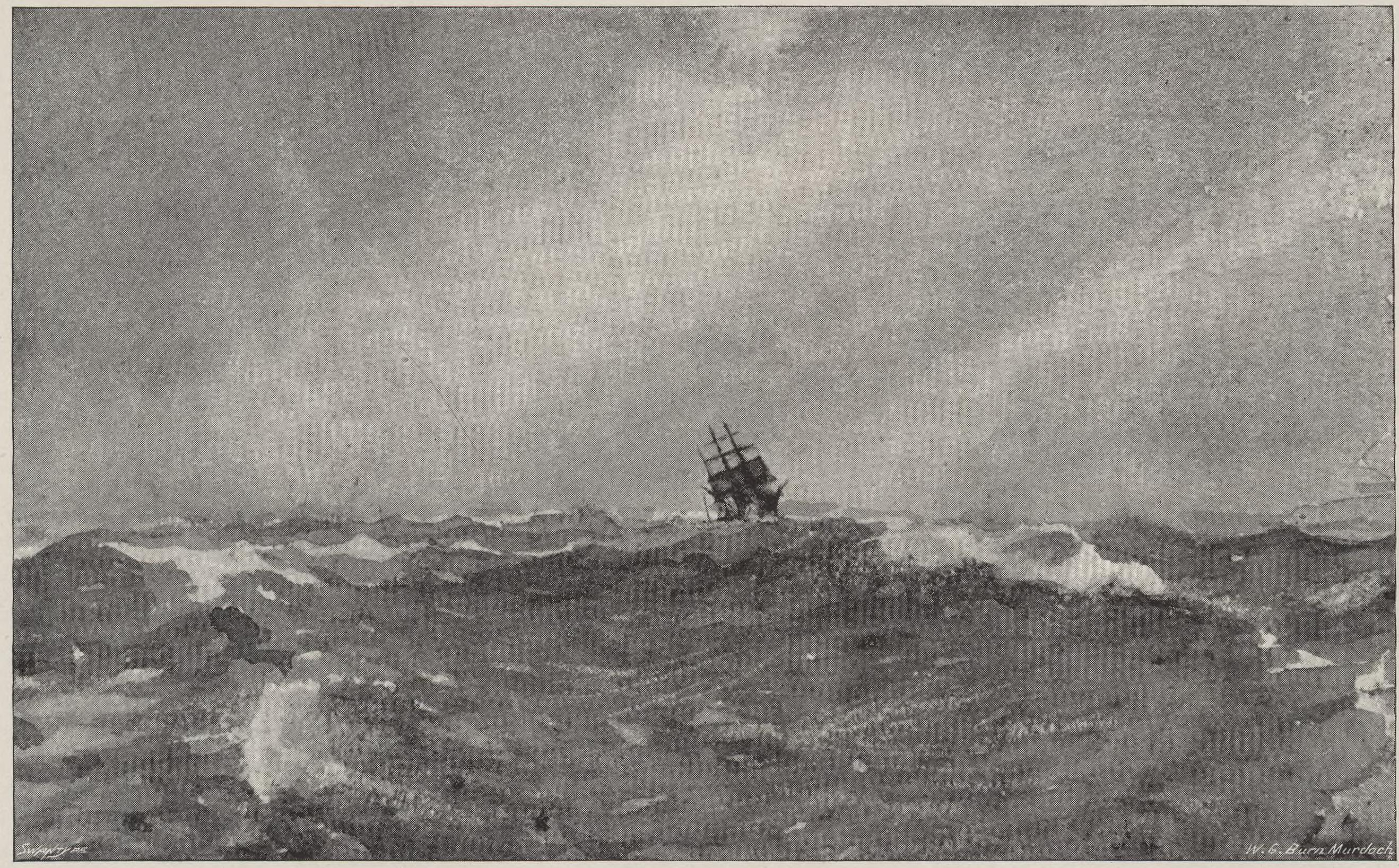
A drawing of a square rigged ship with shortened sail passing through the Roaring Forties

The peak band of winds has moved approximately 2.5 degrees south in the late 20th century, from a combination of human-induced ozone depletion and greenhouse gas emissions. This has caused faster warming across much of southern Australia (especially in winter) and less rainfall in Western Australia. Wind speeds between 50 and 60 degrees have also increased.

== Popular culture ==
The story Easting Down by Shalimar describes the events that befall a steamship unwisely venturing into the Roaring Forties to achieve a faster passage.

In 1982, French filmmaker Christian de Chalonge directed The Roaring Forties, a drama movie inspired by the death of Donald Crowhurst, a British sailor who perished in the 1969 Sunday Times Golden Globe Race.

== See also ==
- Antarctic Circumpolar Current
- Clipper route
- Doldrums
- Antarctic oscillation
- Southerly buster
- Subtropical ridge
- Winds in the Age of Sail
