= Casuarina (schooner) =

Purchased by Nicolas Baudin at Port Jackson (Sydney)

History
- Name: Casuarina
- Owner: Republic of France
- Builder: Kable & Underwood, Sydney, New South Wales
- Cost: 15 Bolts of Canvass, 4 Cwt of Gunpowder, One Ton of Bolt & Square Iron, 150 Gallons of Spirits, 16 Cwt of Cordage, & £50 Cash
- Acquired: September 1802
- Commissioned: Port Jackson, Sydney, 23 September 1802
- Decommissioned: Mauritius (Isle-of-France) 29 August 1803

General characteristics
- Class & type: schooner
- Tons burthen: 30 tons
- Length: 29 feet
- Complement: 14 men

The Casuarina schooner was purchased by Nicolas Baudin at Port Jackson (Sydney) in 1802, during the Baudin expedition to Australia. The vessel took its name from the local casuarina timber used in her construction.

Purchase of Vessel

KABLE & UNDERWOOD to Captain Nicolas BAUDIN: 'Sir, You having a wish for that Boat now in our possession, we here Send you our proposals for her, and mention the Articles We Expect for the purchase; / Viz. / Two Hundred and Thirty Gallons of Rum; Fifteen Bolts of Canvass; Sixteen Hundred-weight of Rope; One Ton of Bolt and Rod Iron; half a Barrel of Gunpowder; and Fifty Pounds Sterling in Cash - - - For which Articles we will Finish her and make her Compleat And in the Water, Except Oakum, Copper for Sheathing, Copper Nails, and Brown paper— All her Spars shall be Compleat. Fit for Rigging— Yours &etc. JAMES UNDERWOOD, HENRY KABLE. July 7, 1802'

GOVERNOR KING to BAUDIN: 'Sir, 11 July 1802. I had the honour of receiving yours of yesterday. As the vessel you request to purchase is the property of an individual, and as I have no reason to suppose His Majesty's Ministers will disapprove of my acceding to your wish, as it is for the advancement of science and navigation, I shall take it upon myself the responsibility of allowing you that permission, to which I am the more inclined from the peculiarity of your situation. I have, &c. PHILIP GIDLEY KING'

James UNDERWOOD to Captain BAUDIN: 'Commodore N. Baudin, September 1802. Bought of Messrs Henry Kable & J. Underwood A Vessel Upwards of 30 Tons Burthen Paid 15 Bolts of Canvass, 4 Cwt of Gunpowder, One Ton of Bolt & Square Iron, 150 Gallons of Spirits, 16 Cwt of Cordage, By Cash £50. Received the Contents for self & Etc. J. UNDERWOOD'

Crew

(Ages upon entry in crew-roll or as recruited; town of origin; rank/position on board):

FREYCINET, Louis Claude DeSaulces de, 21, Montélimar. Sub-Lieutenant. Commander of le Casuarina, under secondment from le Naturaliste

BOULLANGER, Charles Pierre, 29, Paris. Geographic Engineer

DEBRÉVEDENT, Léonard François, 22, Le Havre. Seaman 1st class. Disembarked at Kupang, 31 May 1803

RANSONNET, Jacques Joseph, 22, Liege. Midshipman 2nd class. Embarked at Kupang, 31 May 1803

BRUÉ, Adrien Hubert, 15, Paris. Novice 2nd class

CHIRON, Louis, 17, Isle-of-France. Novice 2nd class

CLAVEAU, Antoine. La Rochelle. 2nd Caulker

DUFLOS, Adrien Victor, 24, Fécamp. Seaman 1st class

HARDY, [Partly illegible: Benoitte?] Pierre, 21, Rouen. Seaman 4th class

HORVILLE, Louis François Xavier, 19, Le Havre. Seaman 4th class

LAMY, Jean-Baptiste Pascal, 27, Le Havre. Boatswain

LELIEVRE, Pierre Louis Michel, 28, Caloire. Coxswain 3rd class [Stand in for LeThiers]

LENÔTRE, Jean Nicolas, 17, Le Havre. Novice Seaman 1st class

LETHIERS, Jean-Baptiste Robert, 27, Rouen. Coxswain 2nd class

MARTIN, Pierre Alexandre, 21, Rouen. Seaman 3rd class

MARUQUE/MARUC, Guillaume. Age unknown. Seaman

SOUDAY, Nicolas Auguste, 22, Le Havre. Assistant Sailmaker 4th class

John DOE, [English Sealer, LYONS?] Embarked on board Casuarina at King Island, 6 December 1802, as either Cook or Carpenter. Transferred to the Hunter (Capt Campbell), Kupang, 27 May 1803

Baudin left France with two ships, Géographe and Naturaliste. The Naturaliste was sent home from King Island, Bass Strait, with the specimens collected to date. The Casuarina, under Louis de Freycinet, then accompanied Géographe on the expedition, and conducted the close inshore survey work not possible in the larger vessel.

By July 1803 Baudin and many of the crew were ill; Baudin abandoned the survey to return home to France. In September 1803 Baudin died at Isle de France (Mauritius), and the Casuarina was abandoned there.

Disarming of Vessel

Nicolas BAUDIN to the Administrators-General of the Isle-of-France and of Reunion. 'Citizen. /. the schooner of the Republic, the Casuarina, which I had constructed at Port Jackson for replacing the Naturalist; sent to France completely loaded with objects of natural history that we collected during our Sojourns on the coast of New Holland and elsewhere, having Separated from me in the crossing from the Port of King George to Willem River, I have given orders to Citizen Freycinet, the lieutenant de vaisseau in command, of reaching the Isle-de-France and handing over his ship in order to be employed in the service of the colony however you judge convenable. I think that this officer will be well pleased to keep command until the epoch of my return which is why I pray you of well wanting to permit him to do so. As I account of going as soon as possible into the Gulf of Carpentaria to complete in entirety the instructions of the government, I cannot furnish you the precise time of my arrival at Isle-de-France, however I think of being in that place in eight or ten months at the latest. /. I shall not enter in detail for the moment into what we have done and discovered, but I think that the government will be content and the public satisfied. /. Salut & respect N.B.'
