= Pierre Faure =

French geographer (1777–1855)

Pierre Ange François-Xavier Faure (1777, Nantes – 1855) was a French geographer who participated in the expedition to the South Seas that Nicolas Baudin led between 1800 and 1803 and that was back in March 1804 in Lorient.

Installed first on the Naturaliste during this voyage of scientific exploration, he was the first to see and draw the plan of Faure Island, an island in Shark Bay on the Western Australian coast to which the expedition gave his name.

He boarded the Géographe at Port Jackson on 3 November 1802. On 15 décembre 1803, at his request, he left the end of the expedition when it stopped at île de France on its return.

Pierre Faure was a corresponding member of the Société des observateurs de l'homme.

== Bibliography ==
- Nicolas Baudin, Mon voyage aux Terres australes, journal personnel du commandant Baudin, imprimerie nationale, 2000
- Dany Bréelle, Les Géographes de l'expédition Baudin et la reconnaissance des côtes australes, in Michel Jangoux (éd) Portés par l'air du temps: les voyages du capitaine Baudin, numéro spécial d'"Études du XVIIIe siècle", XXXVIII, 2010, (p. 213–223)
