= Baudin expedition to Australia =

1800–1803 French expedition to map the coast of Australia

The Baudin expedition (French: Expédition Baudin) of 1800 to 1803 was a French expedition to map the coast of New Holland (now Australia). It was approved by Napoléon Bonaparte and Nicolas Baudin was selected as its leader. It started with two ships, Géographe, captained by Baudin, and Naturaliste, captained by Jacques Hamelin, and was accompanied by nine zoologists and botanists, including Jean-Baptiste Leschenault de la Tour, François Péron and Charles-Alexandre Lesueur, as well as the geographer Pierre Faure. The expedition was considered a great success, as it produced the Freycinet Map of 1811, the first full map of Australia, and discovered more than 2500 new species.

== History ==
=== Expedition ===
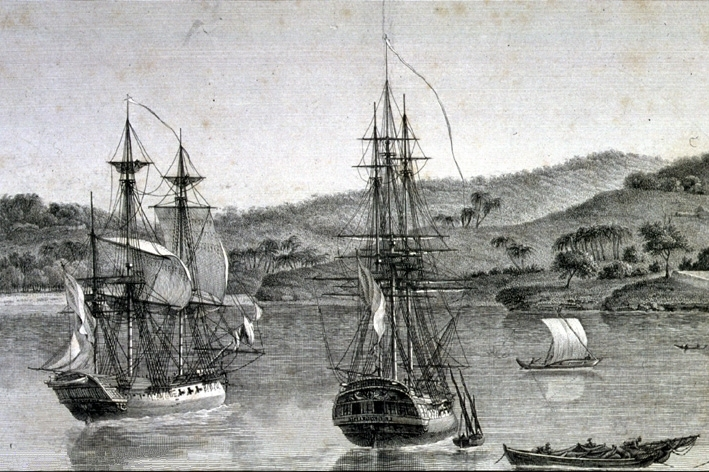
Géographe and Naturaliste

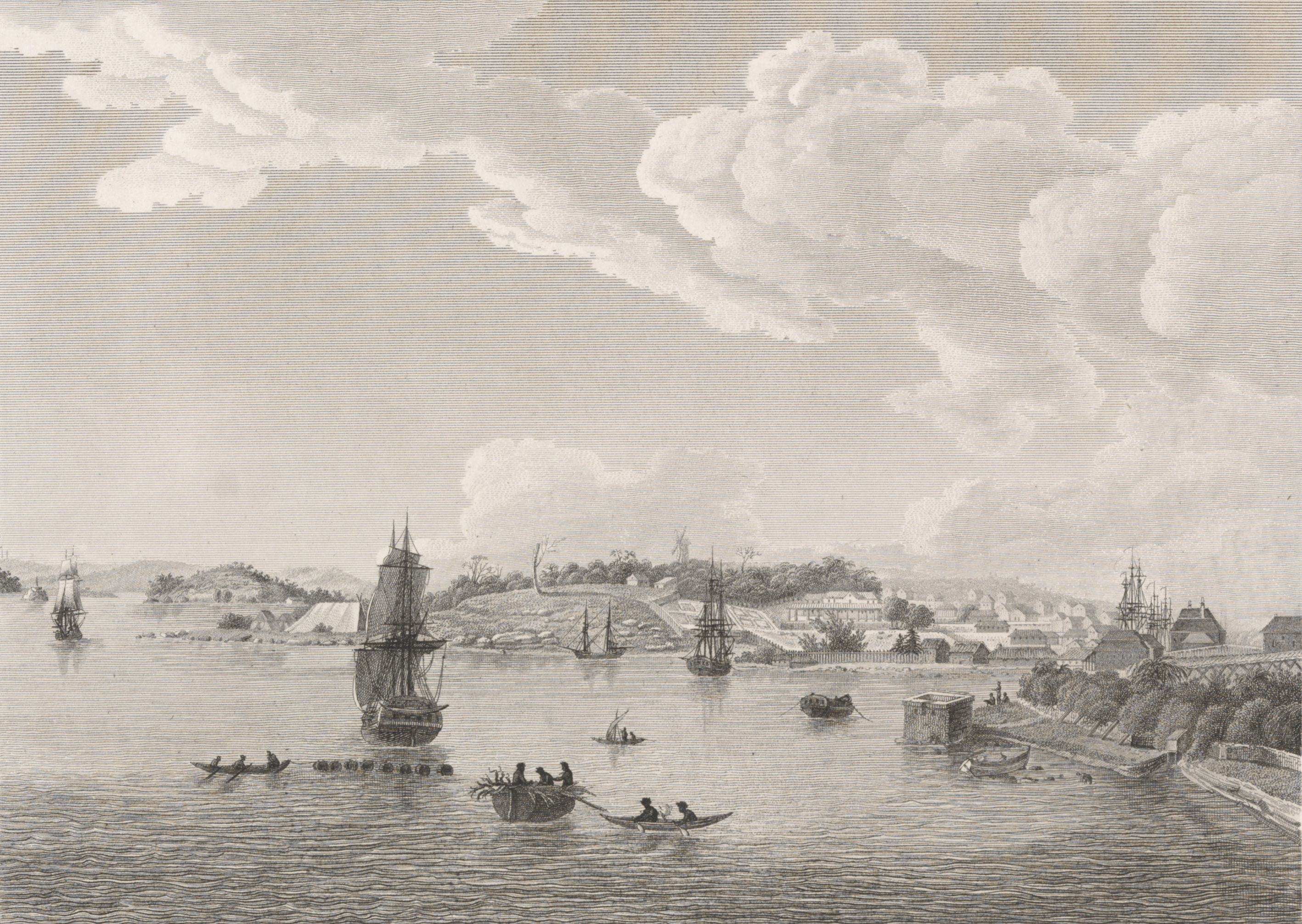
Sydney during visit by Baudin, c. 1802, engraving based on work by Charles Alexandre Lesueur

Napoléon Bonaparte, as First Consul, formally approved the expedition "to the coasts of New Holland", after receiving a delegation consisting of Baudin and eminent members of the Institut National des Sciences et Arts on 25 March 1800. The explicit purpose of the voyage was to be "observation and research relating to Geography and Natural History."

The Baudin expedition departed Le Havre, France, on 19 October 1800. Because of delays in receiving his instructions and problems encountered in Isle de France (now Mauritius) they did not reach Cape Leeuwin on the south-west corner of the continent until May 1801. Upon rounding Cape Naturaliste, they entered Geographe Bay. During their exploration here they lost a longboat and a sailor, Assistant Helmsman Timothée Vasse. They then sailed north, but the ships became separated and did not meet again until they reached Timor. On their journeys Géographe and Naturaliste surveyed large stretches of the north-western coast. The expedition was severely affected by dysentery and fever, but sailed from Timor on 13 November 1801, back down the north-west and west coast, then across the Great Australian Bight, reaching Tasmania on 13 January 1802. They charted the whole length of Tasmania's east coast and there were extensive interactions with the Indigenous Tasmanians, with whom they had peaceful relationships. They notably produced precious ethnological studies of Indigenous Tasmanians.

The expedition then began surveying the south coast of Australia, but then Captain Jacques Félix Emmanuel Hamelin in Naturaliste decided to make for Port Jackson (Sydney) as he was running short of food and water, and in need of anchors. En route, in April 1802, Hamelin explored the area of Western Port, Victoria, and gave names to places, a number of which have survived, for example, Île des Français is now called French Island.

Meanwhile, Baudin in Géographe continued westward, and in April 1802 encountered the British sloop HMS Investigator commanded by Matthew Flinders, also engaged in charting the coastline, at Encounter Bay in what is now South Australia. Flinders informed Baudin of his discovery of Kangaroo Island (Kaurna: Karta Pintingga, lit. 'Island of the Dead'), St. Vincent's and Spencer's Gulfs. Baudin sailed on to the Nuyts Archipelago, the point reached by the Dutch ship 't Gulden Zeepaert in 1627, before heading for Port Jackson as well for supplies.

In late 1802 the expedition was at Port Jackson, where the government sold 60 casks of flour and 25 casks of salt meat to Baudin to resupply his two vessels. The supplies permitted Naturaliste to return to France and Géographe to continue her explorations of the Australian coast. The expedition reported on the defences of the town and the disaffection of Irish convicts. Naturaliste took with her the Colony's staff surgeon, Mr. James Thomson, whom Governor Philip Gidley King had given permission to return to England.

Before resuming the voyage Baudin purchased a 30 ton schooner, which he named the Casuarina, a smaller vessel which could conduct close inshore survey work. He sent the larger Naturaliste under Hamelin back to France with all the specimens that had been collected by Baudin and his crew. As the voyage had progressed Louis de Freycinet, now a Lieutenant, had shown his talents as an officer and a hydrographer and so was given command of Casuarina. The expedition then headed for Tasmania and conducted further charting of Bass Strait before sailing west, following the west coast northward, and after another visit to Timor, undertook further exploration along the north coast of Australia. Plagued by contrary winds, ill health, and because 'the quadrupeds and emus were very sick', it was decided on 7 July 1803 to return to France. On the return voyage, the ships stopped in Mauritius, where Baudin died of tuberculosis on 16 September 1803. The expedition finally reached France on 24 March 1804.

The scientific expedition was considered a great success, with more than 2500 new species discovered.

=== Outcomes ===
Memorial rock marking the place where Baudin came ashore at Penneshaw on Kangaroo Island in 1803

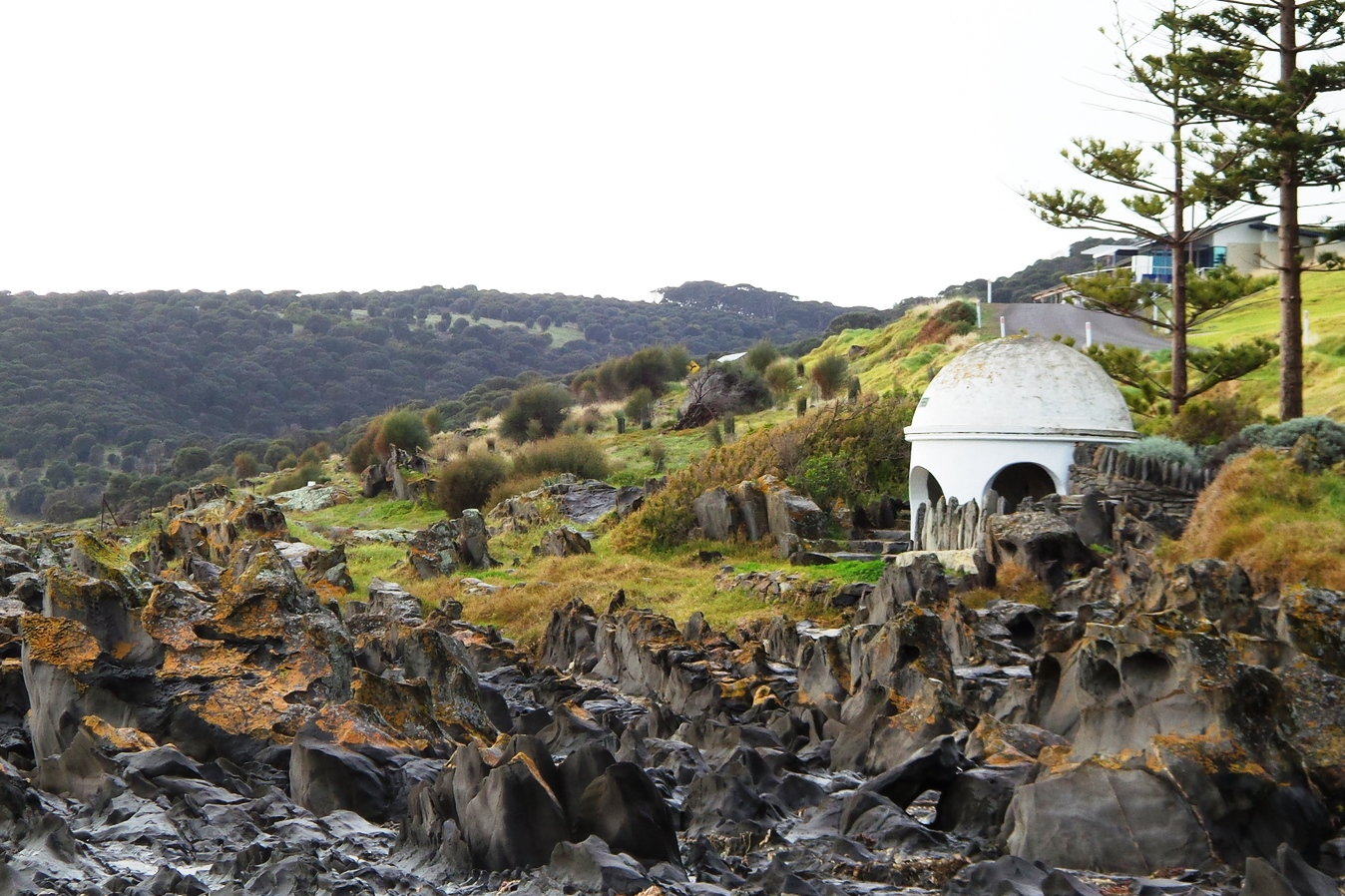
Frenchman's Rock, Penneshaw, Kangaroo Island

An inscription on a rock was left by members of Géographe on Kangaroo Island in 1803, which reads, "Expédition de découverte par le commendant Baudin sur le Géographe, 1803", i.e. "Expedition of discovery by Captain Baudin in the Géographe, 1803". To protect it from erosion, the original rock is now housed at the Gateway Visitor Information Centre on Howard Drive, Penneshaw, and a fine replica is on open view on the Penneshaw foreshore, beneath a concrete dome which has been a local landmark since 1906.

Geographical features of South Australia which were named by Baudin
Name	Location	K.I.	Remarks
Cape Adieu	32°00′S 132°15′E		Here Baudin left South Australia to return to Port Jackson
D'Anville Bay	34°55′S 135°37′E		Jean Baptiste Bourguignon d'Anville, geographer
Cape Beaufort	32°10′S 133°33′E		perhaps Louis Joseph, Duke of Vendôme, Duke of Beaufort
Cape Bedout	35°56′S 136°36′E	#	Jacques Bedout, Napoleonic naval hero, rear admiral
Cape Borda	35°45′S 136°35′E	#	Jean-Charles de Borda, recently deceased mathematician and mariner, constructor of the standard metre
Cape Bouguer	36°3′S 136°54′E	#	Pierre Bouguer, astronomer and mathematician, "the father of naval architecture"
Cape Buffon	37°34′S 140°7′E	#	Georges-Louis Leclerc, Comte de Buffon, naturalist
Cape Carnot	34°57′S 135°38′E	#	Lazare Carnot, engineer and mathematician, member of the Committee of Public Safety
Carpenter Rocks	37°55′S 140°24′E	#	named "Les Carpentiers", perhaps for their sawtooth appearance
Cape Cassini	35°36′S 137°26′E	#	César-François Cassini de Thury, cartographer (or another of his family)
Casuarina Islets	36°5′S 136°41′E	#	schooner Casuarina commanded by Louis de Freycinet
Corvisart Bay	32°50′S 134°8′E	#	Jean-Nicolas Corvisart, physician to Napoléon Bonaparte
Cape du Couedic	36°4′S 136°42′E	#	Charles Louis Chevalier du Couëdic de Kergoualer (1740–1780), commander of frigate La Surveilante
Decres Bay	32°14′S 133°44′E		Denis Decrès, naval officer, Napoleon's Minister of the Navy
Cape Dombey	37°10′S 139°45′E		Joseph Dombey, French naturalist of the Americas whose plant collections are currently owned by the British Museum
Cape D'Estaing			Charles Hector, comte d'Estaing, admiral, executed during the Reign of Terror
D'Estrees Bay	35°57′S 137°35′E	#	Victor-Marie d'Estrées, admiral who fought in battles of the late 17th century
Cape D'Estrees	32°16′S 133°46′E		(ditto)
Cape Euler			Leonhard Euler, prolific 18th century Swiss mathematician, founder of the Euler diagram (a diagrammatic means of representing sets and their relationships)
Fenelon Island			François Fénelon, novelist, author of The Adventures of Telemachus; archbishop
Fleurieu Peninsula	35°30′S 138°26′E	#	Charles Pierre Claret de Fleurieu, Minister of the Navy under Louis XVI, Napoleonic Minister Plenipotentiary and member of the Council of State
Cape Forbin	35°42′S 136°47′E	#	Claude de Forbin, late 17th and early 18th century admiral, governor of Bangkok
Cape Gantheaume	36°4′S 137°28′E	#	Honoré Joseph Antoine Ganteaume, naval officer, president the Navy section of the Council of State
Guichen Bay	37°7′S 139°46′E	#	Luc Urbain de Bouëxic, comte de Guichen, French admiral of the American War of Independence
Cape Jaffa	36°57′S 139°40′E	#	Jaffa, port taken by Napoleon in March 1799 during the Egypt Campaign
Jussieu Bay			Antoine Laurent de Jussieu, botanist
Cape Kersaint	36°2′S 137°8′E	#	Armand de Kersaint, rear admiral during the French Revolution, executed during the purge of the Girondins
Lacepede Bay	36°49′S 139°48′E	#	Bernard Germain de Lacépède, naturalist, collaborator of Buffon, author of a Histoire naturelle des poissons
Cape Lannes	37°11′S 139°45′E		Jean Lannes, a Marshal of the Empire
Cape Linois	35°59′S 137°37′E	#	Charles-Alexandre Léon Durand Linois, a French admiral who commanded the Franco-Spanish forces during the Algeciras campaign
Massena Bay			André Masséna, a Marshal of the Empire
Massillon Island			Jean Baptiste Massillon, bishop, famous for his funeral oration for Louis XIV and benign temperament
Maupertuis Bay	36°00′S 136°40′E	#	Pierre Louis Maupertuis, early 18th century mathematician, credited with having invented the principle of least action, a version known as Maupertuis's principle
Cape Missiessy			Édouard Thomas Burgues de Missiessy, admiral
Murat Bay	32°07′S 133°36′E	#	Joachim Murat, a Marshal of the Empire
Cape Rabelais	37°19′S 139°51′E		François Rabelais, 15th century author of Gargantua and Pantagruel
Ravine des Casoars	35°48′S 136°35′E	#	casoar = cassowary, here referring to emus
Rivoli Bay	37°31′S 140°4′E	#	André Masséna, Duke of Rivoli and Marshal of the Empire
Cape Rouge		#	for red granite found nearby
Cape Thevenard	32°09′S 133°39′E	#	Antoine-Jean-Marie Thévenard, admiral
Cape Tournefort	34°55′S 135°52′E		Joseph Pitton de Tournefort, botanist
Tourville Bay	32°09′S 133°29′E	#	Anne Hilarion de Tourville, naval commander victor at the Battle of Lagos (1693)
Vivonne Bay	35°59′S 137°11′E	#	Louis Victor de Rochechouart de Mortemart, Maréchal de Vivonne, 17th century military officer
Cape Vivonne	32°12′S 133°41′E		(ditto)

Many Western Australian places still have French names today from Baudin's expedition: for example, Peron Peninsula, Depuch Island, Cape Levillain, Boullanger Island and Faure Island; and the Australian plant genus Guichenotia honours the name of Antoine Guichenot.

According to researchers from the University of Adelaide, during this expedition Baudin prepared a report for Napoleon on ways to invade and capture the British colony at Sydney Cove. The Baudin expedition was intended to be a voyage of discovery that would further scientific knowledge and perhaps eclipse the achievements of Captain James Cook.

== Crew ==
Among those joining the Baudin expedition were Sub-lieutenants Louis-Claude (Louis) de Saulses de Freycinet and his older brother Henri-Louis (Henri). Louis did not initially sail as a 'geographer'. Both were eventually promoted to Lieutenant, and Louis was later given command of the schooner Casuarina, purchased in Sydney to enable improved inshore surveying. Another member of the expedition, someone who was ultimately to have a highly significant influence on its outcomes, was the 25-year-old assistant zoologist François Péron.

=== Officers and sailors ===
Captains: Nicolas Thomas Baudin (1754–1803) (Géographe) and Jacques Félix Emmanuel Hamelin (1768–1839) (Naturaliste).

Surgeon-Physician and naturalist: Pierre François Keraudren (1769–1858) (Le Géographe)(Preparations not on board)

Sub-lieutenants Louis de Freycinet and, his older brother, Henri-Louis de Freycinet

Sailors: Hyacinthe de Bougainville, midshipman second-class, and François-Antoine Boniface Heirisson, midshipman; Charles Baudin, midshipman. Jacques-Philippe Mérigon de Montgéry was a 2nd class midshipman aboard Géographe and landed sick at Île-de-France on 25 April 1801.

=== Scientists and artists ===
A total of 24 various scientists and artists including five gardeners accompanied Baudin on the expedition. It was an unprecedented number to be assembled for a voyage at the time. However, after only six months at sea, and before reaching Australia, ten of the group were disembarked at Mauritius mainly due to illness. Subsequently, five others died. In fact, only six of the original group of scientists and artists would complete the journey home.

Scientists and Artists on board le Géographe and le Naturaliste
Name	Profession	Remarks
Bailly, Charles	Zoologist	
Bernier, Pierre-François	Astronomer	Died at sea, 6 June 1803
Bissy, Frédéric	Astronomer	Left ship at Mauritius due to illness, 25 April 1801
Boullanger, Charles-Pierre	Hydrographer	
Caguet, François	Gardener	Disembarked at Mauritius, 20 April 1801
Delisse, Jacques	Botanist	Left ship at Mauritius due to illness, 25 April 1801
Depuch, Louis	Mineralogist	Left ship at Mauritius due to illness, 3 February 1803, where he died some days later
Dumont, Désiré	Zoologist	Left ship at Mauritius due to illness, 25 April 1801
Faure, Pierre	Geographer	Disembarked at Mauritius, 15 December 1803
Garnier, Michel	Painter (de genre)	Left ship at Mauritius due to illness, 25 April 1801
Guichenot, Antoine	Gardener	
La Tour, Jean-Baptiste Leschenault de	Botanist	Left ship at Timor due to illness, 2 June 1803
Lebrun, Louis	Technical draughtsman (Dessinateur-architecte)	Left ship at Mauritius due to illness, 25 April 1801
Lesueur, Charles-Alexandre	Painter (natural history)	
Levillain, Stanislas	Zoologist	Died at sea, 29 December 1801
Maugé, René	Zoologist	Died at Maria Island, 21 February 1802
Merlot	Gardener	Disembarked at Mauritius, 20 April 1801
Michaux, André	Botanist	Disembarked at Mauritius, 20 April 1801
Milbert, Jacques	Painter (landscape)	Left ship at Mauritius due to illness, 25 April 1801
Péron, François	Zoologist	
Petit, Nicolas-Martin	Painter (de genre)	
Riedlé, Anselme	Gardener (Chief)	Died at Timor, 21 October 1801
Saint-Vincent, Bory de	Zoologist	Left ship at Mauritius due to illness, 25 April 1801
Sautier, Antoine	Gardener	Died at sea, 15 November 1801

== Publications ==
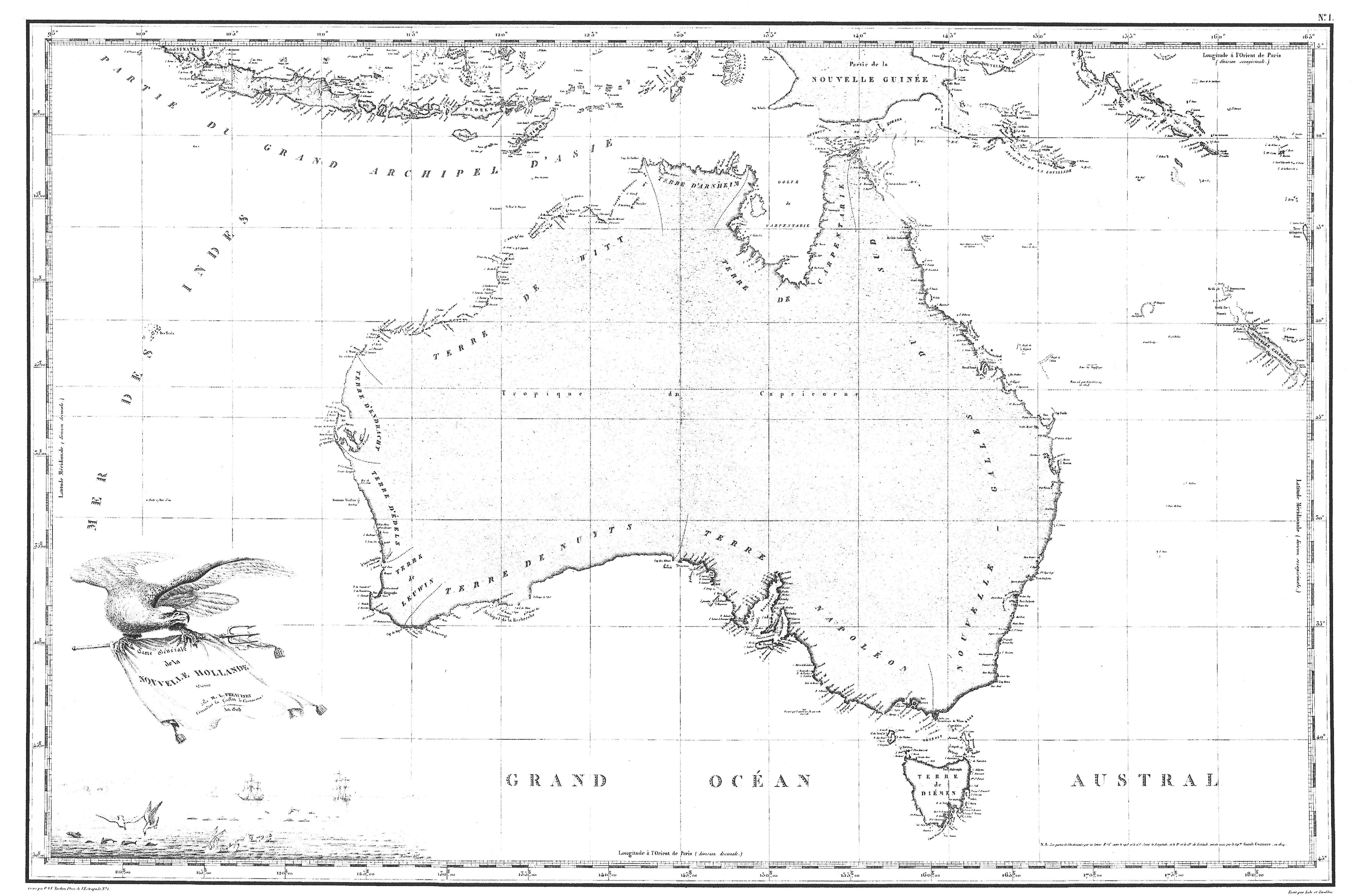
The Freycinet Map of 1811 – The first full map of Australia to be published

- F. Péron; Nicolas Baudin; Louis Claude Desaulses de Freycinet; Charles Alexandre Lesueur; Nicolas-Martin Petit. F. Péron (ed.). A Voyage of Discovery to the Southern Hemisphere: Performed by Order of the Emperor Napoleon during the Years 1801, 1802, and 1804 (in French). Illustrator: Charles Alexandre Lesueur. doi:10.5962/BHL.TITLE.44096. LCCN 04032253. OCLC 7403322. Wikidata Q3563344. This work has the Freycinet Map of 1811, the first published map showing the full outline of Australia.
- Louis Pierre Vieillot, Nouveau dictionnaire d'histoire naturelle ('New Dictionary of Natural History', 1816–1819): new bird species described

== Collections ==
Over 200,000 specimens from the expedition were deposited in Muséum national d'histoire naturelle (zoology) and Jardin des Plantes (botany). Live plants, animals and birds were also sent to Empress Josephine Bonaparte's gardens at the Château de Malmaison.

== See also ==
- European exploration of Australia
- Freycinet Map of 1811
- History of Australia (1788–1850)
