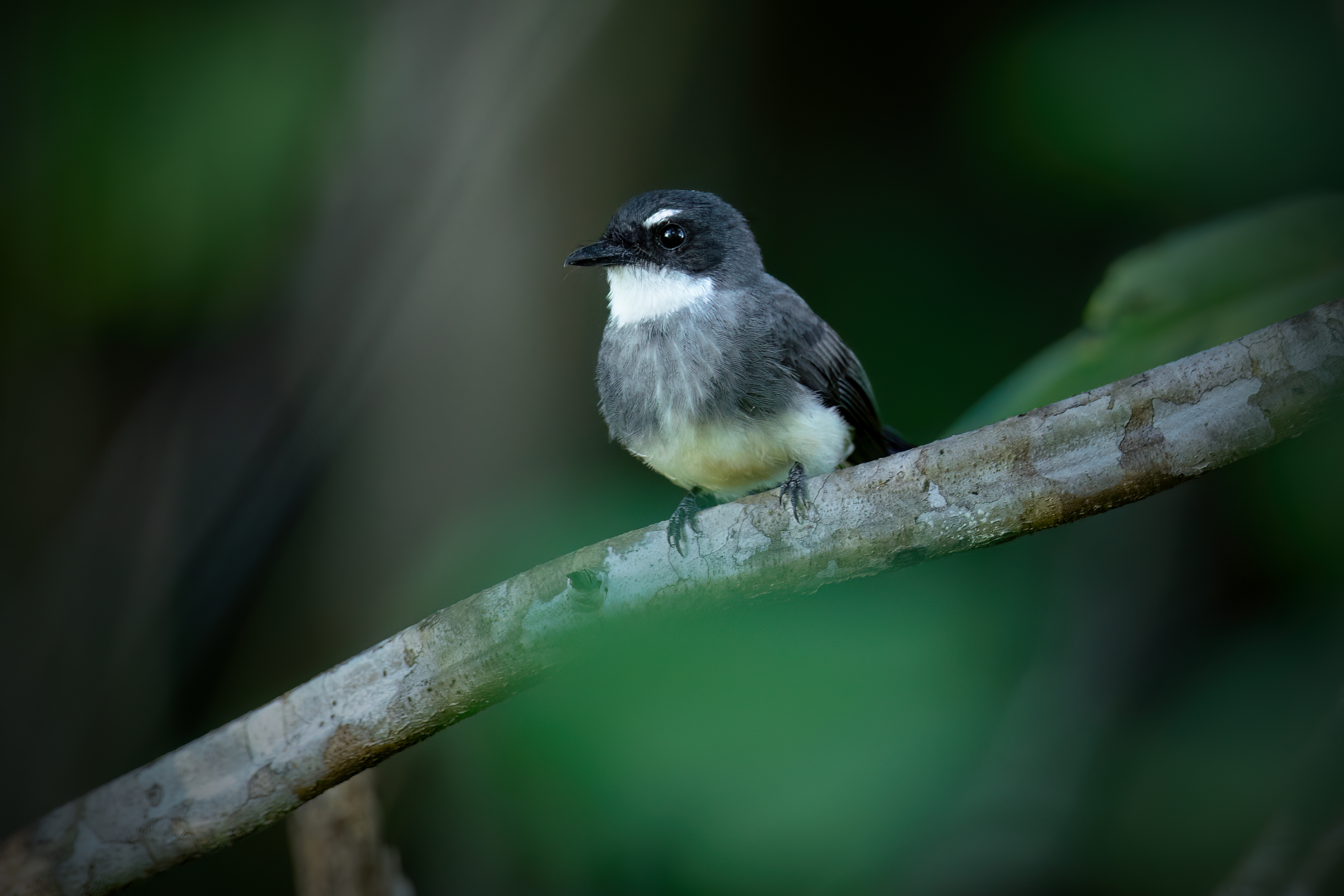

Conservation status
- Least Concern (IUCN 3.1)

Scientific classification
- Kingdom: Animalia
- Phylum: Chordata
- Class: Aves
- Order: Passeriformes
- Family: Rhipiduridae
- Genus: Rhipidura
- Species: R. rufiventris

Binomial name
- Rhipidura rufiventris (Vieillot, 1818)
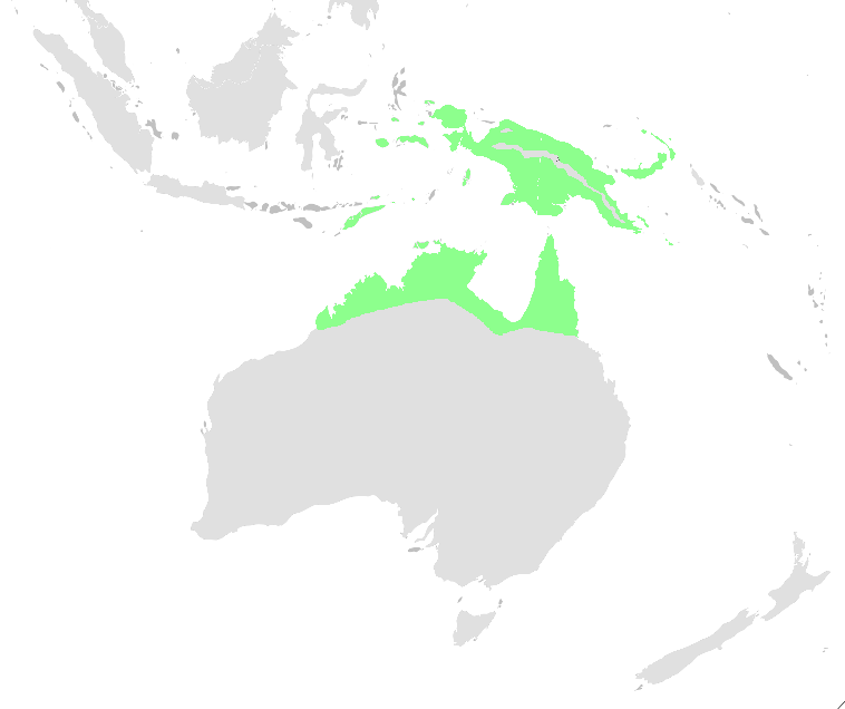

= Northern fantail =

Species of bird

The northern fantail (Rhipidura rufiventris) is a species of bird in the family Rhipiduridae. It is found in New Guinea, Timor, and northern Australia (from Broome in Western Australia to the Shire of Burdekin in Queensland). Its natural habitats are subtropical or tropical moist lowland forests and subtropical or tropical mangrove forests.

== Taxonomy ==
The northern fantail was formally described in 1818 as Platyrhynchos rufiventris by the French ornithologist Louis Vieillot. The specific epithet is Modern Latin meaning "red-bellied" from Latin rufus meaning "ruddy" or "rufous" with venter, ventris meaning "belly". Vieillot mistakenly believed that the specimen had been collected in "Nouvelle-Hollande" (Australia). The type locality has been designated as the island of Timor. The specimen described by Vieillot had probably been collected in 1801 by René Maugé de Cely during the Baudin expedition to Australia. The northern fantail is now placed in the genus Rhipidura that was introduced in 1827 by Nicholas Vigors and Thomas Horsfield.

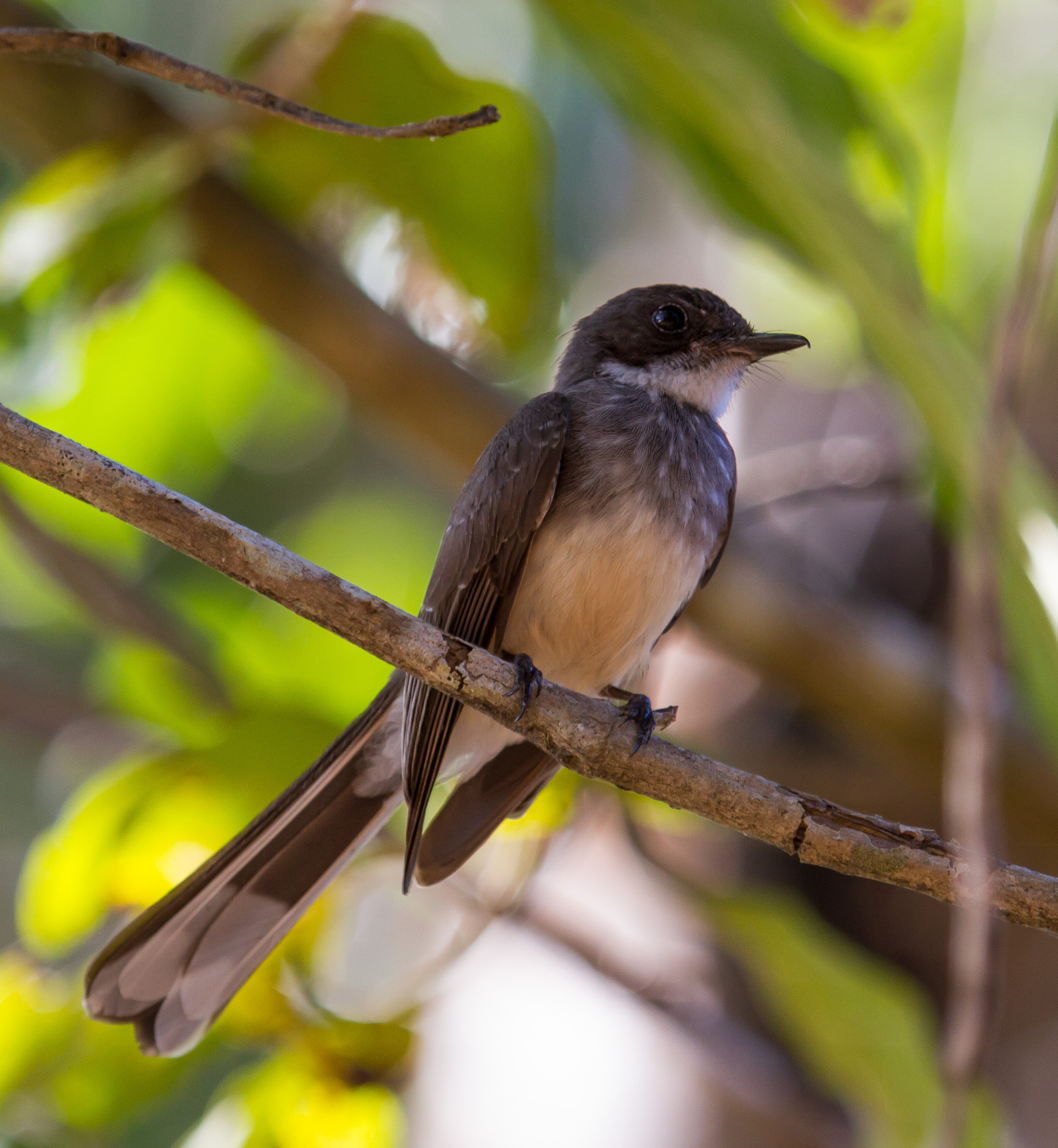
Fogg Dam, Middle Point, Northern Territory, Australia

Twenty subspecies are recognised:

- R. r. tenkatei Büttikofer, J, 1892 – Rote Island (eastern Lesser Sunda Islands)
- R. r. rufiventris (Vieillot, LJP, 1818) – eastern Lesser Sunda Islands (Semau, Timor, and Jaco Island)
- R. r. pallidiceps Hartert, EJO, 1904 – Wetar (eastern Lesser Sunda Islands)
- R. r. hoedti Büttikofer, J, 1892 – eastern Lesser Sunda Islands (Sermata, Moa, Leti, Romang, and Damar Island)
- R. r. assimilis Gray, GR, 1858 – Tayandu and Kai islands, southern Moluccas
- R. r. finitima Hartert, EJO, 1918 – Watubela Islands, southern Moluccas
- R. r. bouruensis Wallace, AR, 1863 – Buru Island (southern Moluccas)
- R. r. cinerea Wallace, AR, 1865 – southern Moluccas (Seram, Ambon, and Boana)
- R. r. obiensis Salvadori, AT, 1876 – Obi Island (northern Moluccas)
- R. r. vidua Salvadori, AT & Turati, E, 1874 – Kofiau (Raja Ampat Islands, off western New Guinea)
- R. r. gularis Müller, S, 1843 – New Guinea, including Yapen (Cenderawasih Bay, off northwestern New Guinea) and northern Torres Strait Islands (Boigu Island)
- R. r. nigromentalis Hartert, EJO, 1898 – Misima and Tagula Island (Louisiade Archipelago, off southeastern New Guinea)
- R. r. finschii Salvadori, AT, 1882 – New Britain and Duke of York (southeastern Bismarck Archipelago)
- R. r. setosa (Quoy, JRC & Gaimard, JP, 1832) – New Hanover, Dyaul Island, and New Ireland (northeastern Bismarck Archipelago)
- R. r. gigantea Stresemann, EFT, 1933 – Bismarck Archipelago (Lihir Island and Tabar Groups)
- R. r. tangensis Mayr, E, 1955 – Bismarck Archipelago (Boang and Tanga Islands)
- R. r. niveiventris Rothschild, LW & Hartert, EJO, 1914 – Admiralty Islands
- R. r. mussai Rothschild, LW & Hartert, EJO, 1924 – Mussau Island, in St. Matthias Group (north-central Bismarck Archipelago)
- R. r. isura Gould, J, 1841 – northern Australia (Kimberley region, northern Western Australia to Cape York Peninsula and Wet Tropics region, northern Queensland)
- R. r. kordensis Meyer, AB, 1874 – Biak (Cenderawasih Bay, off northwestern New Guinea)

The subspecies R. r. kordensis has sometimes been considered as a separate species, the Biak fantail.
