= Charles-Pierre Boullanger =

French geographer (1772–1813)

Charles-Pierre Boullanger (1772–1813) was a French geographer who served on Nicolas Baudin's scientific expedition to the South Pacific and its islands from 1800 to 1803. He was a midshipman cartographer and hydrographic engineer on the survey vessel Le Géographe with the sister ship Naturaliste. During this expedition he produced, with Charles-Alexandre Lesueur, a detailed map of the east coast of Australia.

Boullanger led a small group sent by Nicolas Baudin to Maria Island off the east Tasmanian coast on 19 February 1802.

== Honours ==
Geographic features names in Boullanger's honour:

- Cape Boullanger — the north end of Maria Island.
- Cape Boullanger — the northern tip of Dorre Island in the present-day Shark Bay nature reserve off the coast of Western Australia.
- Cape Boullanger as the southernmost tip of Rottnest Island off Western Australia.
- Boullanger Island — off Jurien Bay, Western Australia.

== See also ==
- Boullanger Island
