= Depuch Island =

Island in Western Australia

- Location within Western Australia

Geography
- Location: Indian Ocean
- Coordinates: 20°37′54″S 117°43′27″E

Administration
- Australia
- State: Western Australia
- LGA: City of Karratha

Depuch Island (or Warmalana) is a volcanic island located off the north-west coast of Western Australia's Pilbara region, near Port Hedland.

== Aboriginal significance ==
The island is of cultural importance to the Ngaluma Aboriginal people, who know it as Warmalana. According to Ngaluma legend, the island was formed during the Dreaming when Matalga, a leading Pilbara spirit man, lifted a large rock and threw it into the sea. The rocks and boulders of the island are covered with Aboriginal engravings and rock art.

== European exploration ==
The island was charted in July 1801 by François-Michel Ronsard, the cartographer on a French expedition led by explorer Nicolas Baudin on board the ship Géographe. The island was named Ile Depuch after Louis Depuch, a mineralogist on Baudin's expedition. After a visit to the island, Ronsard established that it was volcanic, and was the first evidence of volcanic activity on the Australian continent the expedition had discovered.

In 1912, a Norwegian steel sailing ship, Crown of England, was shipwrecked as it lay anchored on the island loading copper ore, after the area was struck by a cyclone. Many other ships were sunk in the area, such as the passenger liner SS Koombana. The newly built tug SS Wyola sailing for Fremantle was despatched to rescue the barque Concordia which was left grounded by the storm.

== Recent activity ==
The discovery of iron ore deposits in the Pilbara region during the early 1960s saw Depuch Island considered for use as a port for the mining facilities being established in the area. In 1962, however, a survey by the Western Australian Museum discovered thousands of Aboriginal engravings, and the port was moved to the Dampier Archipelago.
