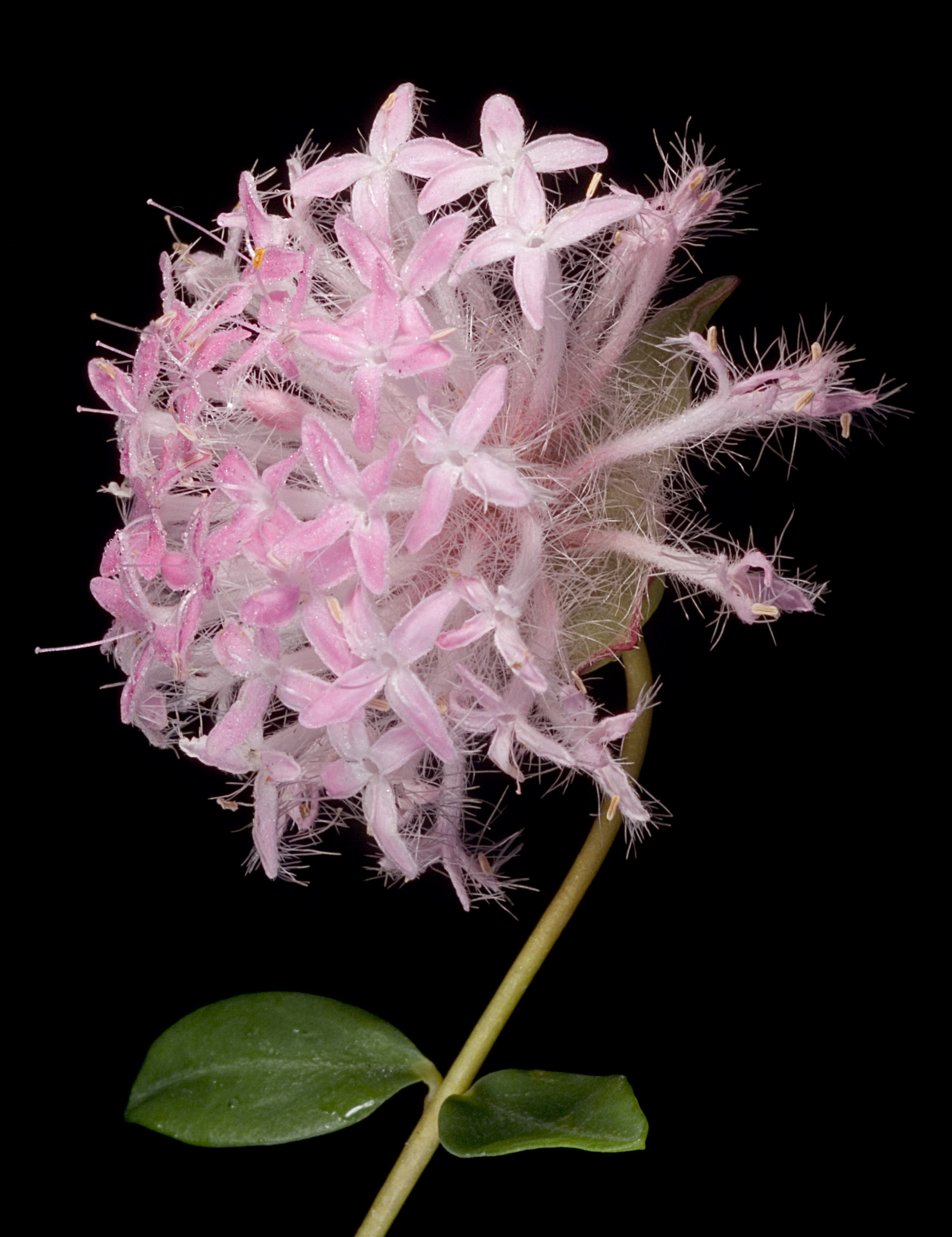

Scientific classification
- Kingdom: Plantae
- Clade: Tracheophytes
- Clade: Angiosperms
- Clade: Eudicots
- Clade: Rosids
- Order: Malvales
- Family: Thymelaeaceae
- Genus: Pimelea
- Species: P. hispida

Binomial name
- Pimelea hispida R.Br.

Synonyms
- Banksia hispida (R.Br.) Kuntze; Heterolaena hispida (R.Br.) C.A.Mey.; Pimelea hispida R.Br. var. hispida

= Pimelea hispida =

Species of shrub

Pimelea hispida, commonly known as bristly pimelea, is a species of flowering plant in the family Thymelaeaceae and is endemic to the southwest of Western Australia. It is an erect shrub with elliptic leaves and erect clusters of pink flowers surrounded by 4 green involucral bracts.

== Description ==
Pimelea hispida is a shrub that typically grows to a height of 0.2–1.5 m (7.9 in – 4 ft 11.1 in) with a single stem at ground level. The leaves are elliptic, 9–29 mm (0.35–1.14 in) long, 2–9 mm (0.079–0.354 in) wide on a petiole 1–2 mm (0.039–0.079 in) long. The flowers are pink, arranged in clusters on an erect peduncle 5–40 mm (0.20–1.57 in) long, each flower on a pedicel 0.4–1 mm (0.016–0.039 in) long. The clusters are surrounded by 4 involucral bracts that are 9–20 mm (0.35–0.79 in) long and 7–20 mm (0.28–0.79 in) wide and green with pink or yellow parts. The flower tube is 11–16 mm (0.43–0.63 in) long, the sepals 2.5–5 mm (0.098–0.197 in) long, and the stamens are usually longer than the sepals. Flowering occurs from September to December.

== Taxonomy ==
Pimelea hispida was first formally described in 1810 by Robert Brown in his book Prodromus Florae Novae Hollandiae et Insulae Van Diemen. The specific epithet (hispida) means "with bristly hairs", referring to the flowers.

== Distribution and habitat ==
Bristly pimelea grows on winter-wet flats and on coastal sand hills and is found from Geographe Bay to Albany and in the Stirling Range, in the Esperance Plains, Jarrah Forest, Swan Coastal Plain and Warren bioregions of south-western Western Australia.

== Conservation status ==
This pimelea is list as "not threatened" by the Western Australian Government Department of Biodiversity, Conservation and Attractions.
