= Boullanger Island =

Island of Western Australia

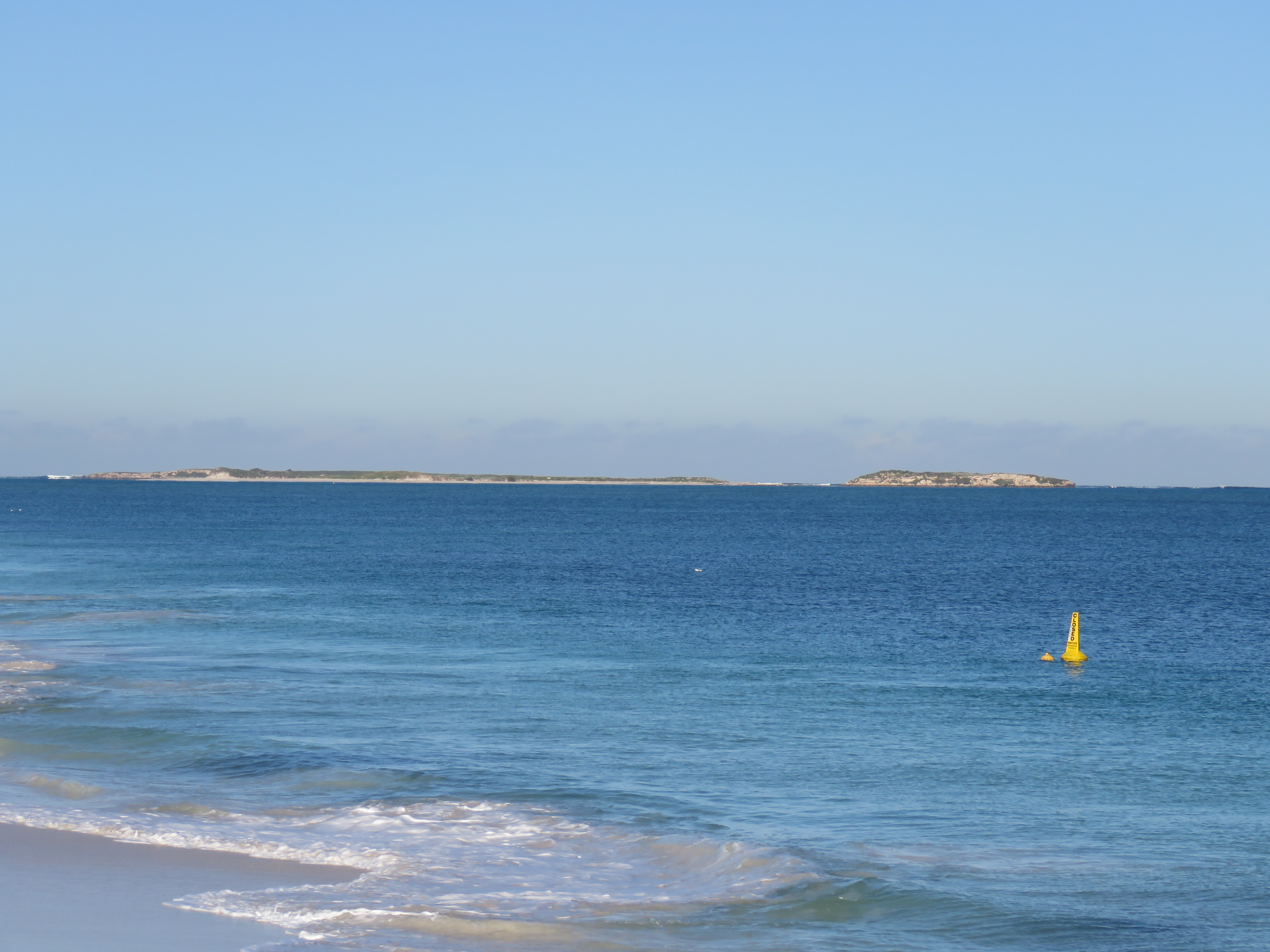
- Boullanger Island seen from Jurien Bay

Geography
- Location: Indian Ocean
- Coordinates: 30°18′55″S 115°00′13″E

Administration
- Australia
- State: Western Australia
- LGA: Shire of Dandaragan

Boullanger Island lies off the coast of Western Australia and covers an area of about 35 hectares (86 acres). The nearest settlement is the mainland town of Jurien Bay. It is located within the Jurien Bay Marine Park and part of the Boullanger, Whitlock, Favourite, Tern and Osprey Islands Nature Reserve.

== Description ==
The island is part of the Jurien Bay Marine Park which was declared in August 2003 – the park is located 200 to 300 kilometres (120–190 miles) north of Perth, along the Indian Ocean Drive, and extends south from Green Head to the Southern boundary of Nambung National Park, encompassing many of the islands located in this region. The Park protects an important section of Western Australia's central west coast, including Boullanger, Whitlock and Escape islands.

Both Boullanger Island and Jurien Bay were named on 1 July 1801 by the French expedition led by Nicolas Baudin aboard Géographe. Boullanger Island honours the cartographer of the expedition, Charles-Pierre Boullanger, and Jurien Bay honours Charles-Marie Jurien, a French naval administrator.

== Fauna and flora ==
The island is inhabited by an endemic species of marsupial mouse, Sminthopsis boullangerensis, the Boullanger Island dunnart. It was formerly considered a subspecies of the grey-bellied dunnart (S. griseoventer), for which reason it was not assessed by the IUCN in 2008 (although it was classed as critically endangered in the 1996 list). The EPBC Act classifies the Boullanger Island dunnart as vulnerable.

== See also ==
- Boullanger Island dunnart
- List of islands of Western Australia
