= Jacques-Philippe Mérigon de Montgéry =

French naval officer

Jacques-Philippe Mérigon de Montgéry (25 July 1781 – 9 September 1839) was a French naval officer and military technologist. He was involved in innovating naval weaponry and defences including anti-ship mines, torpedoes, iron cladding, and rockets.

Montgéry was born in Paris and joined the navy in 1794. He became a midshipman in 1798 and captain in 1828. He served on the expedition of Nicolas Baudin in 1800 and worked aboard gunboats and corvettes including the Enflammée (1803), Émulation (1816–1818), Prudente (1819–1820) and during the Battle of Trafalgar aboard the Hermione. In 1820 he was sent America to examine ports and naval facilities. As a member of the Conseil des Travaux de la Marine from 1830, he examined various weapons including flamethrowers, rocket firing mechanisms, ironclad steam ships, mines, submarines, and torpedoes. He studied the history of rockets from the period of William Congreve in his Traité des fusées de guerre (1825). He wrote a biography of Robert Fulton and examined the works of Hero of Alexandria, the development of cannons, and whaling equipment.

Montgéry was made officer of the Legion of Honor in 1834. He was an official correspondent of the Annales de l’industrie, a member of the American Philosophical Society, Philadelphia and the Imperial Academy of Sciences, Moscow. He died in an asylum with grandiose delusions.
