= Cape Naturaliste =

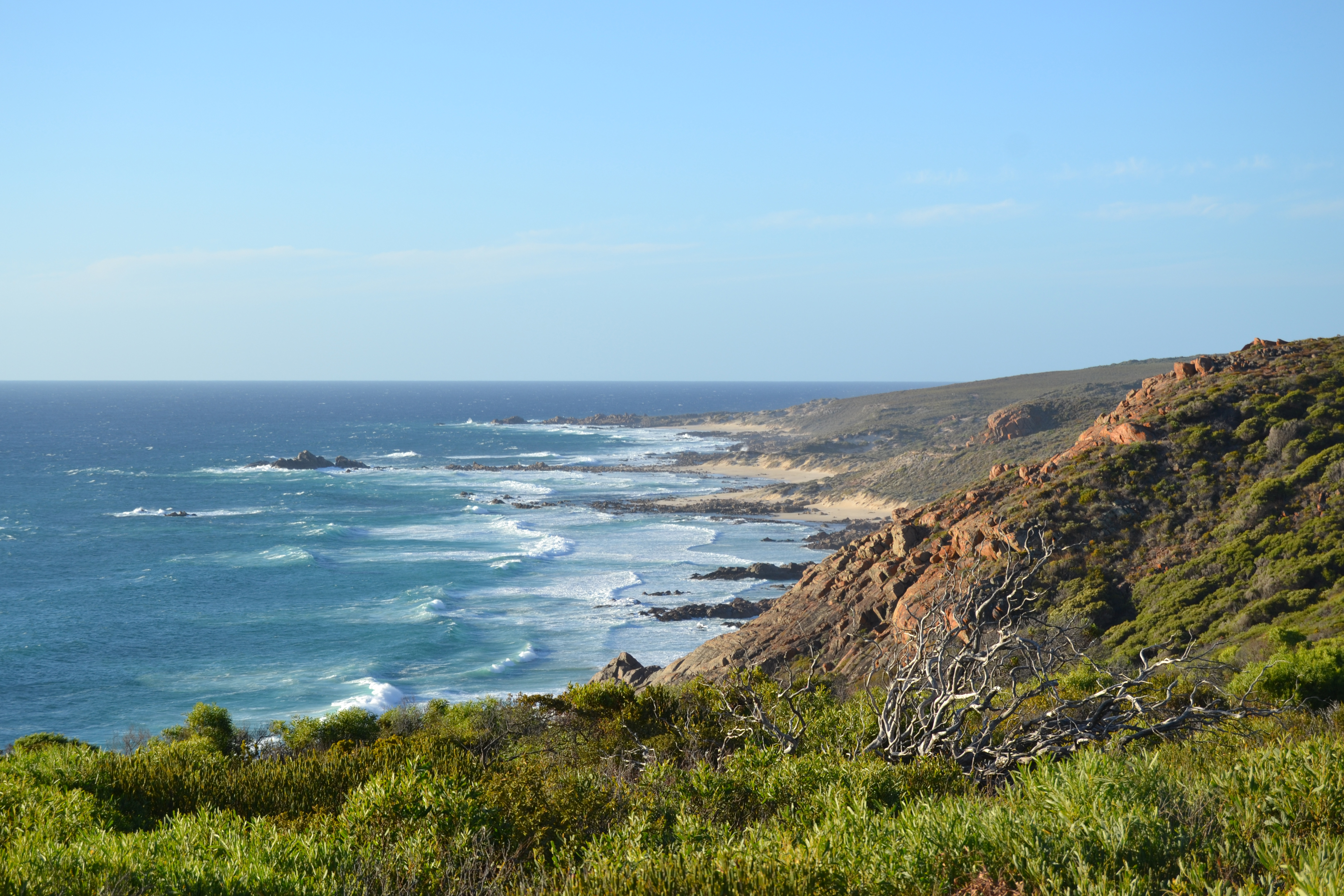
- Cape Naturaliste

- Coordinates: 33°31′49″S 115°00′14″E
- Country: Australia
- State: Western Australia

Cape Naturaliste is a headland in the south western region of Western Australia at the western edge of the Geographe Bay. It is the northernmost point of the Leeuwin-Naturaliste Ridge, which was named after the cape. The Leeuwin-Naturaliste National Park, the Cape Naturaliste Lighthouse and the Cape to Cape hiking track were also named after this location.

== Settlements ==
The nearest settlement is Bunker Bay – a community that evolved from holiday shacks to very expensive housing for wealthy residents as well as featuring a popular beach resort. Further east, across the Bay, is Dunsborough, a much older settlement. Busselton is located still further east from there.

== History ==
The first people in Cape Naturaliste were the Wardandi Aboriginal people, who called it Kwirreejeenungup, meaning "the place with the beautiful view". In 1801, the French navigator Nicolas Baudin stopped here on 30 May during his exploration of Australia. The French were mapping the coast of New Holland. Baudin named the bay they found Geographe Bay, after his flagship, Géographe. Later, the cape was named after the expedition's second ship, Naturaliste.

== Climate ==
Cape Naturaliste has a warm-summer mediterranean climate (Köppen: Csb, with warm, dry summers and mild, wet winters).

Climate data for Cape Naturaliste (33º32'S, 115º01'E, 109 m AMSL) (1903-2024 normals and extremes)
Month	Jan	Feb	Mar	Apr	May	Jun	Jul	Aug	Sep	Oct	Nov	Dec	Year
Record high °C (°F)	40.6 (105.1)	39.4 (102.9)	37.4 (99.3)	34.1 (93.4)	27.8 (82.0)	24.3 (75.7)	22.9 (73.2)	23.6 (74.5)	27.5 (81.5)	31.7 (89.1)	36.7 (98.1)	38.5 (101.3)	40.6 (105.1)
Mean daily maximum °C (°F)	25.6 (78.1)	26.0 (78.8)	24.6 (76.3)	22.0 (71.6)	19.3 (66.7)	17.4 (63.3)	16.4 (61.5)	16.5 (61.7)	17.4 (63.3)	19.0 (66.2)	21.6 (70.9)	23.8 (74.8)	20.8 (69.4)
Mean daily minimum °C (°F)	15.3 (59.5)	15.7 (60.3)	15.1 (59.2)	13.9 (57.0)	12.6 (54.7)	11.5 (52.7)	10.5 (50.9)	10.1 (50.2)	10.4 (50.7)	11.1 (52.0)	12.5 (54.5)	14.0 (57.2)	12.7 (54.9)
Record low °C (°F)	7.8 (46.0)	8.9 (48.0)	6.4 (43.5)	5.1 (41.2)	6.1 (43.0)	4.2 (39.6)	4.1 (39.4)	3.7 (38.7)	3.8 (38.8)	4.6 (40.3)	5.2 (41.4)	7.5 (45.5)	3.7 (38.7)
Average precipitation mm (inches)	10.6 (0.42)	11.7 (0.46)	22.9 (0.90)	44.2 (1.74)	113.6 (4.47)	160.2 (6.31)	158.8 (6.25)	112.2 (4.42)	75.1 (2.96)	48.6 (1.91)	25.4 (1.00)	13.1 (0.52)	793.6 (31.24)
Average precipitation days (≥ 1.0 mm)	1.9	1.9	3.2	6.6	12.9	16.7	18.8	16.4	12.6	8.9	5.0	2.7	107.6
Average afternoon relative humidity (%)	57	56	58	62	69	72	72	70	68	65	61	59	64
Average dew point °C (°F)	14.1 (57.4)	14.4 (57.9)	13.6 (56.5)	12.7 (54.9)	11.8 (53.2)	10.8 (51.4)	9.8 (49.6)	9.5 (49.1)	9.9 (49.8)	10.6 (51.1)	11.9 (53.4)	13.0 (55.4)	11.8 (53.3)
Source: Bureau of Meteorology

== General references ==
- Marchant, Leslie R. French Napoleonic Placenames of the South West Coast, Greenwood, WA. R.I.C. Publications, 2004. ISBN 1-74126-094-9
- Rowlett, Russ. "Lighthouses of Australia: Western Australia". The Lighthouse Directory. University of North Carolina at Chapel Hill.
