= Baudin pig =

Breed of pig

The Baudin Pig is a landrace of domestic pig, originating on Kangaroo Island, South Australia. The landrace descended from pigs released on the island in the 1800s. The entirety of the wild stock of the breed was wiped out during the Kangaroo Island bushfires, and the only remaining examples of the breed are kept at a rare breeds farm on the island.

The breed is named after Nicolas-Thomas Baudin, one of the possible individuals credited with introducing pigs to Kangaroo Island. Westran Pigs are an inbred form of the breed, crossed with large white, which are used in medical research, particularly for xenotransplantation.
