= Decres Bay =

Coordinates: 32°13′S 133°44′E

Decres Bay is a sheltered natural harbor south-east of Ceduna in South Australia. It was used for the export of wheat via transshipping prior to 1914. As of 2018 it features a camping site and is being reconsidered as the site of a potential future port.

== Port Proposals ==
In 1914, Decres Bay was under consideration as an alternative site for the development of a commercial port for the bulk handling of wheat at the terminus of the Minnipa Hill railway. The site was passed over, with insufficient depth of water at the entrance channel cited as a deciding factor. The channel offered a minimum depth of 8.2 metres (27 feet). Despite being more exposed to storms and swell, and requiring ongoing dredging works, the neighboring site at Cape Thevenard was selected in preference. Members of the Murat Bay Vigilance Committee believed that the port proposal was abandoned as a result of prejudice and politics; namely that the two sites represented competing visions of consecutive Labor (Decres Bay) and Liberal (Thevenard) governments. The proposed jetty was to be 1260 feet (384 metres) long and reach into water 30 feet deep (9.1 metres) but was never built.

In February 2018, Decres Bay was named as a site for a prospective new "stand-alone" port.
