= New Holland (Australia) =

Historical name for the island continent of Australia

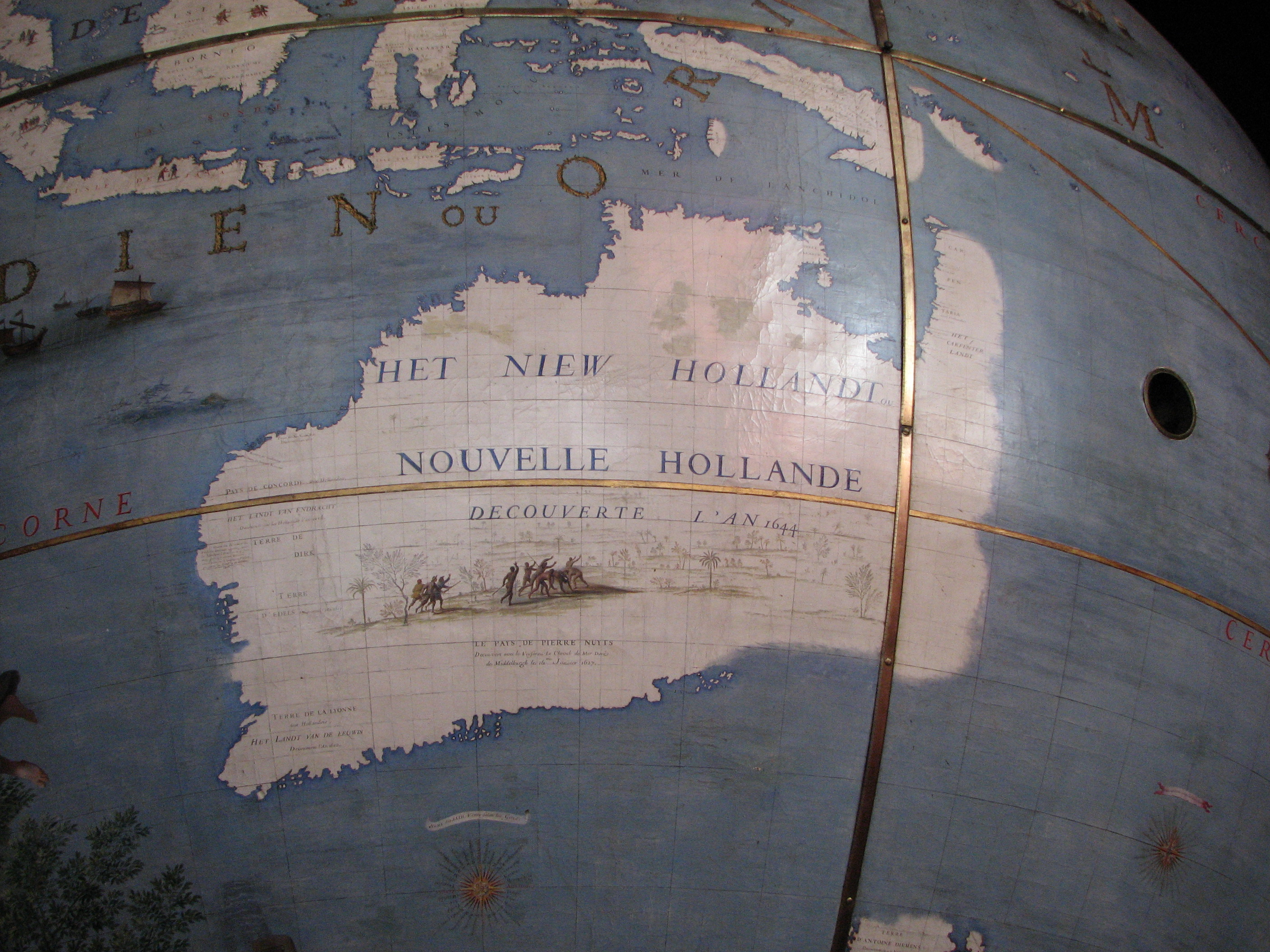
New Holland as mapped on a Coronelli globe commissioned in 1681

New Holland (Dutch: Het Niew Holland or Nieuw-Holland) is a historical European name for mainland Australia, first encountered by Europeans in 1606, by Dutch navigator Willem Janszoon aboard Duyfken. The name was first applied to Australia in 1644 by the Dutch seafarer Abel Tasman, and for a time came to be applied in most European maps to the vaunted "Southern land" or Terra Australis even after its coastline was finally explored.

The continent of Antarctica, later named in the 1890s, was still in largely speculative form; it resumed the name Terra Australis (sometimes suffixed Non Cognita, lit. 'unknown'). Its existence had been speculated on in some maps since the 5th century, under the theory of "balancing hemispheres".

Lieutenant James Cook, during his first voyage of discovery, claimed the eastern portion of the Australian continent for the British Crown in 1770, naming it New South Wales. The British settlement of Sydney as a colony in 1788 prompted Britain to formally claim the east coast as New South Wales, leading to a search for a new collective name. New Holland was never settled by the Dutch people, whose colonial forces and buoyant population had a settled preference for the Dutch Cape Colony, Dutch Guyana, the Dutch East Indies, Dutch Ceylon and the Dutch West Indies.

New Holland continued to be used semi-officially and in popular usage as the name for the whole land mass until at least the mid-1850s.

== History ==
=== Dutch exploration and discovery (c. 1590s–1720s) ===
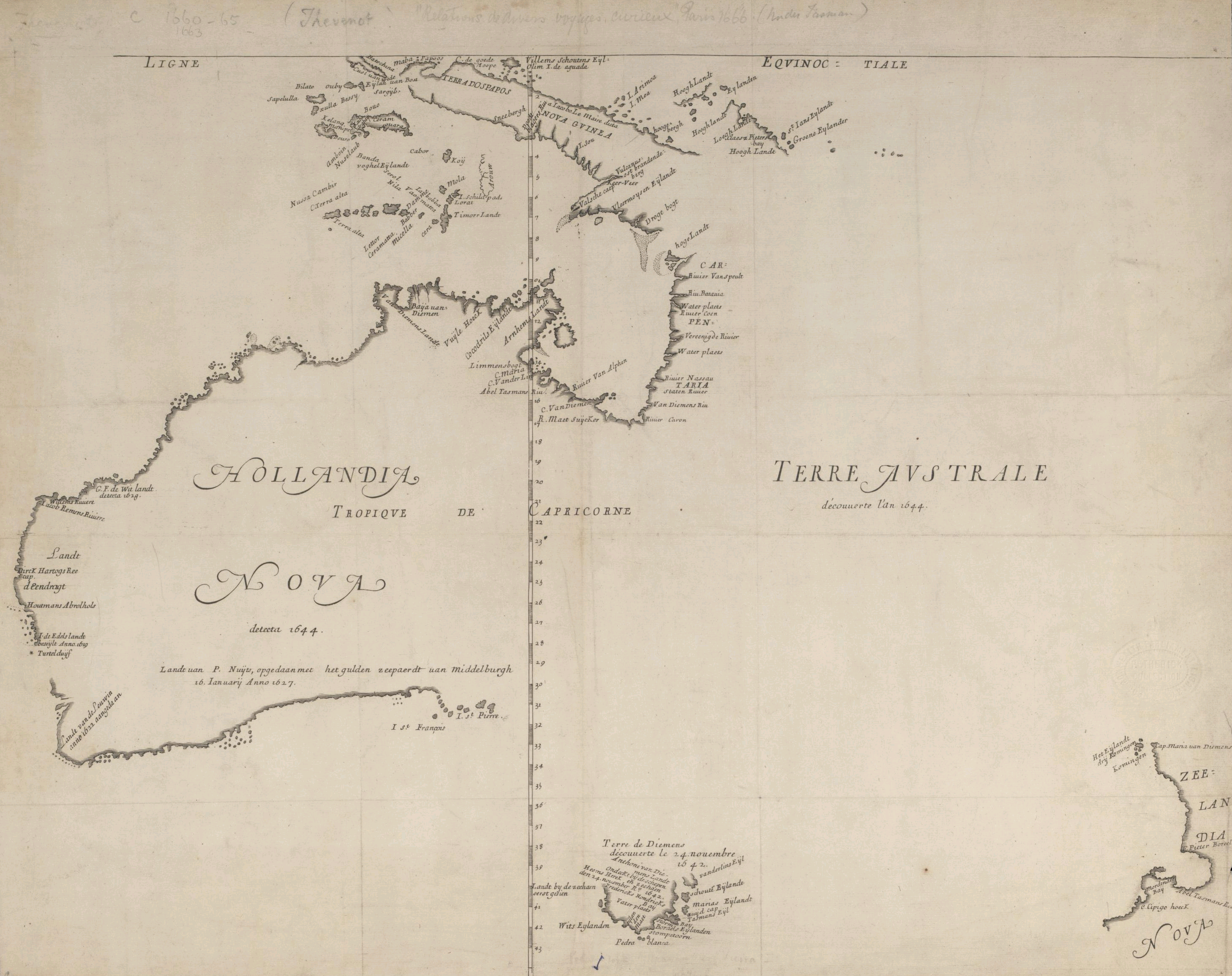
Melchisédech Thévenot (c. 1620 – 1692): 1663 map of "New Holland, discovered in 1644", based on a map by the Dutch cartographer Joan Blaeu.

The name New Holland was first applied to the western and northern coast of Australia in 1644 by the Dutch seafarer Abel Tasman, best known for his discovery of Tasmania (called by him Van Diemen's Land). The English Captain William Dampier used the name in his account of his two voyages there: the first arriving on 5 January 1688 and staying until 12 March; his second voyage of exploration to the region was made in 1699. Except for giving its name to the land, neither the Netherlands nor the Dutch East India Company claimed any territory in Australia as its own. Although many Dutch expeditions visited the coast during the 200 years after the first Dutch visit in 1606, there was no lasting attempt at establishment of a permanent settlement. Most of the explorers of this period concluded that the apparent lack of water and fertile soil made the region unsuitable for colonisation.

=== British colonisation ===
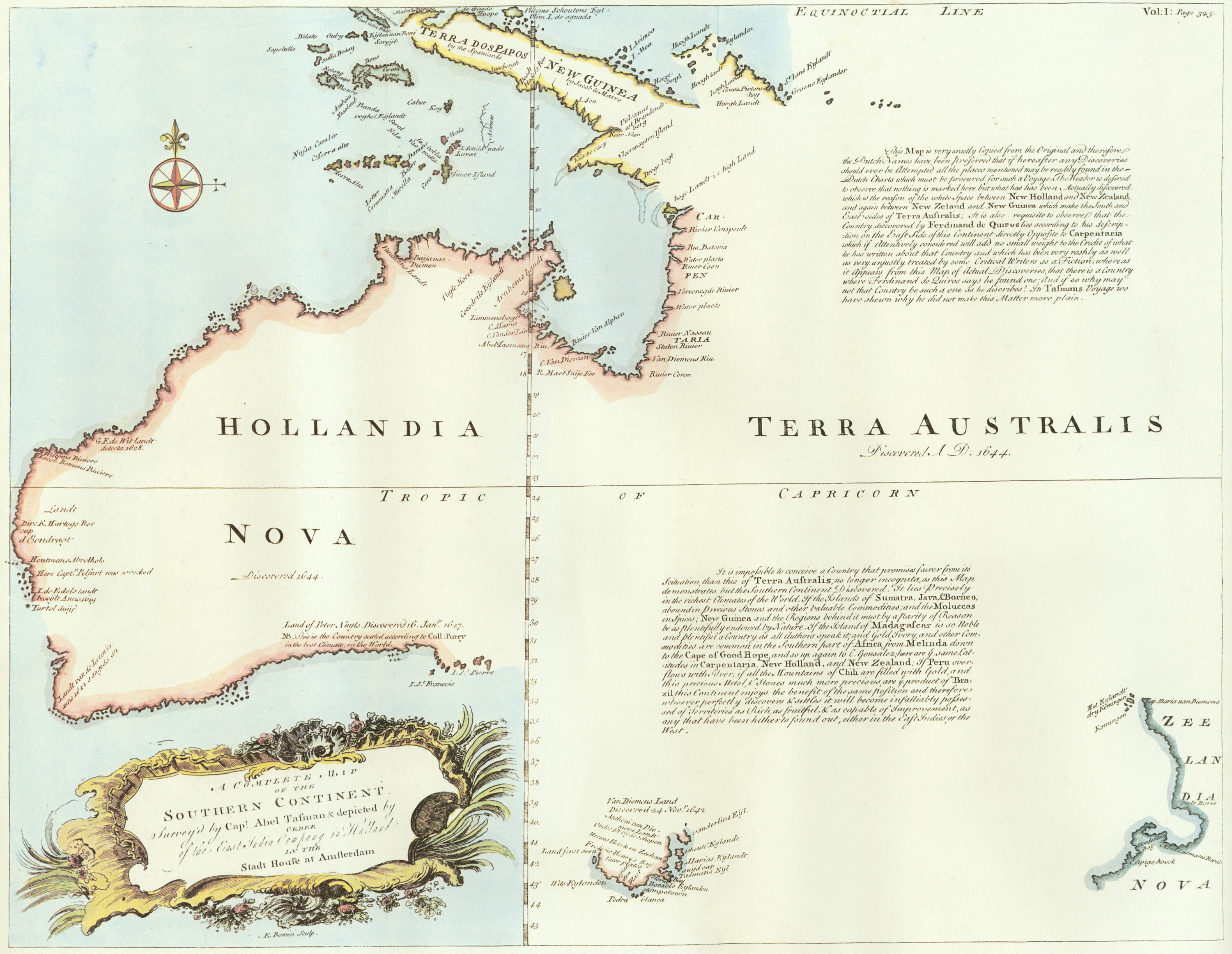
1744 chart of Hollandia Nova – Terra Australis by Emanuel Bowen

On 19 April 1770, during his first voyage of discovery, James Cook became the first recorded European to sight the eastern coast of Australia near Point Hicks, modern Victoria. He sailed north along the coast as far as Cape York where, on 22 August 1770, he claimed "this eastern coast of New Holland" for Great Britain. Cook first named the land New Wales, but revised it to New South Wales. With the establishment of a settlement at Sydney in 1788, Britain solidified its claim to the eastern part of Australia, now officially called New South Wales. In the commission to Governor Phillip the boundary was defined as the 135th meridian east longitude (135° east) (map from 25 April 1787), taking the line from Melchisédech Thévenot's chart, Hollandia Nova—Terre Australe, published in Relations de Divers Voyages Curieux (Paris, 1663).

The term New Holland was more often used to refer only to that part of the continent that had not yet been annexed to New South Wales; namely it referred to the western portion of the continent. In 1804, the British navigator Matthew Flinders proposed the names Terra Australis or Australia for the whole continent, reserving "New Holland" for the western part of the continent. He continued to use Australia in his correspondence, while attempting to gather support for the term. Flinders explained in a letter to Sir Joseph Banks:

The propriety of the name Australia or Terra Australis, which I have applied to the whole body of what has generally been called New Holland, must be submitted to the approbation of the Admiralty and the learned in geography. It seems to me an inconsistent thing that captain Cooks New South Wales should be absorbed in the New Holland of the Dutch, and therefore I have reverted to the original name Terra Australis or the Great South Land, by which it was distinguished even by the Dutch during the 17th century; for it appears that it was not until some time after Tasman's second voyage that the name New Holland was first applied, and then it was long before it displaced T’Zuydt Landt in the charts, and could not extend to what was not yet known to have existence; New South Wales, therefore, ought to remain distinct from New Holland; but as it is requisite that the whole body should have one general name, since it is now known (if there is no great error in the Dutch part) that it is certainly all one land, so I judge, that one less exceptionable to all parties and on all accounts cannot be found than that now applied.

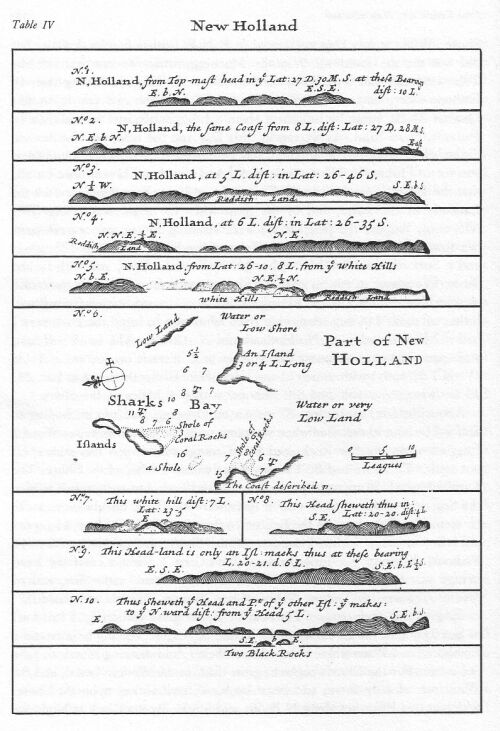
Map of a part of New Holland made by William Dampier in 1699

His suggestion was initially rejected, but the new name was approved by the British government in 1824. The western boundary of New South Wales was changed to 129° east in 1825 (16 July 1825 – map). In 1826, to pre-empt a French settlement and claim to the territory, because of the importance of the route to New South Wales the British established the settlement of Albany in south-west New Holland. Governor Ralph Darling of New South Wales put Edmund Lockyer in command of the expedition and gave him the order that if he encountered the French anywhere he was to land troops, to signify to them that "the whole of New Holland is subject to His Britannic Majesty's Government." In 1828 a further settlement was made, this time on the Swan River, and the name Swan River Colony was soon the term used to refer to the whole western part of the continent. The name New Holland was still invoked as the name for the whole continent when Charles Fremantle on 9 May 1829 took formal possession in the name of King George IV of "all that part of New Holland which is not included within the territory of New South Wales." In 1832, the territory was officially renamed Western Australia.

Even as late as 1837, in official correspondence between the British government in London and New South Wales, the term "New Holland" was still being used to refer to the continent as a whole.

=== French exploration ===
From 1800 to 1803, France conducted an expedition to map the coast of New Holland, led by Nicolas Baudin. The Baudin expedition was intended to be a voyage of discovery that would further scientific knowledge and perhaps eclipse the achievements of James Cook.

Many Western Australian places still have French names today from Baudin's expedition: for example, Peron Peninsula, Depuch Island, Boullanger Island and Faure Island.

== Change of name ==
After British colonisation, the name New Holland was retained for several decades and the south polar continent continued to be called Terra Australis, sometimes shortened to Australia. However, in the 19th century, the colonial authorities gradually removed the Dutch name from the island continent and, instead of inventing a new name, they took the name Australia from the south polar continent, leaving a gap in continental nomenclature for eighty years. Even so, the name New Holland survived for many decades, used in atlases, literature and in common parlance.

In the Netherlands, the continent continued to be called Nieuw Holland until about the end of the 19th century. The Dutch name today is Australië.

One place where the name persists is in taxonomy. Many Australian species named in previous centuries have the specific name novaehollandiae or novae-hollandiae, for example the emu, Dromaius novaehollandiae.

== In literature ==
=== Description ===
Dutch politician and cartographer Nicolaes Witsen describes the south west Australian coast in a detailed description in a letter titled "Some late observations of New Holland" written to English naturalist Martin Lister, dated from 3 October 1698:

On this Voyage nothing hath been discovered which can be any way serviceable to the Company. The Soil of this Country hath been found very barren, and as a Desart; no Fresh-water Rivers have been found, but some Salt-water Rivers, as also no Fourfooted Beasts, except one as great as a Dog, with long Ears, living in the Water as well as on the Land.

Black Swans, Parrots, and many Sea-Cows were found there; as also a Lake, whose Water seemed to be Red, because of the Redness of the Bottom of it: and round along the Shore there was some Salt. Our People had seen but Twelve of the Natives, all as black as Pitch, and stark naked, so terrified, that it was impossible to bring them to Conversation, or a Meeting: They lodge themselves as the Hottentots, in Pavilions of Small Branches of Trees. By Night our People saw Fires all over the Country; but when they drew near, the Natives were fled. The Coast is very low, but the Country far from the Sea is high.

Upon the Island near the coast have been seen Rats as great as Cats, in an innumerable Quantity; all which had a kind of Bag or Purse hanging from the Throat upon the Brest downwards. There were found many well-smelling Trees, and out of their Wood is to be drawn Oyl smelling as a Rose, but for the rest they were small and miserable Trees. There were also found some Birds nests of prodigious greatness, so that Six Men could not, by stretching out their Arms, encompass One of them; but the Fowls were not to be found.

There was great Store of Oysters, Lobsters, and Crabs; and also strange sorts of Fish. There were also Millions of Flies, very much troubling Men. They saw a great many Footsteps of Men and Children, but all of an ordinary bigness. The Coast is very foul and full of Rocks.

=== Other literature ===
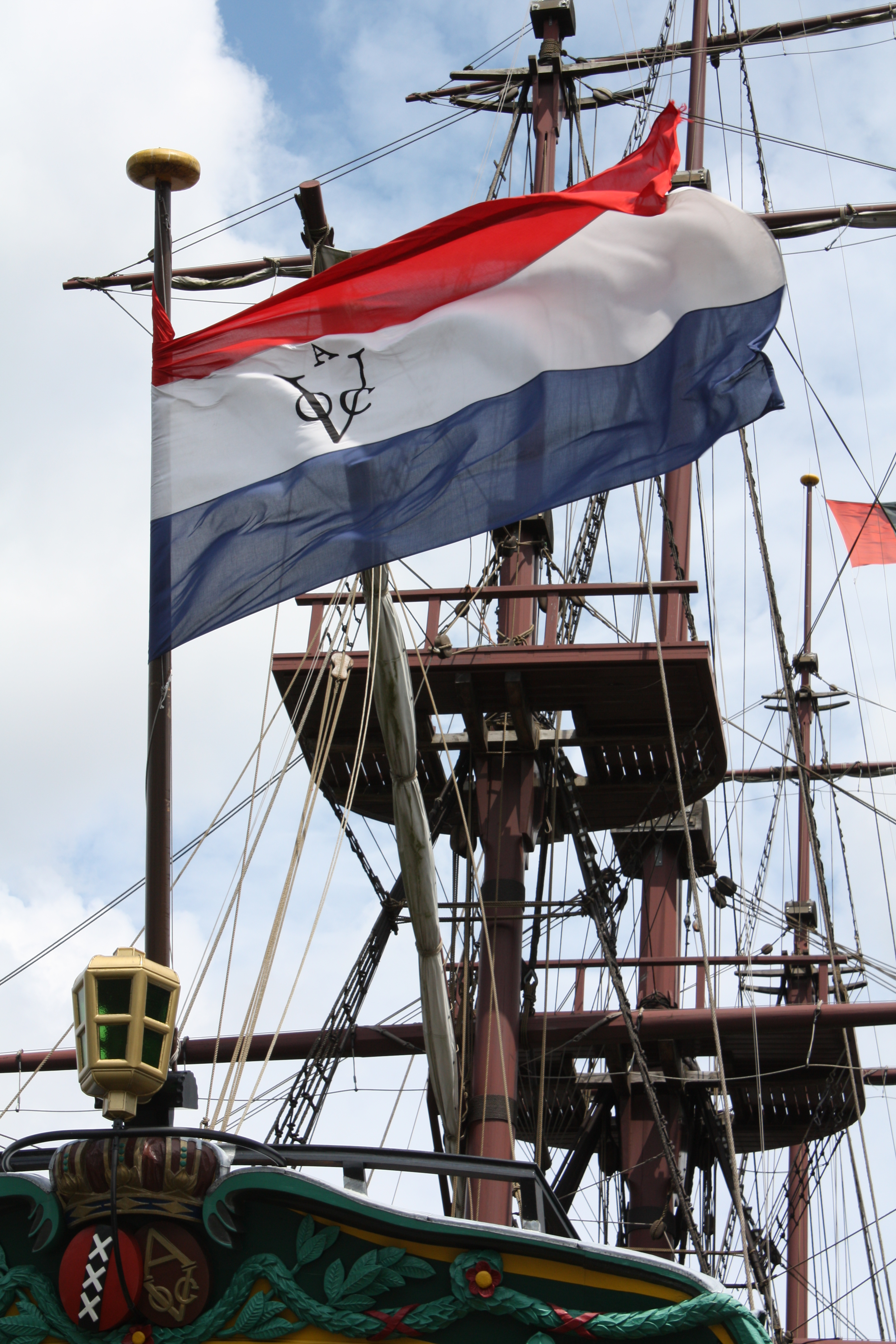
Replica of an East Indiaman of the Dutch East India Company/United East India Company (also known by the abbreviation "VOC" in Dutch). The VOC was a major force behind the early European exploration and mapping of Australia and Oceania.

In Gulliver's Travels (1726) by Jonathan Swift, the title character, travelling from Houyhnhnms Land, spends a few days on the southeast coast of New Holland before he is chased away by the natives.

The American author Edgar Allan Poe used the name New Holland to refer to Australia in his prize-winning 1833 short story "MS. Found in a Bottle":

the hulk flew at a rate defying computation ... and we must have run down the coast of New Holland.

In 1851, Herman Melville wrote, in a chapter of his novel Moby-Dick entitled "Does the Whale's Magnitude Diminish? – Will He Perish?":

... may the great whale outlast all hunting, since he has a pasture to expatiate in, which is precisely twice as large as all Asia, both Americas, Europe and Africa, New Holland, and all the Isles of the sea combined.

In 1854, another American writer, Henry David Thoreau, used the term New Holland (referring to the territory of the "wild" indigenous Australians) in his book Walden; or, Life in the Woods, in which he writes:

So, we are told, the New Hollander goes naked with impunity, while the European shivers in his clothes.

== See also ==
- History of Western Australia
- Terra Australis
- European exploration of Australia
