= Geographe Bay =

Bay in south-west of Western Australia

Coordinates: 33.58°S 115.25°E

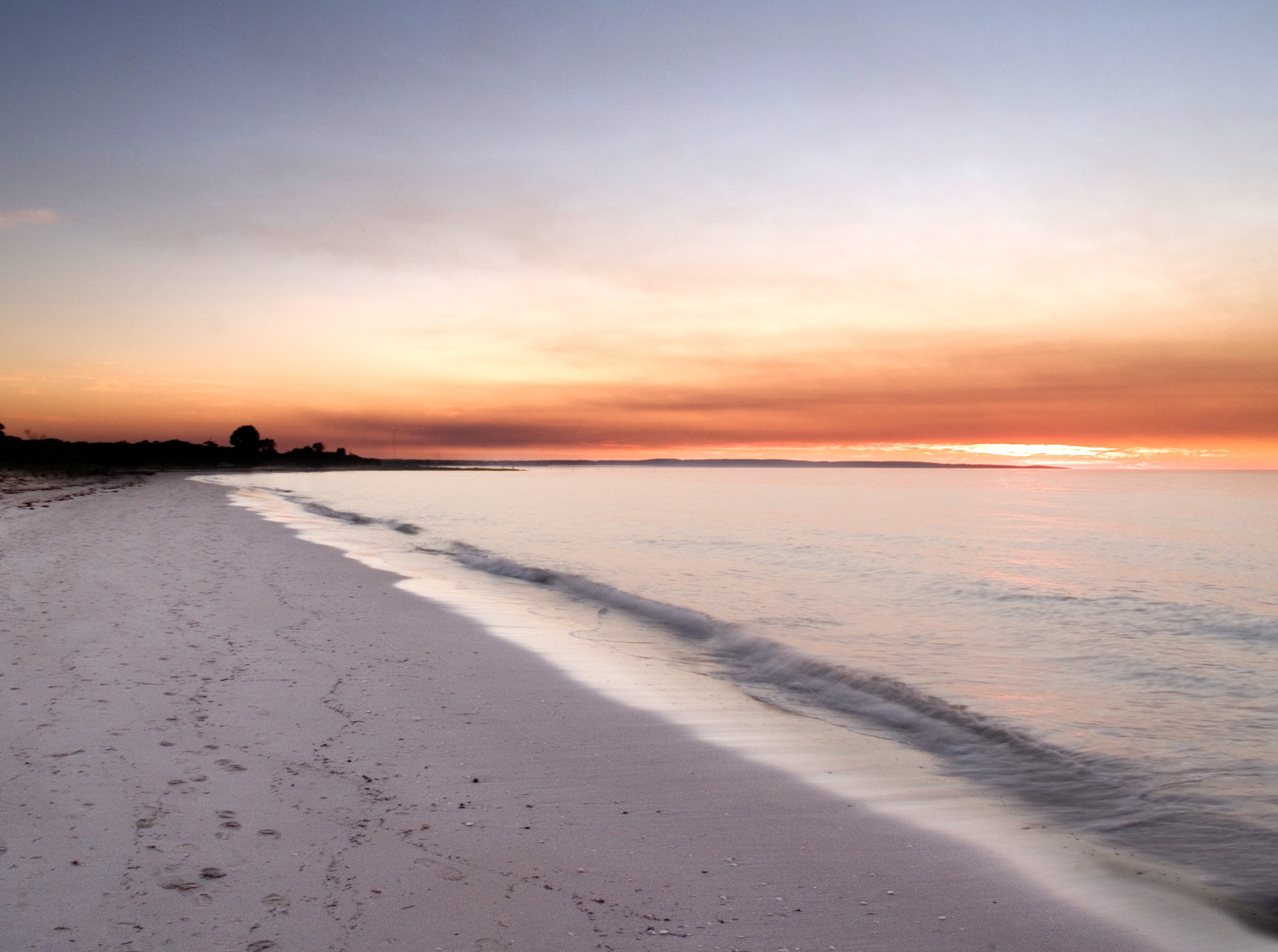
Geographe Bay at sunset, looking towards Cape Naturaliste

Geographe Bay is in the south-west of Western Australia, around 220 kilometres (140 mi) southwest of Perth.

The bay was named in May 1801 by French explorer Nicolas Baudin, after his ship, Géographe. It is a wide curve of coastline extending from Cape Naturaliste past the towns of Dunsborough and Busselton, ending near the city of Bunbury. Protected from the rough seas of the Indian Ocean by Cape Naturaliste (named after Naturaliste), which makes it a popular destination for recreational boaters, the bay is extremely shallow, limiting the entrance of large ships. To alleviate this problem the two-kilometre-long (1.2 mi) Busselton Jetty, the longest in the Southern Hemisphere, was built.

Royal Australian Navy frigate HMAS Swan was sunk in the bay off the town of Dunsborough on 14 December 1997, for use as a dive wreck. The bay also attracts whale watchers, who see it as an alternative to Flinders Bay, and the north-west part of the bay is the location of a number of surf breaks.

The environment of the drainage systems into the bay, and the bay itself have attracted research and studies.
