= René Maugé de Cely =

French zoologist (1757-1802)

René Maugé (born in 1757 - died 20 February 1802) was a French zoologist known for his work accompanying the Baudin Expedition.

== Background ==
René Maugé was born in 1757 in Cély-en-Bière, Seine-et-Marne. Details about his early life are unknown. In May 1794, he started work at the Muséum Nationale d’Histoire Naturelle where he was trained in taxidermy by Louis Dufresne.

From 1796 to 1798, he joined Nicolas Baudin on a government-supported expedition to collect bird specimens in Tenerife, St. Thomas, St. Croix and Puerto Rico. There, Maugé collected 296 bird specimens.

On 19 October 1800, aged 42, he again joined Baudin on Expédition aux terres australes (1800-1804) a voyage to Tenerife, Mauritius, Australia and Timor with the corvette Le Géographe and the store-ship Le Naturaliste. Maugé was appointed by Antoine-Laurent de Jussieu, director of the Muséum Nationale d’Histoire Naturelle, as one of the official expedition zoologists. The scientific expedition and collection of specimens was challenging in the uncharted territory. On the expedition to Timor, Maugé would describe at least fifty-two species new to science.

On 20 February 1802, Maugé died of dysentery on board the Le Géographe off the east coast of Tasmania. His body is buried at Point Mauge on Maria Island. His death was a considerable blow to the expedition. After his death, many of Maugé's collections from Timor were dispersed and some were lost.

== Zoological tributes ==
- Aratinga chloroptera maugei, Puerto Rican conure, taxonomic authority Charles de Souancé, 1856.
- Dicaeum maugei, the blue-cheeked flowerpecker, taxonomic authority René Primevère Lesson 1830.
- Geopelia maugeus, barred dove, taxonomic authority Coenraad Jacob Temminck, 1809.
- Testacella maugei, species of carnivorous land slug, taxonomic authority André Étienne d'Audebert de Férussac, 1819.
- The Maugean skate, discovered in Tasmania, Australia, in 1988, was named for Maugé.
