= French corvette Naturaliste =

French ship

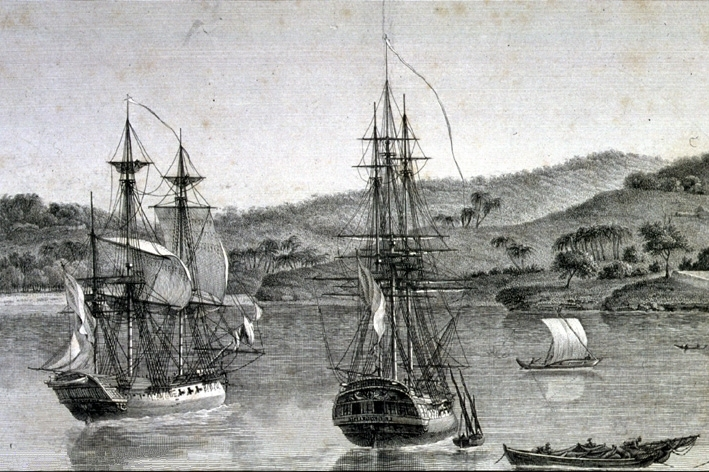
- Géographe and Naturaliste

History

France
- Name: Menaçante
- Namesake: Menacing
- Builder: Le Havre
- Laid down: August 1793
- Launched: 12 September 1795
- In service: February 1796
- Renamed: Naturaliste
- Fate: Sold 25 January 1811

General characteristics
- Class & type: Salamandre class
- Displacement: 650-687 tons (French)
- Tons burthen: 350-400 (French; "port tonnage")
- Length: 39.0 m (128.0 ft)
- Beam: 8.8 m (29 ft)
- Draught: 3.7 m (12 ft)
- Propulsion: Sail
- Complement: Menaçante:86-150; Naturaliste:114
- Armament: 10 × 8-pounder guns + 2 × 12-inch mortars; By 1796 the mortars were removed and she carried 22 × 8-pounder guns; For her 1800 commission, the armament was reduced to 10 × 6-pounder guns; The 22 × 8-pounder guns were restored in July 1803

Naturaliste (French pronunciation: [natyʁalist]) was one of the two-vessel Salamandre-class of galiotes à bombes of the French Navy. Under Jacques Hamelin, and together with Géographe she took part in the exploration of Australia of Nicolas Baudin.

== Design and early career ==
She was constructed, and probably designed, by Pierre-Alexandre Forfait. Her plans are dated 14 January 1793. She was launched in 1795 as Menaçante, and completed as a gabarre.

The navy transferred her towards the end of 1798 to Delamotte and Co. to serve as a privateer. In December, however, she was serving as a barracks for a detachment of naval artillerymen. A Sieur Longayron proposed, in December 1799, to charter her to carry some 200–250 colonists to Santo Domingo. Nothing came of this as Longayron was unable to provide a sufficient surety bond.

Menaçante was renamed Naturaliste in June 1800 and designated as a corvette.

== Voyage of exploration ==
Naturaliste and Géographe sailed from Le Havre on 19 October 1800 and reached Tenerife on 13 November. The two vessels crossed the equator on 11 December and arrived at Isle de France (Mauritius), on 16 March 1801.

For some 18 months Naturaliste and Géographe explored the less-known regions of New Holland (Australia), and Van Diemen's Land. On 30 May Baudin made his first major discovery. Baudin named the bay they found that day on the coast of Western Australia Geographe Bay. Later, the cape at the south of the bay was named Cape Naturaliste.

In late 1802 the expedition was at Port Jackson, where the government sold 60 casks of flour and 25 casks of salt meat to Baudin to resupply his two vessels. The supplies permitted Naturaliste to return to France and Géographe to continue her explorations of the Australian coast.

On 9 December 1802 Naturaliste left the expedition at Tasmania to bring the first collections home. When she left Port Jackson, Naturaliste took with her the Colony's staff surgeon, Mr. James Thomson, whom Governor Philip Gidley King had given permission to return to England.

Naturaliste was detained at Isle de France for a few days, but then sailed for France. She was in the Channel when on 26 May 1803 HMS Minerve, under Captain Jahleel Brenton, detained her and brought the ship into Portsmouth. The British soon released Naturaliste, which arrived at Le Havre on 6 June.

== Fate ==
Naturaliste was decommissioned on 23 June 1803. She was then reclassified as a gabarre around 1807, and returned to Le Havre in 1808. She was condemned in December 1810 and sold on 25 January 1811 at Le Havre.

== Sources ==
- Barrey, Ph. (1907). "Notice sur les Constructeurs de Navires Havrais". Recueil des publications de la société havraise d'études diverses (in French) (1st trimester). Le Havre: Imprimerie H. Micaux.
- Fornasiero, F. Jean; Monteath, Peter; West-Sooby, John (2004). Encountering Terra Australis: The Australian Voyages of Nicolas Baudin and Matthew Flinders. Wakefield Press. ISBN 978-1862548749.
- Library Committee of the Commonwealth Parliament (1915). Historical Records of Australia. 1. Vol. 3, 1801–1802.
- Winfield, Rif; Roberts, Stephen S. (2015). French Warships in the Age of Sail 1786–1861: Design Construction, Careers and Fates. Seaforth Publishing. ISBN 9781848322042.
