= French corvette Géographe =

French Navy serpente-class corvette launched in 1800

Géographe
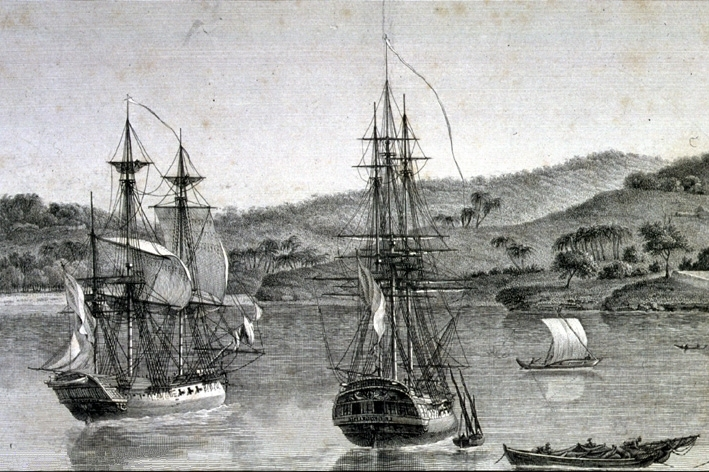
- Géographe and Naturaliste

History

France
- Name: Géographe
- Namesake: Geography
- Builder: Originally Deros, Havre, and at his death, Latch (October 1794), Honfleur
- Laid down: September 1794
- Launched: 8 June 1800
- Acquired: August 1800
- In service: September 1800
- Fate: Broken up after 6 April 1819

General characteristics
- Class & type: Serpente class
- Displacement: 727 tons
- Tons burthen: 350 tons
- Length: 40.3 m (132 ft)
- Beam: 9.7 m (32 ft)
- Draught: 3.8 m (12 ft)
- Propulsion: Sail
- Armament: 1800: 24 × 12-pounder long guns; 1804: 24 × 8-pounder long guns; 1806: 20 × 8-poundrs; 1811: 14 × 8-pounders

Géographe (French pronunciation: [ʒeɔɡʁaf]) was a 20-gun Serpente-class corvette of the French Navy. She was named Uranie in 1797, and renamed Galatée in 1799, still on her building site. Her builder refused to launch her, as he had not been paid to that time. Finally launched in June 1800, she was renamed Géographe on 23 August 1800.

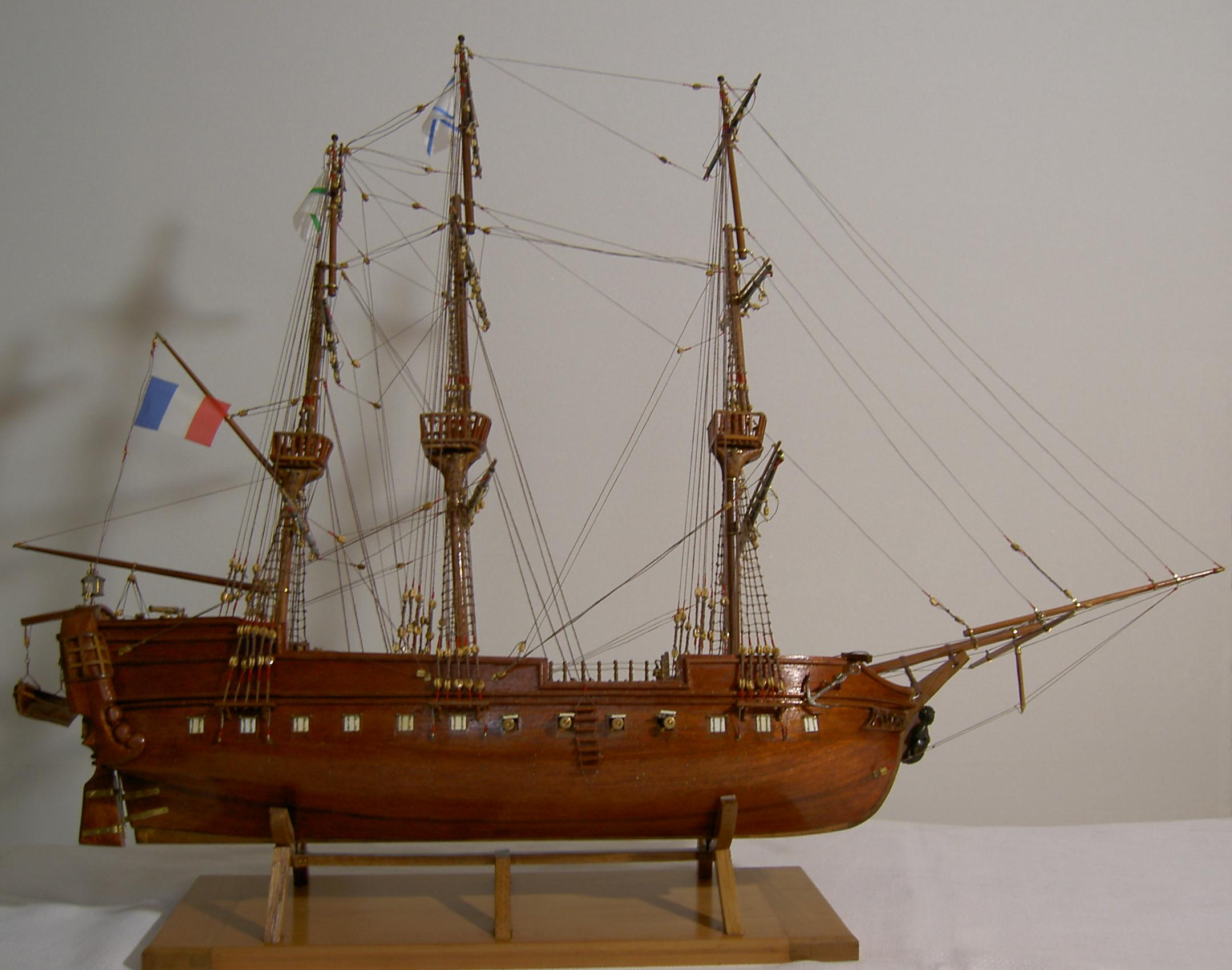
Model of Géographe now exhibited at the museum Ernest Cognac, in Saint-Martin-de-Ré

On 19 October 1800, under captain Nicolas Baudin, she departed Le Havre with Naturaliste for an exploration of Australia. She carried a number of scholars, painters, and designers, as well as Anselme Riedlé, the gardener, who had already accompanied Baudin on a previous expedition, and Charles Alexander Lesueur, an artist. The two vessels reached Tenerife on 13 November. They then crossed the equator on 11 December and arrived at Isle de France (Mauritius), on 16 March 1801.

For some 18 months Naturaliste and Géographe explored the less-known regions of New Holland (Australia), and Van Diemen's Land. On 30 May Baudin made his first major discovery. Baudin named the bay they found that day on the coast of Western Australia Geographe Bay. Later, the cape at the south of the bay was named Cape Naturaliste.

Riedlé died at Timor on 21 October 1801 where he was collecting specimens in the region of Kupang. Lasueur, with François Péron, took over the duties as naturalist after the death of the expedition's zoologist René Maugé. Together Lasueur and Maugé collected over 100,000 zoological specimens. In 1802 Lasueur made the only known sketches of the King Island emu in its natural habitat (the bird became extinct in 1822).

In late 1802 the expedition was at Port Jackson, where the government sold 60 casks of flour and 25 casks of salt meat to Baudin to resupply his two vessels. The supplies permitted Naturaliste to return to France and Géographe to continue her explorations of the Australian coast.

Géographe returned to Le Havre on 23 March 1804, under Frigate Captain Milius, as Baudin had died of tuberculosis at Mauritius during the expedition.

After her return her armament was steadily reduced. From 1807 she served as a powder hulk in the Caudran district at Lorient. The next year she became a barracks ship. In October 1811 Géographe replaced Société as the headquarters hulk for Lorient. Géographe was decommissioned in December 1807, but continued in use as a service craft.

== Fate ==
On 6 April 1819 Géographe was reported unserviceable and was struck, and presumably scrapped.

== Sources ==
- Barrey, Ph. (1907). "Notice sur les Constructeurs de Navires Havrais". Recueil des publications de la société havraise d'études diverses (in French) (1st trimester). Le Havre: Imprimerie H. Micaux.
- Fornasiero, F. Jean; Monteath, Peter; West-Sooby, John (2004). Encountering Terra Australis: The Australian Voyages of Nicolas Baudin and Matthew Flinders. Wakefield Press. ISBN 978-1862548749.
- Library Committee of the Commonwealth Parliament (1915). Historical Records of Australia. 1. Vol. 3, 1801–1802.
- Winfield, Rif; Roberts, Stephen S. (2015). French Warships in the Age of Sail 1786–1861: Design Construction, Careers and Fates. Seaforth Publishing. ISBN 9781848322042.
