= Nicolas Baudin =

French explorer (1754–1803)

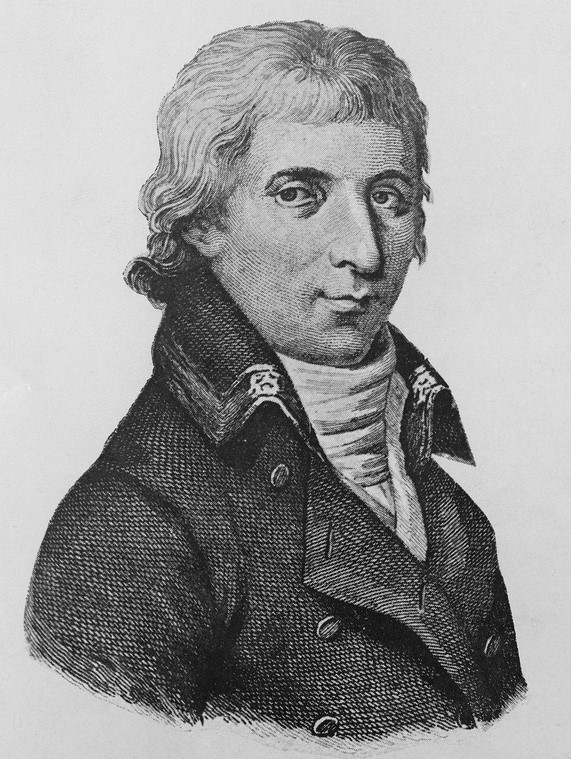
- 1800 portrait
- Born: 17 February 1754; Saint-Martin-de-Ré, Île de Ré, France
- Died: 16 September 1803 (aged 49); Isle de France
- Occupations: Explorer; cartographer; naturalist; hydrographer

Nicolas Thomas Baudin (French: [nikɔla bodɛ̃]; 17 February 1754 – 16 September 1803) was a French explorer, cartographer, naturalist and hydrographer best known for his explorations of Australia and the southern Pacific Ocean. He carried a few corms of Gros Michel banana from Southeast Asia, depositing them at a botanical garden on the French colony of Martinique.

== Biography ==
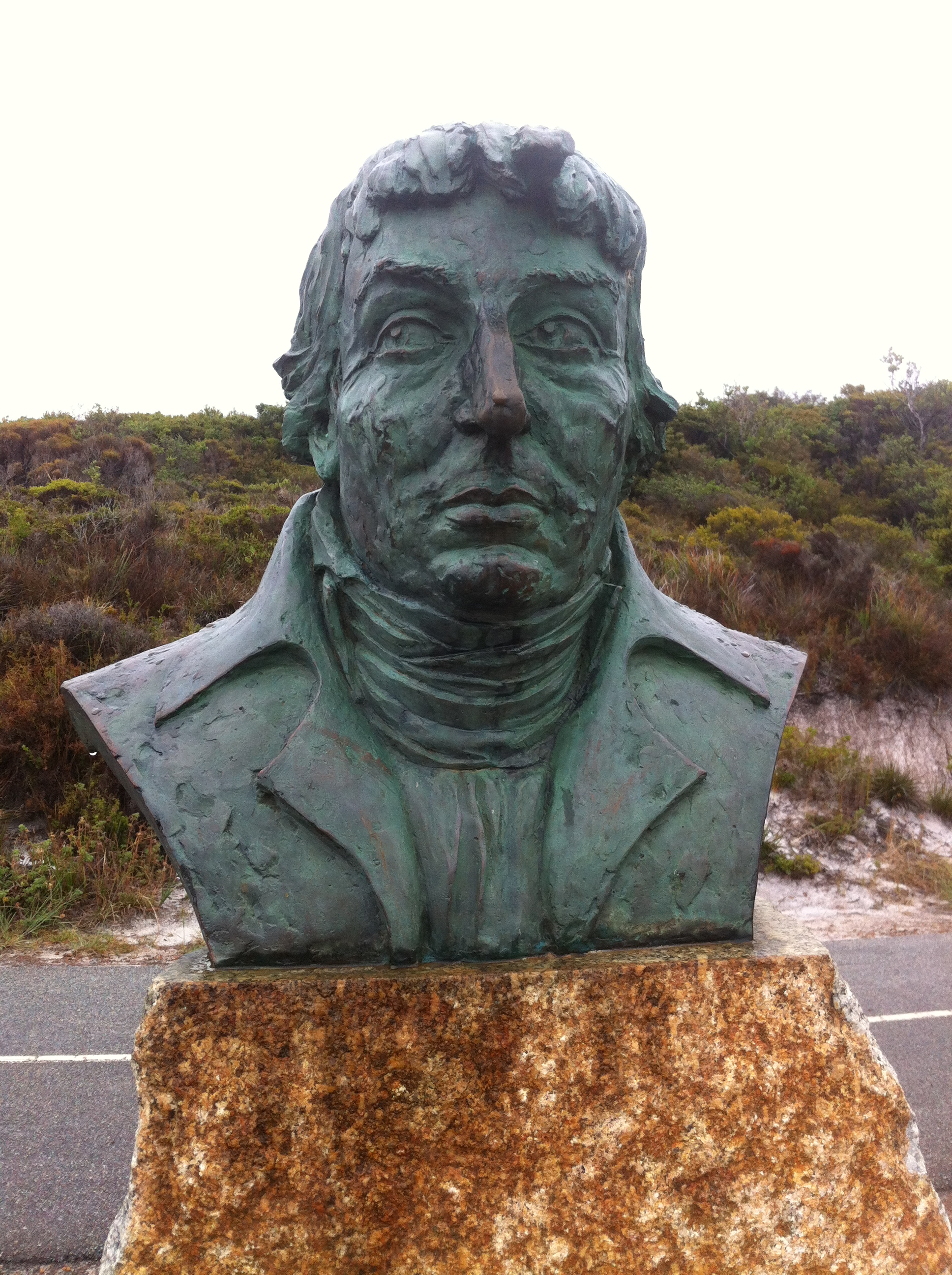
Bust of Baudin in Albany, Western Australia

=== Early career ===
Born a commoner in Saint-Martin-de-Ré on the Île de Ré on 17 February 1754, Nicolas Baudin joined the merchant navy as an apprentice (pilotin) at the age of 15; he was then "of average height with brown hair". He then joined the French East India Company at the age of 20 on Flamand. He returned from India on L'Étoile and arrived at Lorient.

At the beginning of 1778, he set sail from Nantes on Lion as second lieutenant. It was a ship equipped by his uncle, Jean Peltier Dudoyer, at the request of the Americans, which would become a privateer and be renamed Deane. At first the Minister for the Navy was against it, but he finally changed his mind and authorised the departure, as France had signed a treaty with the United States on 6 February. Since the atmosphere between the French and American crews on Lion became unbearable, Baudin was assigned by Lamotte-Picquet to Duc de Choiseul, a ship equipped by Jean Peltier Dudoyer. Officially it was heading for Saint-Domingue, but in fact the destination was Nova Scotia. However the vessel was shipwrecked at Liverpool, Nova Scotia.

Baudin was wounded, taken prisoner by the British on 24 April 1778 and interned in Halifax, Canada. After one month, he escaped with 10 other prisoners and hid among the friendly communities of Acadia. Appointed captain of the transport vessel Amphitrite, he was sunk by the English 160 nautical miles (290 km) out to sea, rescued in a rowing boat and made his way to Cape Cod and then Boston. As captain of Revanche, 400 tons, equipped by Jeange and sons of Bordeaux, with 30 men and 12 cannon, he was retaken by the English outside Cap-Français, heading for Boston. He was taken to Jamaica as a prisoner, then exchanged at the request of the Comte d'Argout, the Governor of Saint-Domingue. He returned to France on board the frigate Minerve, under the command of Captain de Grimouard, who was later guillotined at Rochefort under the Convention.

Back in France, he was appointed captain at the admiralty of La Rochelle on 2 March 1780 and was to sail in merchant ships. At the age of 27 he was named captain of Apollon, a civilian frigate of 1,100 tons and 42 cannon, fitted out by Jean Peltier Dudoyer. He was to form part of the convoy which took the Legion of Luxembourg to strengthen the defence of the Dutch Cape Colony at the Cape of Good Hope. However, during a stopover in Brest, the Comte d'Hector decided he would appoint a man with more experience, Felix de Saint-Hilaire. Having returned to Nantes, and to the annoyance of Beaumarchais, the owner of the vessel, Baudin's uncle entrusted him with the command of Aimable Eugenie, a ship of 600 tons, to go to Saint-Domingue and then to the US. He went back to Bordeaux and left the Gironde on 9 December 1782 as part of a convoy of five merchant vessels. Three days later, in the Action of 12 December 1782, the convoy was attacked by an English ship, HMS Mediator. After a hard battle, Baudin escaped, but two other ships owned by Beaumarchais were captured.

Reaching Saint-Domingue, the ship sank on 23 March 1783 at Puerto Plata, but the freight was saved. He negotiated for it and set off once again for Nantes on 23 April on Prince Royal, which he had bought on the spot. On 30 August he resold the boat, which in the meantime had become Union des 6 Frères, to Robert Pitot, a shipbuilder from the Isle de France who had just been freed from an English prison, and established himself as a trader in Bordeaux. The insurance company reimbursed Beaumarchais through his shipbuilder Peltier Dudoyer.

On 16 April 1784, Baudin left once more for Saint-Domingue on Comte d'Angevillier, 1,000 tons with eight cannon, and built by Jean Peltier. He was still accompanied by his brother Alexandre Baudin as first mate. They were now 29 and 27 years old. Baudin had a 25% stake in the voyage and they returned to Nantes on 8 December 1784.

On 21 April 1785, he wrote to Benjamin Franklin requesting a recommendation to be accepted as a member of the Society of the Cincinnati. He signed his letter 'Commander of the private frigate Comte d'Angevilliers, Maison Peltier du Doyer quai de l'hôpital'.

On 22 July 1785, the Baudin brothers bought Caroline, a ship of 200 tons, built by the Thébaudière brothers. He was to take the last Acadians to Louisiana. He was a few months behind his brother Alexandre who was captain of Saint Remy, built by Jean Peltier Dudoyer. In La Nouvelle Orléans local merchants contracted him to take a cargo of wood, salted meat, cod and flour to Isle de France (now Mauritius), which he did in Josephine (also called Pepita), departing New Orleans on 14 July 1786 and arriving at Isle de France on 27 March 1787.

In the course of the voyage, Josephine had called at Cap‑Français in Haiti to make a contract to transport slaves there from Madagascar; while in Haiti he also encountered the Austrian botanist Franz Joseph Märter, who apparently informed him that another Austrian botanist, Franz Boos, was at the Cape of Good Hope awaiting a ship to take him to Mauritius. Josephine called at the Cape and took Boos on board. At Mauritius, Boos chartered Baudin to transport him and the collection of plant specimens he had gathered there and at the Cape back to Europe, which Baudin did, with Josephine arriving at Trieste on 18 June 1788. The Imperial government in Vienna was contemplating organizing another natural-history expedition, to which Boos would be appointed, in which two ships would be sent to the Malabar and Coromandel coasts of India, the Persian Gulf, Bengal, Ceylon, Sumatra, Java, Borneo, Cochin China, Tongking, Japan, and China. Baudin had been given reason to hope that he would be given command of the ships of this expedition.

=== Austrian expeditions ===
Later in 1788, Baudin sailed on a commercial voyage from Trieste to Canton in Jardinière. He apparently arrived at Canton from Mauritius under the flag of the US, probably to avoid the possibility of having his ship seized by the Chinese for payment of the debts owed them by the Imperial Asiatic Company of Trieste. From there, he sent Jardinière under her second captain on a fur-trading venture to the north-west coast of America, but the ship foundered off Asuncion Island in the Northern Marianas Islands in late 1789.

Baudin made his way to Mauritius, where he purchased a replacement ship, Jardinière II, but this vessel was wrecked in a cyclone that struck Port Louis on 15 December 1789. Baudin embarked on the Spanish Royal Philippines Company ship, Placeres, which sailed from Port Louis for Cadiz in August 1790. Placeres called at the Cape of Good Hope where it took on board the large number of plant and animal specimens collected in South Africa for the Imperial palace at Schönbrunn by Georg Scholl, the assistant of Franz Boos. Because of the poor condition of the ship, Placeres had to put in at the island of Trinidad in the West Indies, where Scholl's collection of specimens was deposited.

Baudin proceeded to Martinique, from where he addressed an offer to the Imperial government in Vienna to conduct to Canton commissioners who would be empowered to negotiate with the Chinese merchants there a settlement of the debts incurred by the Imperial Asiatic Company, which would enable the company to renew its trade with China. On its return voyage from Canton, the proposed expedition would call at the Cape of Good Hope to pick up Scholl and the remainder of his natural-history collection for conveyance to Schönbrunn.

After returning to Vienna in September 1791, Baudin continued to press his case for an expedition under the Imperial flag to the Indian Ocean and China, and in January 1792 he was granted a commission of captain in the Imperial navy for this purpose. A ship, called Jardinière, was acquired and the botanists Franz Bredemeyer and Joseph van der Schot appointed to the expedition. After delays caused by the outbreak of war between France and Austria (April 1792), Jardinière departed from the Spanish port of Málaga on 1 October 1792. From the Cape of Good Hope Jardinière sailed across the Indian Ocean to the coast of New Holland (Australia), but two consecutive cyclones prevented the expedition from doing any work there and forced Baudin to take the ship to Bombay for repairs.

From Bombay the expedition proceeded to the Persian Gulf, the Red Sea and the east coast of Africa, where it gathered botanical and zoological collections. The expedition came to an abrupt end in June 1794 when Jardinière went aground in a storm while attempting to enter Table Bay at the Cape of Good Hope. Baudin survived the wreck and made his way to the US, from where he went to France. As the Cape had been occupied by the English in June 1795, Baudin went back to New England. On 23 November 1795, he set sail from New York as a passenger on board the American ship, Ocean, under the command of Captain Vredemburgh and also accompanied by General de Rochambeau, the Governor of Saint Lucia, the French Consul in Boston and a colonial trader from Saint-Domingue, Jean Baptiste Rivière de la Souchère (known as Souchère-Rivière). They arrived in Le Havre on 21 December 1795. Baudin believed that he was expected and offered his services and his talents. He wrote to the Minister to give notice of his imminent arrival in Paris. He would have been somewhat disappointed had he seen the little note at the top of the letter 'Could Bonneville please tell me if he knows Captain Baudin and for which mission he was responsible?' He managed to send Jardinière's cargo of natural history specimens to the island of Trinidad.

=== Belle Angélique Expedition ===
In Paris, Baudin visited Antoine de Jussieu at the Muséum National d'Histoire Naturelle in Paris in March 1796 to suggest a botanical voyage to the Caribbean, during which he would recover the collection of specimens he had left in Trinidad. The museum and the French government accepted the proposal, and Baudin was appointed commander of an expedition in Belle Angélique, with four assigned naturalists: René Maugé, André Pierre Ledru, Anselme Riedlé and Stanislas Levillain. Belle Angélique cleared Le Havre on 30 September 1796 for the Canary Islands, where the ship was condemned as unseaworthy. The expedition sailed from the Canaries in a replacement vessel, Fanny, and reached Trinidad in April 1797. The British, who had just captured the island from the Spanish in February 1797, refused to allow Baudin to recover the collection of natural-history specimens. Baudin took Fanny to St. Thomas and St. Croix, and then to Puerto Rico, specimens being collected in all three islands. At St Croix, Fanny was replaced by a newly purchased ship, renamed Belle Angelique. The expedition returned to France in June 1798 with a large collection of plants, birds and insects, which was incorporated into Bonaparte's triumphal procession, on 27 July, celebrating his recent Italian victories. On the recommendation of the Naval Minister to the Directory, Baudin was reinstated into the navy with the rank of Chief of Staff to Admiral Bruix, who at his request, granted to Marie-Etienne Peltier the command of a corsair, the Virginie. Baudin joined Bruix on Océan, on which Bruix was in charge of the squadron which resupplied Genoa.

=== New Holland Expedition ===
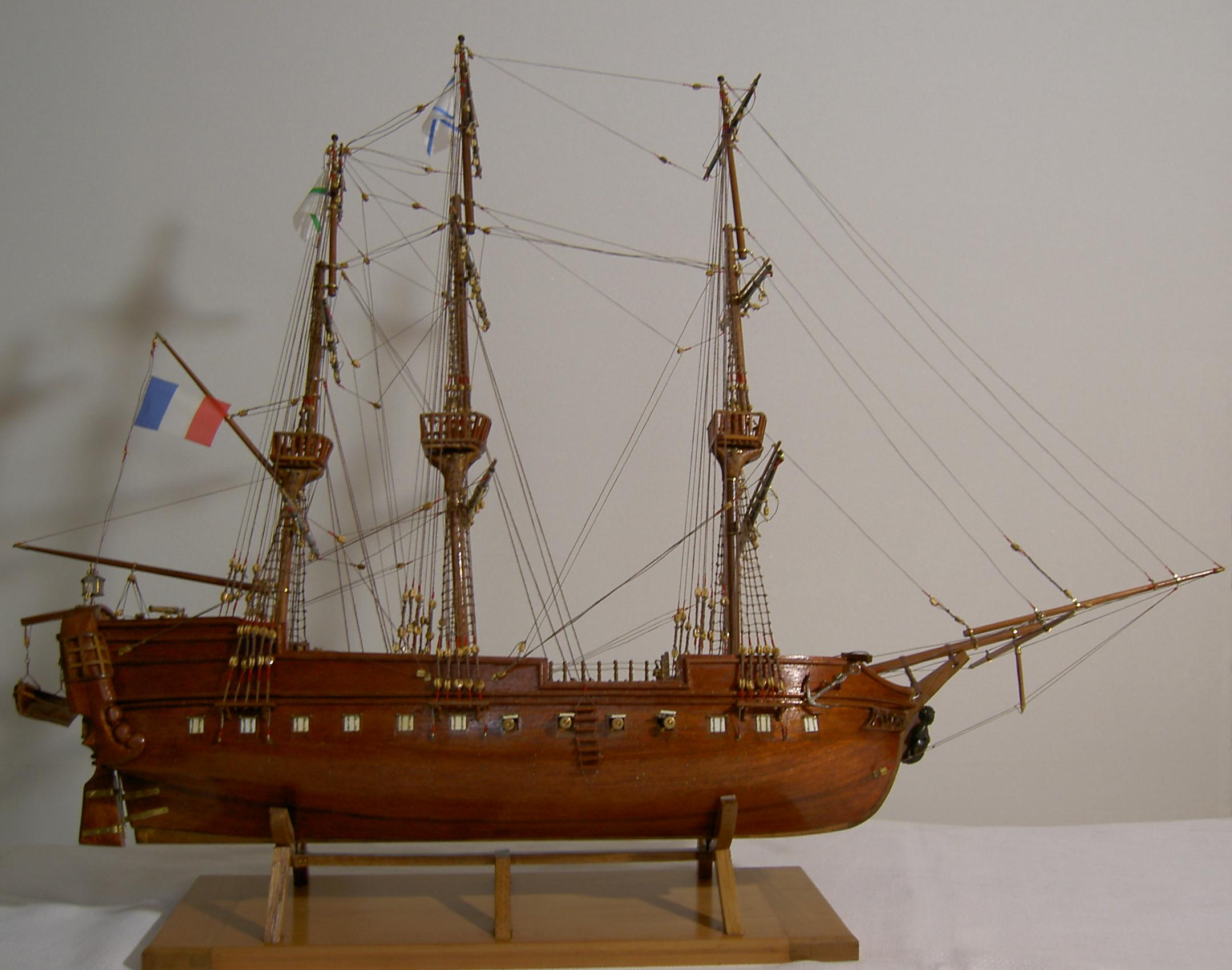
Model of Géographe, now exhibited at the Ernest Cognacq Museum in Saint-Martin-de-Ré in Charente-Maritime, France.

On 24 July 1798, at the suggestion of the Ministry of Marine, Baudin presented to the Assembly of Professors and Administrators of the National Museum of Natural History a plan for a hydrographic-survey expedition to the South Seas, which would include a search for fauna and flora that could be brought back for cultivation in France. The expedition would also have the aim of promoting the economic and commercial interests of France in the regions to be visited. The expedition would require two well-equipped ships, which would carry a team of astronomers, naturalists and scientific draughtsmen over whom Baudin as commander would have absolute authority. The first part of the voyage would be devoted to a thorough exploration of the coast of Chile and the collection of animal, bird and plant specimens suitable for acclimatization in France, followed by a survey of the coasts from Peru to Mexico. The expedition would then continue into the Pacific Ocean, including a visit to Tahiti and the Society Islands, and would be completed with a survey of the yet unexplored south-west coast of New Holland (Australia). After considering this extensive proposal, the French government decided to proceed with an expedition confined to a survey of western and southern New Holland.

In October 1800, Baudin was selected by Bonaparte, whose wife Josephine had something of a fascination with Australia, to lead what has become known as the Baudin expedition to map the coast of New Holland. He had two ships, Géographe and Naturaliste captained by Hamelin, and a suite of nine zoologists and botanists, including Jean Baptiste Leschenault de la Tour. Baudin left Le Havre on 19 October 1800, stopped off in Santa Cruz de Tenerife, then sailed straight to the Ile de France arriving on 15 March 1801, 145 days later. The over-long voyage, with early rationing, left sailors and scientists feeling discouraged, but the colony was happy to build up the crews in case of conflict and to make use of the new skills they brought with them. The expedition reached Australia in May 1801, and explored and mapped the western coast, and a part of the little-known southern coast of the continent. The scientific endeavour proved a great success, with more than 2,500 new species discovered. The French also met Aboriginal peoples and treated them with great respect.

Discussion of Baudin and Matthew Flinders' race to map Australia.

In April 1802, Baudin met Matthew Flinders, also engaged in charting the coastline, in Encounter Bay in present-day South Australia. Baudin then stopped at the British colony at Sydney for supplies, and from there he sent home Naturaliste, carrying all of the specimens that had been collected by both ships up to that time. According to recent research by academics from the University of Adelaide, during Baudin's expedition, François Péron, who had become the chief zoologist and intellectual leader of the mission, wrote a report for Bonaparte on ways to invade and capture the colony.

On 18 June 1802 Baudin took the Geographe into Port Jackson, now Sydney Harbour, and sought the assistance of the Governor, Philip Gidley King. La Naturaliste followed some ten days later. Both his ships and his men were in dire straits, with the majority of his crew suffering from scurvy. Governor King who had been informed by Sir Joseph Banks of Baudin's expedition gave Baudin a warm welcome and did all he could to nurse the crew back to health and repair the ships. During their months in Port Jackson Baudin formed a close relationship with King despite some minor disagreements which were exacerbated by others. Baudin was so impressed with King's hospitality that he wrote to the Governors of the French colonies at Isle de France and Reunion "Whatever the duties of hospitality may be, Governor King has given the whole of Europe the example of a benevolence which should be known, and which I take great pleasure in publishing." Baudin sailed from Port Jackson in November 1802, making his way south to the Bass Strait. There he despatched La Naturaliste home to France. In his last letter to King written from King Island in the Bass Strait Baudin wrote warmly and informatively and proposed that they should meet for dinner in Paris or London, '...for which you will have to pay'.

Realising that Géographe could not venture into some of the shallow waters along the Australian coast that he was intending to survey, he bought a new ship, Casuarina, named after the wood it was made from, and placed it under the command of Louis de Freycinet, who would, 15 years later, make his own circumnavigation of the world in the corvette l'Uranie. He then headed back to Tasmania, before continuing along the southern and western coasts of Australia to Timor, mapping as he went. In very poor health, he then turned for home.

== Death ==
Baudin died of tuberculosis at Mauritius on 16 September 1803, at the age of 49, apparently in the home of Madame Alexandrine Kerivel. Baudin's exact resting place is not known, but the historian Auguste Toussaint believed that he was interred in the Kerivel family vault. However, the historian Edward Duyker likes to think that Baudin was buried in Le Cimetière de l’Ouest in the district of Port Louis, "just a few hundred metres from the explorer’s certain love: the sea".

These were his last wishes:

"He gives and bequeaths to citizen Augustin Baudin, his brother, currently in India, his silver marine watch, his night telescope and an 'Oriental Neptune'. He gives and bequeaths to Citizen Ronsin, wife of Citizen Louis Peltier, his porcelain from Saxony and Chantilly, consisting of three services, one of twelve cups, one of six and one of two pieces plus his gold watch. He names as the Executor of his will Citizen Louis Peltier (brother of Jean Peltier Dudoyer), Judge of the Court of Appeal of this colony, to whom he entrusts the execution of the present document wishing and expecting that his goods be distrained in accordance with usual custom."

== Legacy ==
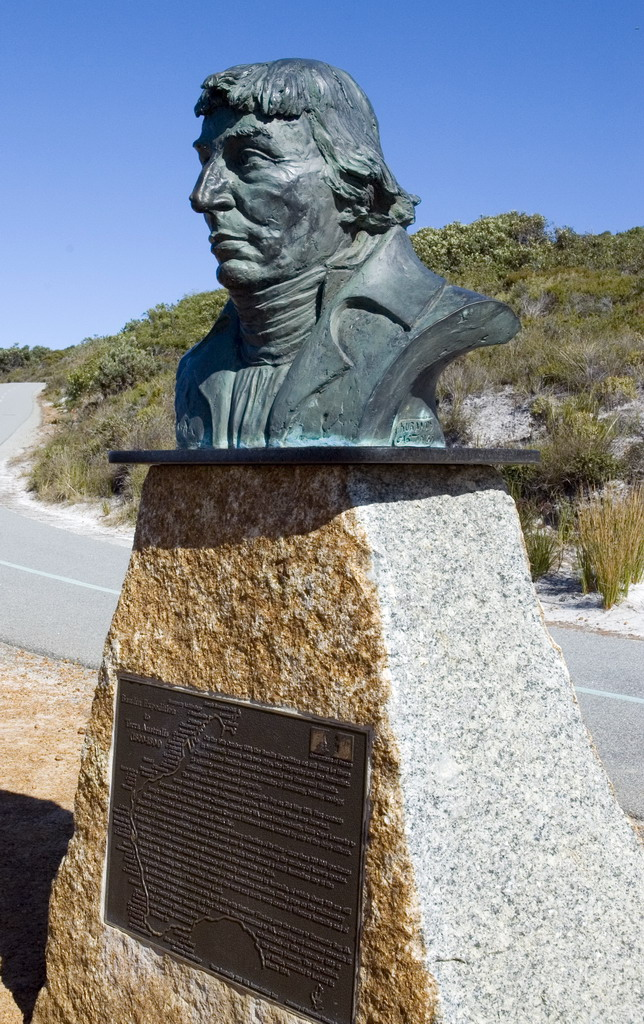
Nicolas Baudin Monument at Albany, Western Australia

=== Places and monuments ===
A number of monuments have been established around Australia, including eight at various locations around Western Australia.

In Western Australia, there are many places that bear names from the French ships, sponsors and crew of Baudin's 1801–04 voyage and Louis de Freycinet's voyage in 1802–3, including:

- Cape Peron
- Cape Naturaliste
- Cape Freycinet
- D'Entrecasteaux National Park
- Cape Le Grand National Park
- Carnac Island
- Geographe Bay
- Geographe (Busselton suburb)
- Vasse (Busselton suburb)
- Vasse River
- Leschenault (Bunbury suburb)
- Esperance
- Hamelin Bay

In South Australia, the following places bear Baudin's name:

- Baudin Beach on Kangaroo Island
- Baudin Rocks on the south-east coast of the state
- Nicolas Baudin Island, on the west coast of Eyre Peninsula

In the Australian Capital Territory, Baudin Street in the suburb of Forrest bears his name.

=== Animals ===
Six animals are named in his honour:

- Calyptorhynchus baudinii Lear, 1832 – Baudin's black cockatoo
- Smilisca baudinii (A.M.C. Duméril & Bibron, 1841) – common Mexican tree frog (Hylidae)
- Emoia baudini (A.M.C. Duméril & Bibron, 1839) – Baudin's emo skink (Scincidae)
- Pseudemoia baudini (Greer, 1982) – Bight Coast skink (Scincidae)
- Zanclea baudini Gershwin & Zeidler, 2003 – a jellyfish (Zancleidae)
- Baudin pig – a once feral landrace on Kangaroo Island

=== Film award ===
The Nicholas Baudin Award, or Nicholas Baudin Prize, is awarded at the Antipodean Film Festival in Saint Tropez, France, each year.

== See also ==
- Baudin expedition to Australia
- European and American voyages of scientific exploration
- Freycinet Map of 1811
