= Leblond =

Leblond or Le Blond is a surname, and may refer to:

== People ==
- Elizabeth Hawkins-Whitshed, known as Lizzie LeBlond after marriage, Irish mountaineer
- Auguste-Savinien Leblond, a French mathematician who coined the term metre
- Charles Hubert Le Blond, an American Catholic bishop
- Charles Philippe Leblond, a Canadian biologist
- Francis Celeste Le Blond, an American politician
- Guillame Le Blond, a French mathematician, great uncle of Auguste-Savinien (see above)
- Jacob Christoph Le Blon, a Frankfurt painter and engraver
- Jean Leblond, a Belgian long-distance runner
- Jean-Baptiste Leblond, a French materials scientist
- Jean-Baptiste Alexandre Le Blond, a French architect
- Jean-Marc Lévy-Leblond, a French physicist
- Louis Vincent Le Blond de Saint-Hilaire, a French general
- Marius-Ary Leblond, the pseudonym of a pair of French literary cousins
- Michel Leblond, a French football player
- Pierre-Luc Létourneau-Leblond, a Canadian hockey player
- Richard le Blond, an Irish lawyer of the 14th century

== Other ==
- Cape Leblond, a peninsula in Antarctica
- R. K. LeBlond Machine Tool Company, American industrial firm
  - LeBlond Aircraft Engine Corporation, subsidiary of above
    - LeBlond radial engines, family of aircraft engines designed by above
