= Ticking (sound) =

Rhythmic sound typically made by clocks

Illustration of the anchor escapement mechanism responsible for the ticking sound in pendulum clocks

Sound of a large grandfather clock ticking

Sound of a smaller clock ticking

Sound of a still smaller clock ticking

NASA video using the sound of a watch ticking in the background

Ticking is the sharp and rhythmic sound produced by various devices. It is particularly associated with mechanical clocks and watches, where it is created as their escapement mechanism regulates the movement of gears. It is also produced by the operation of certain devices not intended to keep time, such as turn signals. As technological advances have enabled the creation of such devices without mechanisms that create such a sound, some devices have artificial ticking sounds generated to resemble their historical counterparts.

== In timekeeping ==
In many analog timekeeping devices, clocks and watches specifically, this sound, often described as "ticking" or a "tick-tock", results from the interaction between the escapement and the gear train, marking the passage of time in discrete increments. Ticking has been a defining characteristic of mechanical timekeeping since the invention of early clocks in the Middle Ages, serving both a functional role in time measurement and a cultural symbol of temporality, so much so that by the 1860s, "ticker" was a slang term for a watch. While modern quartz and digital timekeeping devices are able to operate silently, ticking remains an iconic feature of traditional clocks, often associated with craftsmanship and nostalgia. Modern timekeeping devices are sometimes designed to replicate the ticking sound.

Physicist Chad Orzel has written that a clock can be "anything that 'ticks': that undergoes a regular, repeated action that can be counted to mark the passage of time". In music, the metronome also uses ticking as a means of marking increments of time, though not for determining the specific time of day. One of the earliest metronomes, a pendulum-based "chronomètre" built in 1696 by musician Étienne Loulié, produced no sound, meaning that the musician would need to watch the pendulum as if watching a conductor's baton. The more-familiar mechanical musical chronometre was invented by Dietrich Nikolaus Winkel in Amsterdam in 1814, based on a spring-powered, inverted pendulum rod with fixed and adjustable weights to achieve compactness. Johann Maelzel, incorporating Winkel's ideas, added a numerical scale, called it a metronome, and started mass-manufacturing the pyramid-shaped device in 1816 under his own name: "Maelzel's Metronome." The original text of Maelzel's patent in England (1815) can be downloaded.

The derived phrase, "tick-tock", is an onomatopoeia from the sound of a pendulum clock mechanism, though the word, "tick" is itself believed to be derived from a 14th century Middle English word meaning a "light touch or tap".

== In non-timekeeping devices ==
Some devices that do not have a timekeeping function are nevertheless noted for making ticking sounds. These include vehicle turn signals, Geiger counters, stock tickers, and older mechanical relays in electrical systems.

The characteristic ticking sound of a turn signal began as a function of the mechanism operating the signal. As with clocks and watches, mechanisms advanced so that they no longer required that the sound be made. Additional means were then created to replicate the ticking sound in order to ensure that the driver was aware that the turn signal remained on.

Ticker tape, the earliest electrical dedicated financial communications medium, transmitting stock price information over telegraph lines, was named for the ticking sound made by the machine as it printed.

== Artistic and metaphorical uses of ticking ==
With respect to the use of ticking to set a mood in audiovisual media, sound designer David Sonnenschein writes that "the sound of ticking when we see a clock in the room or on someone's wrist remains a concrete sound, but as soon as this same sound that is now unlinked to the image pervades a scene with its emotional effect of urgency or relentlessness as the underlying tone, it then falls into the area of musical sounds".

The sound of ticking has itself come to represent the conceptual passage of time itself, and has consequently been used to evoke certain reactions in film and television. For example, the opening sequence and cut-to-commercial sequences of the news magazine show 60 Minutes features a ticking Aristo stopwatch, which became sufficiently well-recognized that the stopwatch used was added to collection of the Smithsonian Institution in 1998.

The rhythmic beating of the heart is also metaphorically referred to as "ticking", such that "ticker" has become a slang term for the heart, and a living person or a working machine may colloquially be referred to as "still ticking". The Timex Corporation has used the advertising slogan, "It takes a licking and keeps on ticking" to assert the durability of its wristwatches since 1956.

== See also ==
- Beat (acoustics)
- Chirp
- Click (acoustics)
- Ticking time bomb scenario
