= Sonomètre of Loulié =

Musical instrument tuning device

The sonomètre (French: [sɔnɔmɛtʁ]) is a tuning device that French musician Étienne Loulié invented c. 1694 to facilitate the tuning of stringed instruments. Sébastien de Brossard considered this device to be "one of the finest inventions" of the 17th century.

On July 4, 1699, Étienne Loulié had the honor of presenting two inventions before the Royal Academy of Sciences in Paris. The records of the Academy (Procès verbaux) for that day read:

"Monsieur Loulié showed the Company a new machine he has invented, which he calls the sonomètre, by means of which anyone who has never tuned a harpsichord, as long as he has a sufficiently good ear to tune one string in unison with another, and one octave in unison with another, will on the first attempt tune the harpsichord as quickly, more easily, and in less time than the best music master tuning it by the ordinary method."

== The devices ==
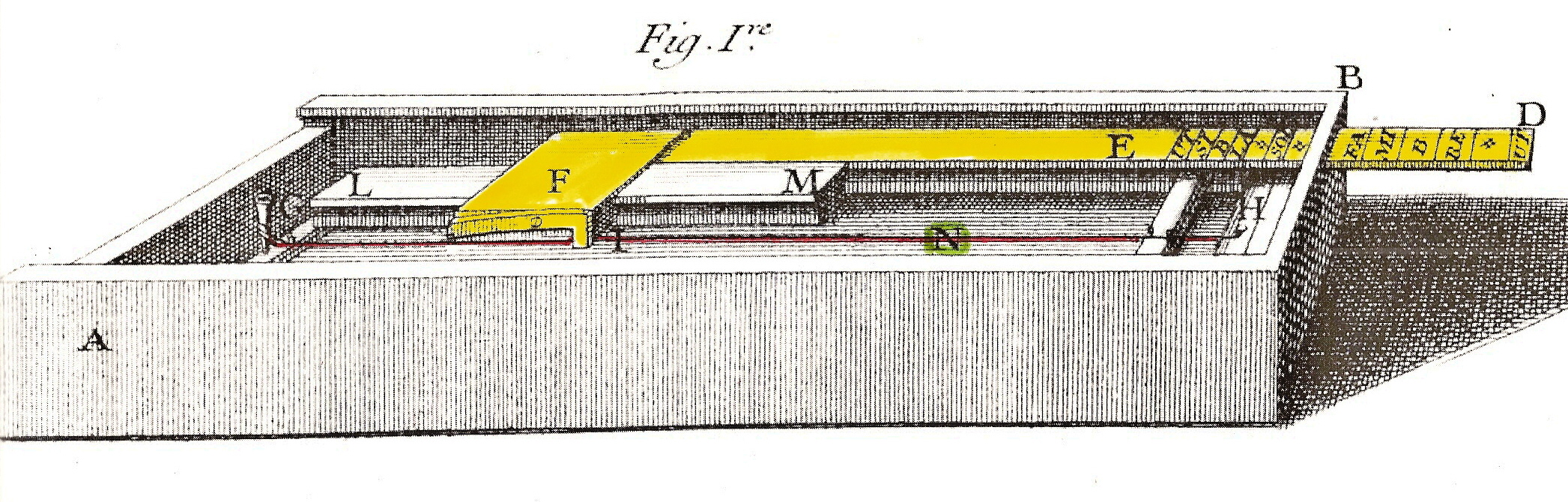
Loulié's portable sonomètre, 1699

Loulié invented both a table-top and a portable model of the sonomètre. Both versions are based on the same components. The first component is an instrument string (shown in red on the modified engravings) that is strung from one end to the other of a shallow rectangular wooden box. This string represents the "monochord" with which the sources equate the invention. The second component consists of one or more movable pieces of wood (shown in yellow on the engravings) that are marked to represent the 11 notes of the musical scale. The third component consists of something with which to pluck the string (shown in green on the engravings), in one case the user's finger, in the other a lever.

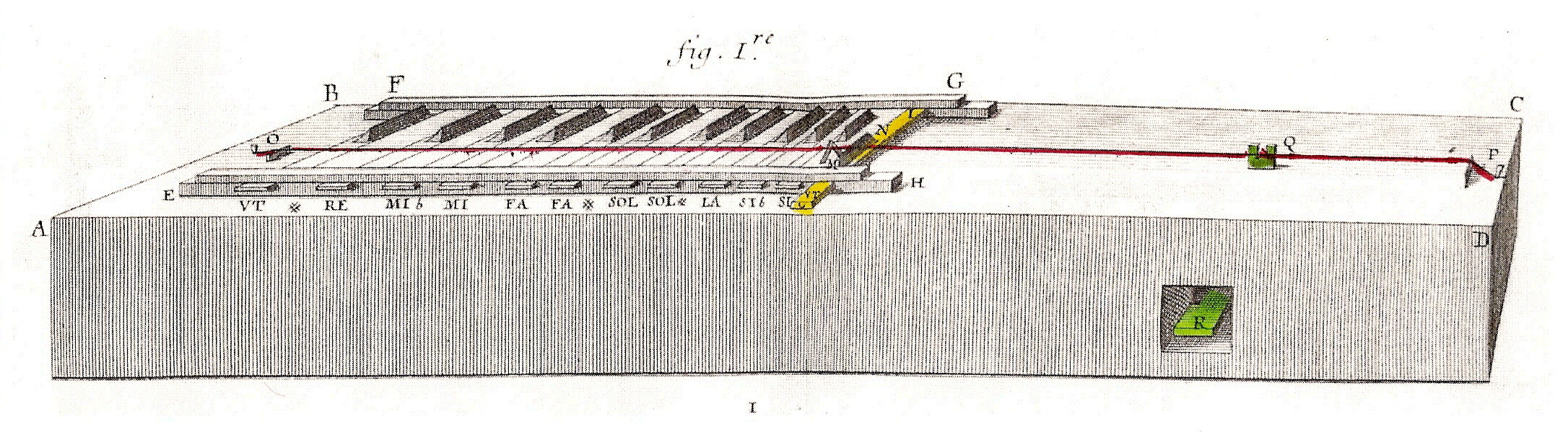
Loulie's table-top version of the sonomètre, 1699

The box of the portable sonomètre is only 5 1/4 inches long. It could fit into a large pocket. To obtain a specific note of the scale – for example the F♯ shown in the engraving – a graduated strip of wood (highlighted in yellow) is slid out from at opening at the of the box and is held in position (at "Fa♯") with a pin inserted in a hole in the strip. Pulling out this graduated strip of wood causes the inner end of the movable piece to rest on the string, shortening or lengthening its length so that the desired pitch will be sounded. When everything is in place, the user plucks the string with his finger, at the point marked N (circled in green), and F♯ is sounded. He plucks the string as often as needed, until the F-sharp key of the instrument being tuned matches the sound being produced by the sonomètre. At that point he tunes all the F-sharp strings on the instrument, to put them in unison with the original F♯. And so on, for the entire octave.

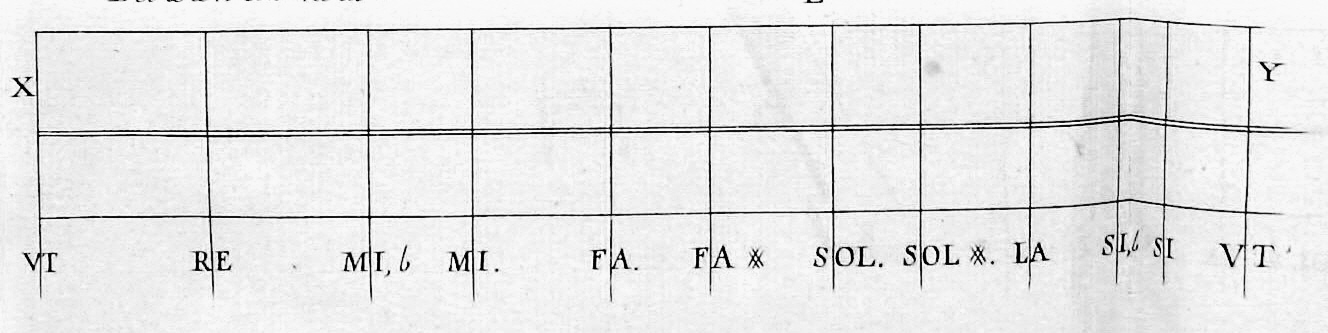
The proportions of the "exact division of the notes" in Loulié's table-top sonomètre

At first glance the larger sonomètre resembles the keyboard of a harpsichord, with its dark and light keys. However, the 11 raised dark objects are not keys, they are low triangular wedges that function like the frets of a viol. That is to say, when one of the 11 levers is pulled forward – as UT, C, is in the engraving (yellow) – the little wedge comes into contact with the string (red). A small L-shaped tool is then positioned over the string, pressing it down firmly, as a finger presses the string of a viol onto a fret. When everything is ready, the user presses a lever (green) in the front of the box and activates a harpsichord-like jack that rises and plucks the string, sounding a C. And so on, until the user has set the 11 pitches that will permit him to tune the entire keyboard.

The original illustration of this table-top device included the "proportions" of an "exact division of the notes" into the larger or smaller intervals characteristic of the unequal temperament preferred by Loulié.

In 1701 Loulié's former colleague, Joseph Sauveur, pointed out to his colleagues at the Academy of Sciences the shortcomings of Loulié's sonomètre and presented his own version of the device.

== The Academy's description ==
The sonomètre invented by Monsieur Loulié:

[In Figure 1] AB is a box that contains a sliding piece, DEF, that runs along the other piece, LM, that is attached to the bottom of the box. The end at ED comes out through an opening similar to the one cut in B. The other end [of the sliding piece], F, has a sort of right-angle bar [équerre] that is attached to it with a screw and that is pushed by a spring so that this right angle will pluck the string HNG at the place marked I.

The second figure [the sliding piece of wood] is the actual size and is divided according to the necessary proportions that will permit the string to produce the sound one desires for tuning any instrument whatsoever, which is done as follows:

At each dividing line on piece DE, which one passes through the opening B in the box. there is a little pin. When one wishes to hear a note, one pulls on the piece, to move the pin for that note. Then, applying that pin with precision against the opening in the box, one plucks the string with one's finger at N, and the string produces the desired sound. This effect is produced by the different positions in which one puts the sliding piece (DE) and the right-angle piece over the string (HG) The different distances from H create the different sounds.

This instrument is portable. It fits easily into a pocket. It is even used by harpsichord makers, who employ it to tune those sorts of instruments.

Another sonomètre invented by Monsieur Loulié

The top of the box (ABCD) has, in its mid-length, several bridges fixed to the ends of that same number of little movable boards, which fit between [the horizontal sticks] FG and EH. There are twelve of these little boards, which mark the divisions of all the notes of the entire octave, including flats and sharps. A string (OQP) produces the sound of these different notes when it is pinched by the little jack [sauterau] that is activated inside the box by the key R, where it rests upon a little fulcrum. Note that do [ut or C] is exactly in the middle of the two fixed points O and P.

When one wishes to tune an instrument, one pulls toward oneself the [little board] of the note one wishes to produce, so that the raised bridge is under the string. And to ensure that the string will touch the bridge firmly, one places over it a piece in the form of a right angle square [équerre]. For example, if one wants a do, one pulls board LI and the bridge affixed to it (MN); and one puts the square behind the bridge, then plucks the string with the jack.

The third figure shows the exact division of the notes, the different distances being marked out.
