= Yavor Konov =

Bulgarian musicologist (born 1964)

- Born: October 23, 1964 (age 61); Sofia, Bulgaria
- Occupations: Classical pianist and university professor
- Instrument: Piano
- Website: yavorkonov.alle.bg (in Bulgarian)

Yavor Svetozarov Konov, Bulgarian: Явор Светозаров Конов, (born 23 October 1964), is a Bulgarian classical pianist, professor, author, and translator of books, articles, and textbooks in music.

== Early life and education ==
Born in Sofia, Konov studied piano with Lyubomir Pipkov at the National Music High School in 1983. In 1991, he studied musicology (polyphony) and chorus conducting at the National Academy of Music, Sofia. Four years later, he finished a harpsichord master class in Orvieto, Italy. Having successfully presented his thesis, Konov earned a Doctor of Arts in 1998 and a Doctor of Arts and Sciences in 2006.

== Career ==
From November 1992 to November 2010, Konov worked at South-West University "Neofit Rilski" in Blagoevgrad. In 2005, Yavor Konov became Professor of Polyphony at the Department of Music at the Faculty of Arts. In 2008, he became Director of the University Resource Center for Francophone Studies at Southwest University. From December 2010, Yavor Konov worked as a professor at the Department of Music at New Bulgarian University, Sofia. He functioned as a guest lecturer at Sofia University and Krastyo Sarafov National Academy for Theatre and Film Arts. Prof. Konov was a co-founder and secretary of the Music Society "Vassil Stefanov" (Sofia). He was also a deputy editor-in-chief of the magazine Music. Yesterday. Today, from its establishment to 2012.

== Personal life ==
Yavor Konov was married to Assoc. Prof. Dr. Theodora Bolyarova-Konova, PhD, since 1999. They have 2 children – Theresa (2000) and Andrey (2007).

== Publications ==
Prof. Yavor Konov is an author of more than 200 publications, including textbooks, annotated translations, monographs, articles, scientific studies, etc.

Textbooks

- "About Polyphony" (1995, 2/2001, 3/2003)
- "Culture and Musical Art" (1997)
- "Ideas and Approaches for Natural Piano Playing" (2003)

Monographs

- “First Harpsichord Treatise: The Principles of Harpsichord” of de Saint-Lambert, 1702 (1998)
- “Sébastien de Brossard and his Dictionary of Music” (2003)
- “Over Gioseffo Zarlino and The Art of Counterpoint” (2004)
- “Lexicographic, Historiographic & Bibliographic Heritage of Sébastien de Brossard (1655–1730)": Ecclesiastic, Musician & Erudite (2008)
- “Sébastien de Brossard: Dictionary of Music (1705). Yavor Konov – translation and comments (2010)

Annotated translations of

- The Principles of Harpsichord (Paris, 1702) and New Treatise about the Accompaniment of Harpsichord, Organ and Other Instruments (Paris, 1707) by de Saint-Lambert (1998)
- Practical Elements of Thorough-Bass by W. A. Mozart (1999)
- The Art of Counterpoint (1558) by Gioseffo Zarlino (2003)

Electronic publications

- Konov, Yavor (2014) "About Johan Sebastian Bach, Inventions", Teaching at NBU. Working Paper. Scientific electronic archive of NBU
- Ferran, Dominique, and Konov, Yavor (2014). Historical review of old fingerings, translation, and comments. Scientific electronic archive of NBU
- Spit, Noel and Konov, Yavor (2014) "Harpsichord playing/tapping / according to Francois Couperin, Saint-Lambert, and Ramo", translation and comments. Scientific electronic archive of NBU
- Bomon, Olivier and Seru, Bruno, and Konov, Yavor (2015) "Harpsichord in all its states: An Interview with Professor Olivier Bomon, harpsichordist", July 4 and 8, 2003 / Yavor Konov, Translation and Comments. Scientific electronic archive of NBU
- Konov, Yavor (2015) "What could we talk about to anyone who came to study music and musicology at NBU". Scientific electronic archive of NBU

== Acknowledgement ==
His contribution to music and musicology is highly appreciated by the most authoritative institutions in this field – the Studio of Studies at the Baroque Music Center in Versailles and the Faculty of Music and Musicology of the University of Paris (Sorbonne). Konov is identified as an "excellent specialist" (2009). “Round Table around Yavor Konov” was held on November 24, 2011, in the library of Versailles. The event was organized in honor of the Bulgarian edition of The Dictionary of Music by de Brossard and on the initiative of leading French musicologists. The case is considered to create a precedent in French-Bulgarian relations.

== Awards and honors ==
- "Book of the Year" – award of the Union of Bulgarian Composers, section "Musicologists" (2003, 2004, 2008, 2010, 2019).
