= Joseph Marie =

Joseph Marie may refer to:

- Joseph Marie, baron de Gérando, French jurist, philanthropist and philosopher
- Joseph Marie, Count Dessaix, French general
