= Chronomètre of Loulié =

Music timing device

The chronomètre is a precursor of the metronome. It was invented circa 1694 by Étienne Loulié to record the preferred tempo of pieces of music.

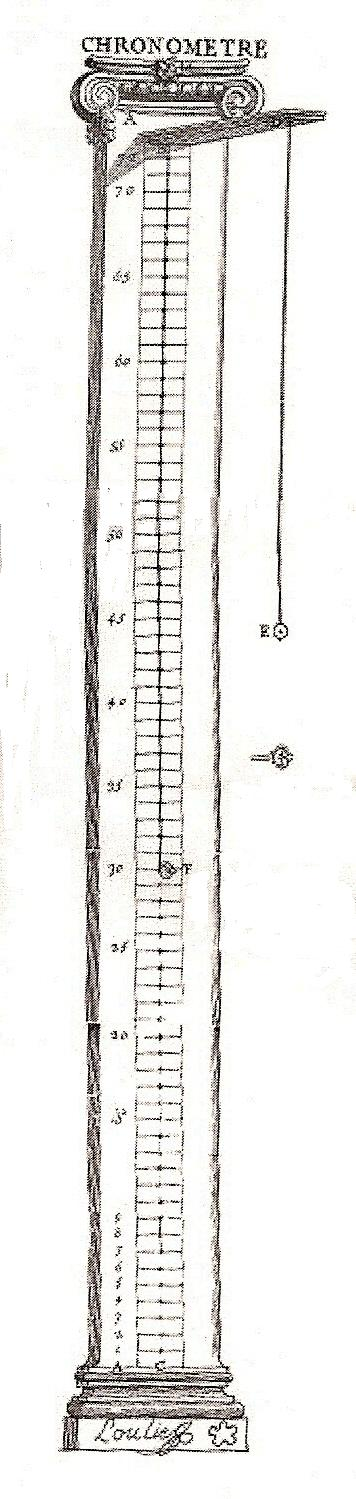
Loulié's chronomètre as shown in his Éléments (1696)

== The Device ==
Musician Étienne Loulié collaborated with mathematician Joseph Sauveur on the education of Philippe, Duke of Chartres, who subsequently asked the pair to work together on a scientific study of acoustics sponsored by the Royal Academy of Science circa 1694.

To measure scientifically the number of beats per second caused by different dissonances, they used the "seconds pendulum" invented by Galileo earlier in the century. It doubtlessly was these experiments, on top of his lessons to Chartres, that gave Loulié the idea for his chronomètre, a precursor of the metronome.

In his Éléments (Paris: Ballard, 1696) — which resumes the lessons Loulié had given to Chartres and is dedicated to the prince — Loulié described this invention, complete with an engraving of the device. (A translation of Loulié's description is provided below.)

The device is basically a Galilean seconds pendulum disguised as a classical column. It consists of a six-foot-tall vertical "ruler" marked off in inches, with a little peg-hole at every inch. From the right-angle bar that protrudes at the capital of the Ionic capital, hangs a string with a plumb bob at the end. The length of the string — and therefore the speed of the pendulum swings — can be adjusted by moving the peg at the other end of the string up and down the vertical board and inserting it in one peg-hole or another. The shorter the string, the more rapid the swings; the longer the string, the slower the swings.

To specify the tempo of a piece, the composer could henceforth test the tempo at a variety of peg holes and, having determined the right tempo, could mark at the top of a piece the note value that represented the musical beat, plus the number of the hole into which the peg had been inserted.

Sauveur subsequently criticized the device because it was measured in inches, which did not conform with any known relation to the duration of a second. His échomètre tried to remedy this shortcoming, by marking the vertical ruler with the small units that the Sauveur was creating for his Nouveau système. When Loulié died in 1702, Louis Léon Pajot, comte d'Onsenbray, acquired Loulié's model and presented his own variant (the métromètre) to the Academy of Sciences in 1732. It was measured in seconds and made the swings of the pendulum audible. The size of all three devices rendered them too cumbersome for widespread use.

== Its utility ==
On pages 85–86 of his Éléments, Loulié emphasized the usefulness of his device:

This instrument is especially suitable for marking the tempos of pieces being sent abroad, or to know the exact tempo of imported pieces, as long as they have been marked by this instrument.

A few years ago I gave a chronomètre to a person of great musical merit. I showed him how to use it. He took it with him to Italy, where he currently is. A musician who wanted to send that person a few sonatas he had written, and who was very happy to know that his airs would be executed as he intended, came to me not long ago and asked me to help him mark the tempo of his airs using the chronomètre. [...]

This instrument may not seem very necessary or even very useful.

First, there are those who, being savant and very experienced in both French and foreign music, are capable of judging their true tempo, or approximately so.

Second, those who are very familiar with the airs of Monsieur de Lully and other airs of this sort, neglect or even look down upon other types of music.

Third, those whose only musical merits are a certain routine, with no refinement of taste, think that it makes little difference whether an air is performed more quickly or more slowly.

But I flatter myself that those who have fine taste and who have observed how an air loses its beauty when executed too quickly or too slowly, will thank me for giving them a reliable way to determine the true tempo, especially people living in the provinces, who will be able to know the true tempo of all of Monsieur de Lully's works, which I have determined very accurately with the chronomètre, with the help of people who performed them for many years under the direction of Monsieur de Lully himself.

Loulié's allusions to the airs of Jean Baptiste de Lully are particularly meaningful within the broader context of Loulié's business activities. Loulié was directing a workshop that copied Lully's airs (usually in trio form), probably for sale by his friend Henri Foucault, the music-paper dealer and disseminator of Lully's works in both manuscript and print.

== Loulié's Description ==
Loulié's own description of the invention follows, translated from pp. 83–86 of his Éléments:

The chronomètre is an instrument by means of which composers will henceforth be able to mark the true tempo of their composition; and their airs, marked according to this instrument, will be able to be performed, in their absence, as if they themselves were beating time.

This instrument has only two parts:

The first is a wooden ruler (AA) that is six feet tall (or 72 inches), about two inches wide, and approximately an inch thick. On the flat side of the ruler a line (BC) is traced from top to bottom, down the very middle. Along this line are marked, very precisely, inch-long divisions, and wherever these [horizontal] lines cross the vertical line, there is a hole about 1/6 inch in diameter and 3/4 inches deep. These holes are indicated by numbers, beginning with the lowest all the way up to 72 at the top.

I used the universal foot [as a measurement] because it is known in all sorts of countries. [...]

At the top of the ruler, at a right angle, is an iron or wooden bar (BD) six or seven inches long, inserted into the ruler an inch above section 71. About six or seven inches from the end of the angle-bar is a little hole (D) about as big as a shoelace or thick cord. At the other end, where it is inserted into the ruler, is another hole (B) at the central vertical line.

The second part of this instrument is a pendulum, that is, a plumb-bob (E) approximately one inch in diameter, pierced through with a hole the size of a thick cord, and through this hole is passed the cord, knotted above the plumb-bob.

The cord and its plumb-bob are attached to the ruler by passing the cord through holes D and B in the angle-bar, so that one of the ends of the rope coincides with the central division line, and the other end, with the plumb-bob, hangs [pend] in the air, which is why it is called a pendulum.

At the other end of the cord, along the division line, is attached a wooden or iron peg (F) with the same diameter as the holes in the ruler, so that the peg just enters.

The peg is made a bit like the pegs on a lute or a viol: there is a hole between the part one grabs with one's hand, and the part that goes into the holes on the ruler. The cord goes through this hole and is knotted, so that when the peg is in hole 72, the cord is 72 inches long from the hole (D) to the center of the plumb-bob. By means of this peg that is attached to the cord, one can modify the length of the pendulum (or pendillon) as one wishes, by putting the peg into a higher or lower place. It is set into motion at the height of a quarter of a quarter of a circle, which is done by moving the plumb-bob two feet from perpendicular, or from its resting position, when the peg is in hole 72, or one foot when the peg is in hole 36, and six inches when the peg is in hole 18, and always a bit less as the pendulum becomes shorter. If one lets go of the plumb-bob without forcing it, the pendulum can mark with utmost precision the quickness or the slowness of the musical beat, as a result of the swings [vibrations] at its various lengths.

If a composer wants to mark the desired tempo for performing an air he has composed, irrespective of the time signature he must begin by putting the peg in one of the holes and then setting the pendulum in motion. If the swings are too slow, he must shorten the pendulum by putting the peg in a lower number. If the swings are too fast, he must lengthen the pendulum by putting the peg into a higher number, until he has found the tempo he wants.

When he has found the tempo that he wants to specify, he must write down the number of the hole where the peg is, above the time signature, with a musical note showing the value or duration of each swing.

If a composer wants to mark the desired tempo for performing an air he has composed, irrespective of the time signature he must begin by putting the peg in one of the holes and then setting the pendulum in motion. If the swings are too slow, he must shorten the pendulum by putting the peg in a lower number. If the swings are too fast, he must lengthen the pendulum by putting the peg into a higher number, until he has found the tempo he wants.

When he has found the tempo that he wants to specify, he must write down the number of the hole where the peg is, above the time signature, with a musical note showing the value or duration of each swing.
