= Société des observateurs de l'homme =

French learned society

Société des observateurs de l'homme, rendered in English as Society of Observers of Man, was a French learned society founded in Paris in 1799. Long considered the birthplace of French anthropology, the society nevertheless dissolved in 1804.

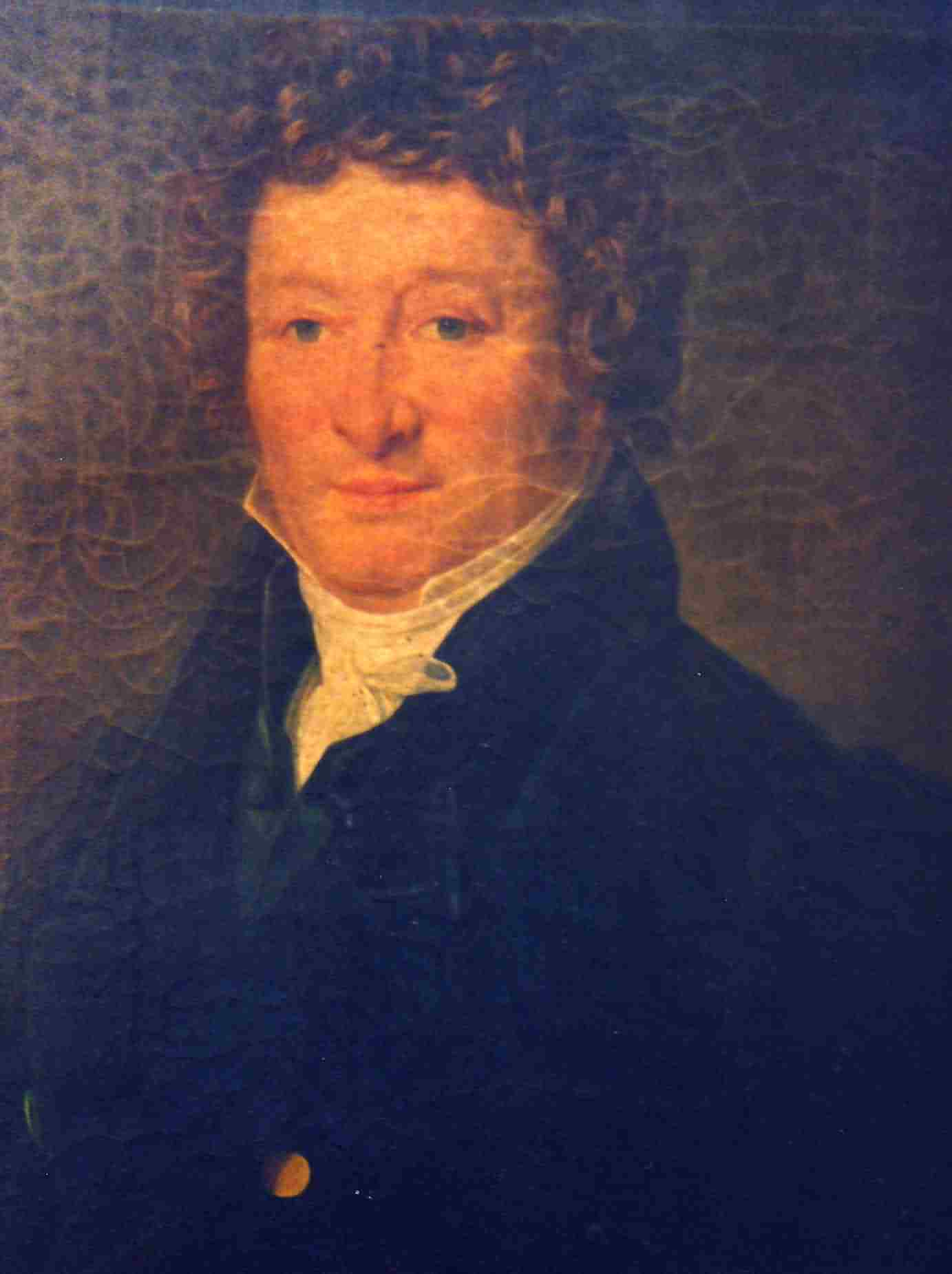
Louis-François Jauffret, founding member

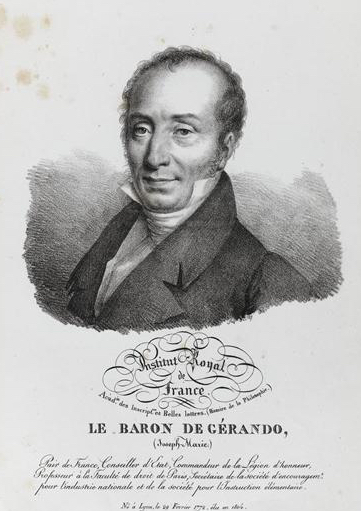
Joseph-Marie de Gérando

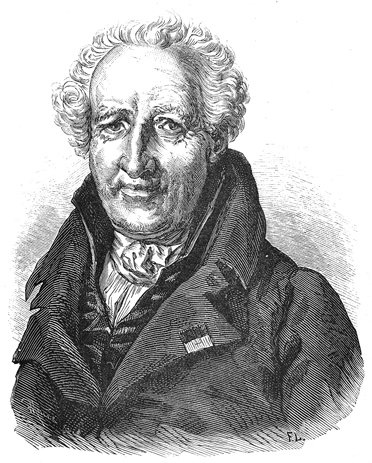
Antoine Laurent de Jussieu

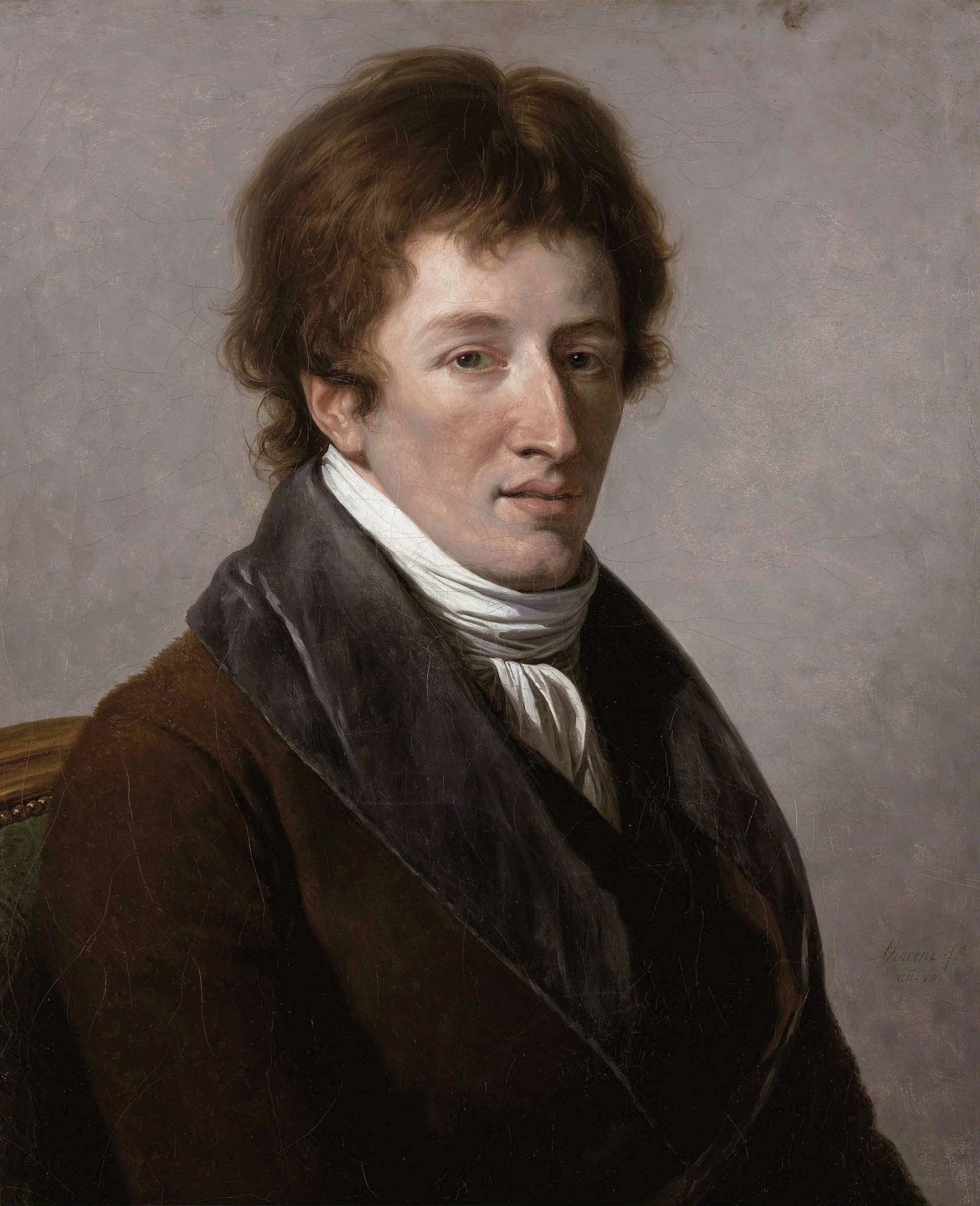
Georges Cuvier

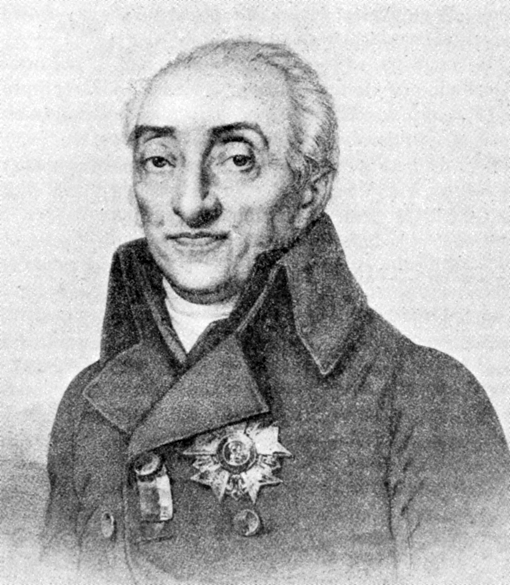
Bernard Germain de Lacépède

== History ==
The Société des observateurs de l'homme was founded on Christian principles by Roch-Ambroise Cucurron Sicard, Louis-François Jauffret and Joseph de Maimieux. The brevity of its existence and relative dearth of records provide scant history, but they did leave traces of their involvement with feral child Victor of Aveyron, as well as the Baudin expedition to Australia.

The Constitution of the Society was set at its inaugural meeting in the Rue de Seine, in August 1799. There they brought together naturalists, physicians (including psychiatrists), philosophers, writers, historians, linguists, orientalists, and archaeologists under the chairmanship of John de Maimieux. Louis-François Jauffret, at whose home they met, was named permanent secretary.

In 1800, the Society offered a 600 franc prize for the study of very young children with an eye toward discovering the extent to which their physical, intellectual, and moral faculties are supported or opposed by the influences of the objects and people in the child's environment.

Déterminer par l'observation journalière de un ou plusieurs enfants au berceau l'ordre dans lequel les facultés physiques, intellectuelles et morales se développent et jusqu'à quel point ce développement est secondé ou contrarié par l'influence des objets et des personnes qui environnent l'enfant.

The Society went silent in 1804, and was largely forgotten until the time of the French Third Republic, when Paul Broca of the Society of Anthropology of Paris cited the existence of the Observateurs in his claim that French anthropological societies predated those of Great Britain, which were then in ascendency.

== Membership ==
=== Resident Members ===
Pierre Bonnefous - Mathieu-Antoine Bouchaud - Louis Antoine de Bougainville - Antoine-Marie-Henri Boulard - Simon-Jérôme Bourlet de Vauxcelles - Pierre-Roland-François Butet de La Sarthe - Guillaume de Sainte-Croix - Adamance Coray - Frédéric Cuvier - Jean-Baptiste-Gaspard d'Ansse de Villoison - Joseph-Marie de Gérando - Joseph-Philippe-François Deleuze - Joseph de Maimieux - Déodat Gratet de Dolomieu - André Marie Constant Duméril - Antoine-François Fourcroy - Marie-Nicolas-Silvestre Guillon-Pastel - Jean Noël Hallé - Jean Itard - Gaspard-André Jauffret - Louis-François Jauffret - Antoine-Laurent de Jussieu - Bernard Germain de Lacépède - Pierre-Henri Larcher - Pierre Laromiguière - Auguste-Savinien Leblond - Théodoric-Nilammon Lerminier - Jean-Joseph Marcel - Aubin-Louis Millin de Grandmaison - Mathieu de Montmorency-Laval - Louis-Jacques Moreau de la Sarthe - Pierre-Henry Nysten (probably Pierre-Hubert Nysten) - Ambroise Marie François Joseph Palisot de Beauvois - Jean-Pierre Papon - Eugène Louis Melchior Patrin - Philippe Pinel - Joseph Marie Portalis - Louis Ramond de Carbonnières - Dominique Ricard - Roch-Ambroise Cucurron Sicard - Antoine-Isaac Silvestre de Sacy - Charles-Nicolas-Sigisbert Sonnini de Manoncourt - Charles Athanase Walckenaer

=== Corresponding Members ===
Nicolas Baudin - Pierre-Justin Bernier - Frédéric de Bissy - Ludwig Heinrich Bojanus - Hyacinthe de Bougainville - Jean Cailleau - Pierre Faure - Jean-Emmanuel Gilibert - Jacques Félix Emmanuel Hamelin - Urbain-René-Thomas Le Bouvier-Desmortiers - François Levaillant - René Maugé de Cely - André Michaux - François Péron - Gottlieb Konrad Pfeffel - Anselme Riedle

== Bibliography ==
- (in French) Jean Copans and Jean Jamin, Aux origines de l’anthropologie française, Paris, Le Sycomore, 1978.
- Jean-Luc Chappey, The ‘Société des Observateurs de l’homme’ and the history of French anthropology (1799–1804) How Napoléon Bonaparte ended the French Revolution online PDF
- Efram Sera-Shriar, The Making of British Anthropology, 1813-1871, London: Pickering & Chatto and Routledge, 2013, pp. 53-80.

== See also ==
- Institut de France
