= Auguste-Savinien Leblond =

French mathematician (1760–1811)

Auguste-Savinien Leblond d'Olblen
- Born: 19 October 1760
- Died: 22 February 1811 (aged 50)
- Scientific career
- Fields: Mathematics

Auguste-Savinien Leblond d'Olblen (19 October 1760 – 22 February 1811) was a French mathematician. In 1790, he coined the name metre for the unit of length.

== Life ==
Auguste-Savinien Leblond came from a family of mathematicians. It was the profession of his father, and above all his great-uncle Guillaume Le Blond, and he himself was a teacher of mathematics, while publishing works that earned him the esteem of his peers. He is remembered as the inventor of a fixed and universal measurement of length, which, in 1790, he named "the metre". Borda would adopt this name two years later. He also designed mechanical devices called "logarithmic dials", for converting traditional and metric measures, that were quickly abandoned in favour of slide rules

A member of the Lycée des Arts (School of Arts) and employed in the Prints Department of the Royal Library, the Bibliothèque Royale, he was particularly interested in what was known as "education through the eyes", the use of visual methods for teaching. This led to his collaboration with his friend, the botanist Antoine Nicolas Duchesne, a pioneer of entertaining education, on the forerunner of illustrated magazines, a popular work entitled Portefeuille des enfants (1783–1791), under the direction of Cochin.

== Honours ==
Member of the Société des observateurs de l'homme
