= Dominique Ricard =

Abbot Dominique Ricard (24 March 1741, Toulouse – 28 January 1803, Paris) was an 18th-century French translator.

Born in Toulouse, he was teacher of rhetorics at the college of Auxerre, then special tutor to Jérôme-Pélagie Masson de Meslay's son (president of the Chambre des comptes of Paris from 1768 to 1790), called président de Meslay.

We owe him a translation of the Works by Plutarch: the Moralia were published from 1783 to 1795, and the Vies des Hommes illustres from 1798 to 1803.

Dominique Ricard was a member of the Société des observateurs de l'homme.
