= Simon-Jérôme Bourlet de Vauxcelles =

French priest and journalist

Simon-Jérôme Bourlet, abbé de Vauxcelles (French: [buʁlɛ də vosɛl]; 11 August 1733 – 18 March 1802) was an 18th-century French priest and journalist during the French Revolution.

== Biography ==
Born in Versailles, he was a preacher of the king, canon of Noyon, reader for the Comte d'Artois, curator of the bibliothèque de l'Arsenal (1787), abbot of Massay.

He preached successfully and worked, among others, at the Mercure de France, and the Journal de Paris. Like others, he was a victim of the repressive policies of the French Directory against journalists, and a decree dated 17 January (28 Nivose) an VII ordered his deportation to Oléron.

We have some eulogies and some funeral orations by him, but he is best known for his edition of the Lettres de Mme de Sévigné, Paris, 1801, 10 volumes in-12°.

He participated in the proofreading of the fifth edition of the Dictionnaire de l'Académie Française (1798).

A resident member of the Société des observateurs de l'homme, he also translated Dialogues on Medals (De l'allégorie, ou Traités sur cette matière) by Joseph Addison.

Bourlet de Vauxcelles died in Paris.

== Works ==
- Oraison funèbre de Louis XV [...] - A Paris : chez Saugrain, 1774 [Bibliothèque de la SHAS, Senlis]
