= Louis-François Jauffret =

French educator, poet and fabulist

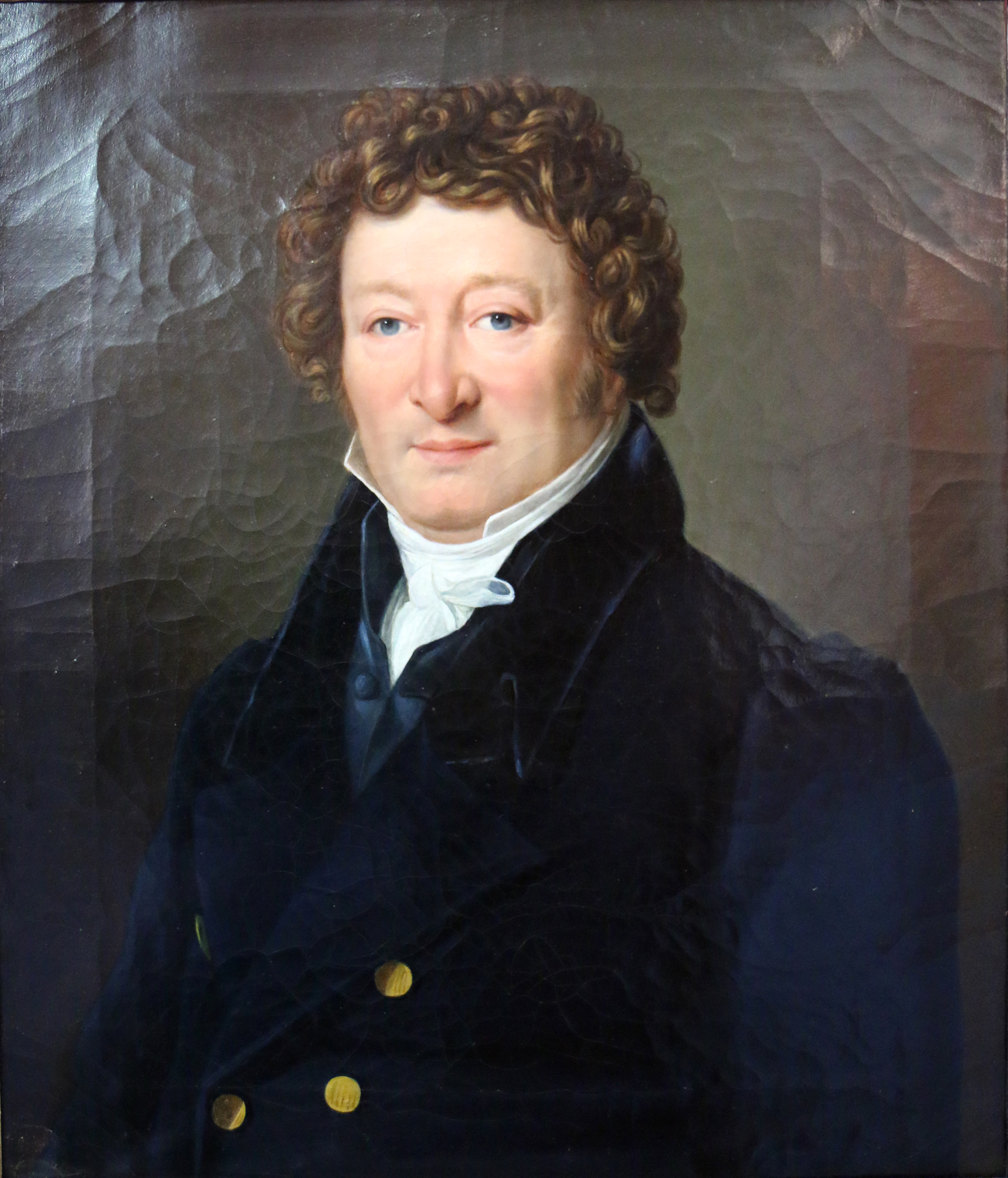
- Louis-Francois Jauffret
- Born: 4 October 1770; La Roquebrussanne (Provence), France
- Died: 11 December 1840 (aged 70); Marseille, France
- Occupations: Educator; Poet
- Spouse: Dorothée de Ferry-Lacombe

Louis-François Jauffret (4 October 1770 – 11 December 1840) was an 18th–19th-century French educator, poet and fabulist. Gaspard-André Jauffret, bishop of Metz, Jean-Baptiste Jauffret, director of the imperial institution of the deaf in St. Petersburg and Joseph Jauffret, master of requests to the Conseil d'État, were his brothers.

== Works ==
Journalism

- Gazette des tribunaux, 1791-1793
- Histoire impartiale du procès de Louis XVI, ci-devant roi des Français 1798

Fables

- 1791: Les charmes de l'enfance et les plaisirs de l'amour maternel, (Paris, Eymery)
- 1795: Romances historiques
- 1802: Œuvres de Berquin
- 1803: Œuvres posthumes by Florian
- 1804: Le taureau, (Paris, Demoraine)
- 1814: Fables nouvelles dédiées à SAR la duchesse d'Angoulême, (Paris, Maradan)
- 1826: Lettres sur les fabulistes anciens et modernes, (Paris, Pichon-Béchet)
- 1827: Trois fables sur la girafe, with a lithograph of a giraffe, a note on this animal and a Latin translation of the first fable by M. Adolphe Jauffret, (Marseille et Paris, Pichon-Béchet)

Books for youth

- 1796–1799: Le courrier des enfants, (Paris, Leclère)
- 1797: Petit théâtre de famille
- 1799: Les Merveilles du corps humain, from anatomical drawings provided by Cuvier, (Paris, Leclère)
- 1799: Dictionnaire étymologique de la langue française à l'usage de la jeunesse
- 1798: Voyage au jardin des plantes, containing the description of the natural history galleries, and greenhouses where foreign shrubs are housed (on the advice of Jussieu) (Paris, Guillaume)
- 1799: Voyages de Rolando et de ses compagnons de fortune autour du monde, (Paris, Leclère)
- 1800–1801: Le courrier des adolescents, (Paris, Leclère)
- 1803: La gymnastique de la jeunesse
- 1803: Promenades de Jauffret à la campagne faites dans le dessein de donner aux jeunes gens une idée du bonheur qui peut résulter pour l'homme de l'étude de lui-même et de la contemplation de la nature, (Paris, Demoraine)
- La journée ou l'emploi du temps, ouvrage contenant les premiers éléments de connaissances utiles aux enfants qui commencent à lire
- 1805: Les six jours ou leçons d'un père à son fils sur l'origine du monde, d'après la Bible, contenant des notions simples sur l'histoire naturelle des minéraux, des végétaux, des animaux et de l'homme, (Paris, Galland)
- 1806–1807: La corbeille de fleurs et le panier de fruits, ou la récolte de chaque mois offerte aux demoiselles, (Paris, Perlet)
- Le Panier de fruits
- 1806: Éducation pratique d'Adolphe et Gustave, ou recueil des leçons donné par L. Jauffret à ses enfants, (Lyon, Ballanche)
- 1806: Géographie dramatique de la jeunesse, ou nouvelle méthode amusante pour apprendre la géographie, mises en dialogues et scènes propres à être représentées dans les pensionnats et dans les familles
- 1807: Le Molière de la jeunesse ou comédies choisies de Molière, (Paris, Nyon)
- 1816: Petite école des arts et métiers, (Paris, Eymery)

Other

- 1796: Projet d'établir en France une manufacture de végétaux artificiels qui doit occuper utilement dans l'enceinte de Paris environ 4000 femmes d'après les nouveaux procédés de T.J. Wenzel
- 1799: Jeux zoologiques et géographiques (Paris, Leclère)
- 1804: Éléments de zoographie, ou l'histoire des animaux considérés relativement au degré d'étendue des régions que chaque espèce occupe sur la surface du globe, (Paris, Demoraine)
- Pièces historiques sur la peste de Marseille et d'une partie de la Provence en 1720,1721 et 1722.
- L'art épistolaire, Paroles mémorables des grands hommes de l'antiquité et des temps modernes (written with his brother Gaspard-André Jauffret)

== Bibliography ==
- Robert Reboul: Louis-François Jauffret, sa vie, ses œuvres, 1869 on Gallica
- Robert Reboul: Les Cartons d'un bibliothécaire de Marseille, 1875
- Jean-Luc Chappey: La Société des observateurs de l'homme, 2002
- Adriana S. Benzaquén: Childhood, Identity and Human Science in the Enlightenment, in History Workshop Journal, 2004
- Cynthia J. Koepp: Dialogues and Dramas for Children: The Enlightened Pedagogy of Louis-François Jauffret, The Faculty of Education, University of Cambridge (Friday September 9, 2005)

== See also ==
- Société des observateurs de l'homme
