= Saint-Rémy, Calvados =

Saint-Rémy
- Commune
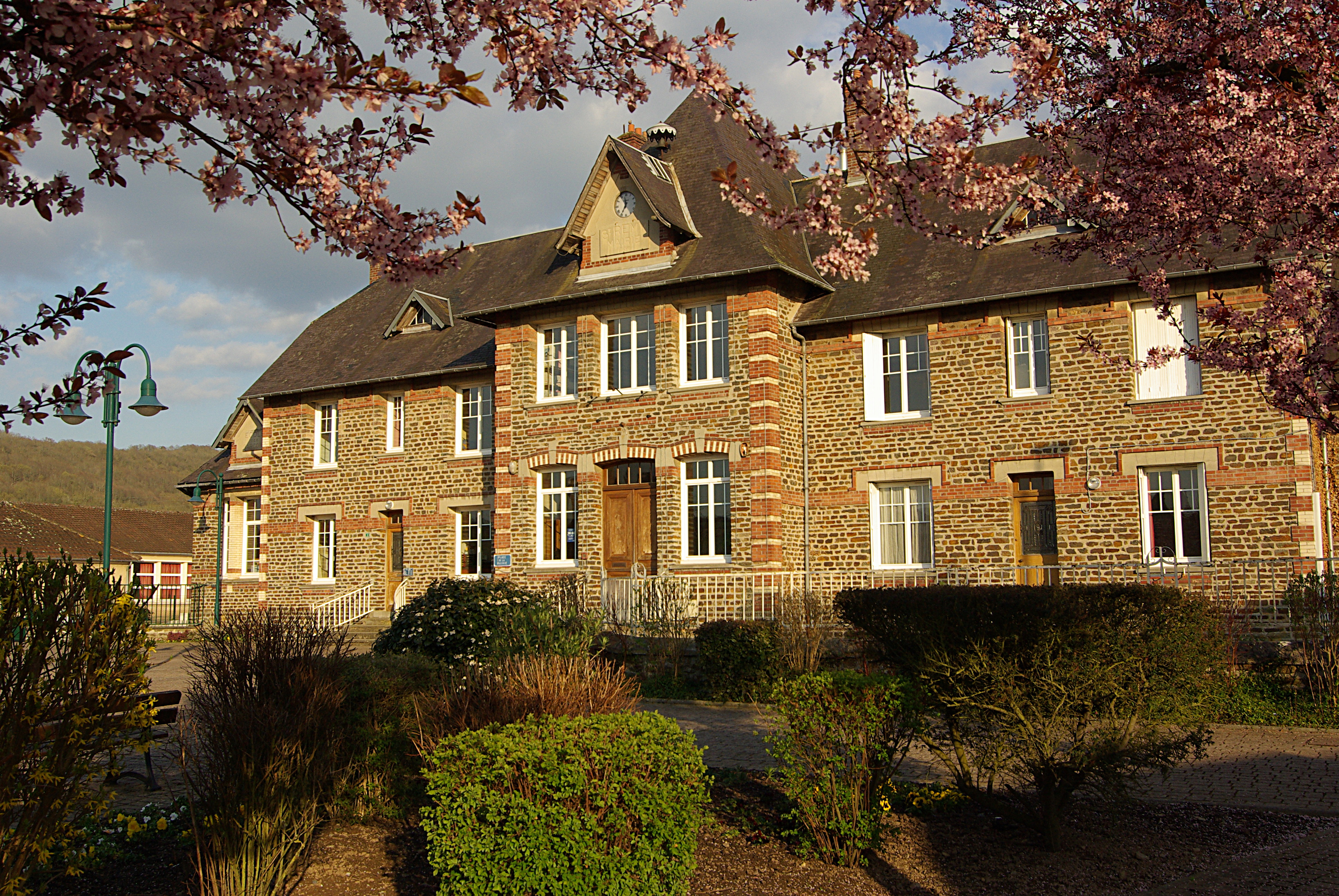
- Town hall
- Location of Saint-Rémy
- Location within France Location within Normandy
- Coordinates: 48°56′27″N 0°30′08″W
- Country: France
- Region: Normandy
- Department: Calvados
- Arrondissement: Caen
- Canton: Le Hom
- Intercommunality: Cingal-Suisse Normande

Government
  - Mayor (2020–2026): Serge Ladan
- Area^{1}: 7.52 km^{2} (2.90 sq mi)
- Elevation: 37 m (121 ft)
- Highest elevation: 216 m (709 ft)
- Lowest elevation: 26 m (85 ft)
- Population (2023): 996
  - Density: 132/km^{2} (343/sq mi)
- Time zone: UTC+01:00 (CET)
  - Summer (DST): UTC+02:00 (CEST)
- INSEE/Postal code: 14656 /14570
- ^{1} French Land Register data, which excludes lakes, ponds, glaciers > 1 km^{2} (0.386 sq mi or 247 acres) and river estuaries.

Saint Rémy (French pronunciation: [sɛ̃ ʁemi]) is a commune in the Calvados department in the Normandy region in northwestern France. Until 1968 an iron mine was exploited in the village.

== Geography ==
The commune is part of the area known as Suisse Normande.

The commune is made up of the following collection of villages and hamlets, Le Pont de la Moussé, Nid de Chien, La Gennière, La Piventière, La Moussé, La Muloisière, L'Église, La Vallée and Saint-Rémy.

The Commune with another 20 communes shares part of a 2,115 hectare, Natura 2000 conservation area, called the Vallée de l'Orne et ses affluents.

The river Orne plus five streams, The Herbion, La Porte, La Vallee des Vaux, La Vignonniere and The Val Fournet are the six watercourses running through the commune.

== Population ==
Historical population
Year	Pop.	±% p.a.
1968	981	—
1975	1,012	+0.45%
1982	969	−0.62%
1990	993	+0.31%
1999	1,066	+0.79%
2007	1,077	+0.13%
2012	1,063	−0.26%
2017	1,001	−1.19%
2023	996	−0.08%
Source: INSEE

== Points of interest ==
=== National heritage sites ===
- Saint-Rémy Church is a twelfth century church, that was listed as a Monument historique in 1933.

== Notable people ==
- Pierre Surirey de Saint-Remy (1645–1716) a French general was born here.

== See also ==
- Communes of the Calvados department
