= Joseph de Maimieux =

French linguist/writer (1753–1820)

Joseph de Maimieux (1753–1820), was a French noble who had emigrated to the Holy Roman Empire at the time of the Revolution, who returned to France in 1797. He invented a kind of universal language system which he revealed in Pasigraphie ou Premiers éléments du nouvel art-science, d’écrire et d’imprimer en une langue, de manière à être lu et entendu dans toute autre langue sans traduction… (Paris, 1797), completed by Pasigraphie et pasilalie, (Paris, an VIII) and Carte générale pasigraphique (1808).

According to Hoefer in his Nouvelle Biographie Générale, he may have helped general Firmas-Périés to write his Pasitélégraphie. Joseph de Maimieux was a member of the Société des observateurs de l'homme.

== Selected works ==
- 1788: Éloge philosophique de l'impertinence
- 1797: Pasigraphie ou Premiers éléments du nouvel art-science, d’écrire et d’imprimer en une langue, de manière à être lu et entendu dans toute autre langue sans traduction…
- 1799: Pasigraphie et pasilalie, (Paris, an VIII)
- 1802: Épître familière au sens commun sur la pasigraphie et la pasilalie
- 1803: Propylée
- 1808: Carte générale pasigraphique.
- 1811: Céleste Paléologue, roman historique, traduit du grec

== Sources ==
- Ferdinand Hoefer. Nouvelle biographie générale, Paris, Didot, vol. 32, col. 893-894.
