= Cordemoy (surname) =

Cordemoy is a surname. Notable people with the surname include:

- Jean-Louis de Cordemoy (1655–1714), French architectural historian
- Géraud de Cordemoy (1626–1684), French philosopher, historian, and lawyer
- Eugène Jacob de Cordemoy, French physician and botanist of the nineteenth century
