= Isothermal transformation diagram =

Temperature graphs plotted against time

Time-Temperature-Transformation diagram for two steels: one with 0.4% wt. C (red line) and one with 0.4% wt. C and 2% weight Mn (green line). P = pearlite, B = bainite and M = martensite.

Isothermal transformation diagrams (also known as time-temperature-transformation (TTT) diagrams) are plots of temperature versus time (usually on a logarithmic scale). They are generated from percentage transformation-vs time measurements, and are useful for understanding the transformations of an alloy steel at elevated temperatures.

An isothermal transformation diagram is only valid for one specific composition of material, and only if the temperature is held constant during the transformation, and strictly with rapid cooling to that temperature. Though usually used to represent transformation kinetics for steels, they also can be used to describe the kinetics of crystallization in ceramic or other materials. Time-temperature-precipitation diagrams and time-temperature-embrittlement diagrams have also been used to represent kinetic changes in steels.

Isothermal transformation (IT) diagram or the C-curve is associated with mechanical properties, microconstituents/microstructures, and heat treatments in carbon steels. Diffusional transformations like austenite transforming to a cementite and ferrite mixture can be explained using the sigmoidal curve; for example the beginning of pearlitic transformation is represented by the pearlite start (P_{s}) curve. This transformation is complete at P_{f} curve. Nucleation requires an incubation time. The rate of nucleation increases and the rate of microconstituent growth decreases as the temperature decreases from the liquidus temperature reaching a maximum at the bay or nose of the curve. Thereafter, the decrease in diffusion rate due to low temperature offsets the effect of increased driving force due to greater difference in free energy. As a result of the transformation, the microconstituents, pearlite and bainite, form; pearlite forms at higher temperatures and bainite at lower.

TTT diagram of isothermal transformations of a hypoeutectoid carbon steel; showing the main components obtained when cooling the steel and its relation with the Fe-C phase diagram of carbon steels.

Austenite is slightly undercooled when quenched below Eutectoid temperature. When given more time, stable microconstituents can form: ferrite and cementite. Coarse pearlite is produced when atoms diffuse rapidly after phases that form pearlite nucleate. This transformation is complete at the pearlite finish time (P_{f}).

However, greater undercooling by rapid quenching results in formation of martensite or bainite instead of pearlite. This is possible provided the cooling rate is such that the cooling curve intersects the martensite start temperature or the bainite start curve before intersecting the P_{s}curve. The martensite transformation being a diffusionless shear transformation is represented by a straight line to signify the martensite start temperature.

== See also ==
- Continuous cooling transformation
- Phase diagram
