= Étienne Loulié =

Étienne Loulié (French: [etjɛn lulje]; 1654 – 16 July 1702) was a musician, pedagogue, and musical theorist.

== Life ==
Born into a family of Parisian sword-finishers, Loulié learned both musical practice and musical theory as a choir boy at the Sainte-Chapelle of Paris, under the learned maître de musique René Ouvrard. In 1673 Loulié left the Chapel and entered the service of Marie de Lorraine, duchesse de Guise, as an instrumentalist (harpsichord, and organ, viol, recorder and perhaps transverse flute as well), performing chiefly in her household ensemble. From 1673 to late 1687, he therefore performed many of the compositions of Marc-Antoine Charpentier, the Guises' household composer. During the late 1680s, Loulié became involved in musical pedagogy and wrote a series of coordinated method books for music teachers. He is credited with introducing the six-fold system of meter classification still taught today. During these same years, he formed a lifelong friendship with Sébastien de Brossard, who became a famed collector of musical scores and preserved Louliè's papers by including them in his donation to the Royal Library (today, the Bibliothèque nationale de France).

The Duchesse de Guise died in 1688. From that date until 1691, Loulié collaborated with mathematician Joseph Sauveur to prepare a course of study for Philippe II, Duke of Orléans, at the time known as the "Duke of Chartres."

One of the few musicians of the day who knew thoroughly both the practice and the theory of music, Loulié worked with Sauveur (circa 1693-1699) under the aegis of the French Academy of Sciences, studying acoustics and working out a "new system" of tuning and musical notation. The collaborative venture ended when Loulié and the musicians working with him became exasperated with the minute units upon which Sauveur based his system and which, the musicians insisted, could neither be heard nor replicated by even the sharpest human ear and the best-trained voice.

An admirer of Jean-Baptiste Lully, Loulié allied with Henri Foucault, a music seller, to copy Lully's works and disseminate them in manuscript (circa 1691-1702). The son and brother of craftsmen, Loulié invented several devices during the 1690s: a device for tracing music staves on paper, a metronome-like chronomètre based on the Galilean seconds pendulum and a sonomètre for tuning harpsichords that used the monochord as a point of departure. The first of these devices clearly was prompted by his copying business; the latter two inventions appear to have been inspired by his work with Chartres and Sauveur. All three devices received the approbation of the French Académie des Sciences, and in 1699 Loulié personally presented his sonomètre before that august body.

Loulié's contacts with René Ouvrard and with collector François Roger de Gaignières of the Hôtel de Guise, and his collaboration with Joseph Sauveur, stirred Loulié's curiosity about "ancient" music (la musique ancienne). He eventually broke with Sauveur over the utility of theory for practicing musicians, and he spent his final years as a historian of musical practice.

Loulié strove to reconcile theory with the musical practices of the 1690s, and to do so as succinctly as possible. His manuscripts reveal a researcher who was very familiar with the writings of Marin Mersenne and of musical theorists who flourished prior to 1600. In his personal quarrel of the Ancients and the Moderns, Loulié took the position of a "Modern."

== Writings ==
- Éléments ou Principes de musique mis dans un nouvel ordre (Paris, 1696), a handbook on musical notation
- Abrégé des principes de musique, avec leçons sur chaque difficulté de ces mesmes principes (Paris 1696), a simplified handbook on musical notation
- Nouveau sistème de musique ou nouvelle division du monocorde [...] avec la description et l'usage du sonomètre (Paris, 1698), a facet of Loulié's work with Joseph Sauveur and the "new system" of music that he was working out.
- A variety of manuscript pedagogical treatises and methods on elementary composition, solfège, and how to play the viol and the recorder, plus a history of music (Bibliothèque nationale de France, ms. n.a. fr. 6355)
- An incomplete "discourse" on the history of "ancient" music (Bibliothèque royale, Brussels)

== Bibliography ==
- Patricia M. Ranum, "Le Musicien tailleur: Étienne Loulié et la musique des Anciens," in D'un Siècle à l'autre: Anciens et Modernes, acts of 16th colloquium of the C.M.R. 17, Jan. 1986), Marseilles, pp. 239–258
- Patricia M. Ranum, "A sweet servitude, A musician's life at the court of Mlle de Guise," Early Music, 15 (1987), pp. 347–360
- Patricia M. Ranum, "Etienne Loulié (1654-1702), musicien de Mademoiselle de Guise, pédagogue et théoricien," Recherches sur la Musique française classique, 23 (1987), pp. 27–76, and 24 (1988–1990), pp. 5–49
- Patricia M. Ranum, " 'M^{r} de Lully en trio': Etienne Loulié, the Foucaults, and the Transcription of the Works of Jean-Baptiste Lully (1673-1702), in Jean-Baptiste Lully, ed. J. de La Gorce and H. Schneider (Laaber: Laber, 1990), pp. 309-330
- Patricia M. Ranum, "Etienne Loulié: Recorder Player, Teacher, Musicologist," American Recorder, 32 (1991), pp. 6–11
- Patricia M. Ranum, "Le Musicien Tailleur: Étienne Loulié et la musique des Anciens," in Louise Godard de Donville, ed., D'un Siècle à l'autre: Anciens et Modernes (Marseille, 1987), pp. 239–59 (on Loulié's collaboration and dispute with Joseph Sauveur)
- Patricia M. Ranum, Portraits around Marc-Antoine Charpentier (Baltimore, 2004), pp. 189–201
- For the Guise musicians, see http://www.ranumspanat.com/guise_music.html
- Albert Cohen, Music in the French Royal Academy of Sciences (Princeton: Princeton University Press, 1981), and especially pp. 20, 49, 68, 120 for Loulié
- Albert Cohen, "Etienne Loulie as a Music Theorist," Journal of the American Musicological Society, 18 (1965), pp. 70–72
- Richard Semmens, "Étienne Loulié and the New Harmonic Counterpoint," Journal of Music Theory, 28 (1984), pp. 73–88
- Richard Semmens, "Étienne Loulié as Music Theorist: An Analysis of Ms. Paris, fonds fr. n.a. 6355," Ph.D. dissertation, Stanford Univ., 1980
- For the original article approving Loulié's sonomètre (albeit with an incomplete scan of the device itself), see pp. 187 and 189 of Google Books scan of Machines approuvées par l'Académie royale des Sciences

/18th_century_precursors_of_the_metronome
