= Joseph Sauveur =

French mathematician and physicist (1653-1716)

Joseph Sauveur (French pronunciation: [ʒozɛf sovœʁ]; 24 March 1653 – 9 July 1716) was a French mathematician and physicist. He was a professor of mathematics and in 1696 became a member of the French Academy of Sciences.

== Life ==
Joseph Sauveur was born in La Flèche, Maine (province), the son of a provincial notary. Despite a hearing and speech impairment that kept him totally mute until he was seven, Joseph benefited from a fine education at the Jesuit College of La Flèche. At seventeen, his uncle agreed to finance his studies in philosophy and theology at Paris. Joseph, however, discovered Euclid and turned to anatomy and botany. He soon met Cordemoy, reader to the son of Louis XIV; and Cordemoy soon sang his praises to Bossuet, preceptor to the Dauphin. Despite his handicap, Joseph promptly began teaching mathematics to the Dauphine's pages and also to a number of princes, among them Eugene of Savoy. By 1680, he was something of a pet at court, where he gave anatomy courses to courtiers and calculated for them the odds in the game called "basset."

In 1681, Sauveur did the mathematical calculations for a waterworks project for the "Grand Condé's" estate at Chantilly, working with Edmé Mariotte, the "father of French hydraulics. Condé became very fond of Sauveur and severely reprimanded anyone who laughed at the mathematician's speech impairment. Condé would invite Saveur to stay at Chantilly. It was there that Sauveur did his work on hydrostatics.

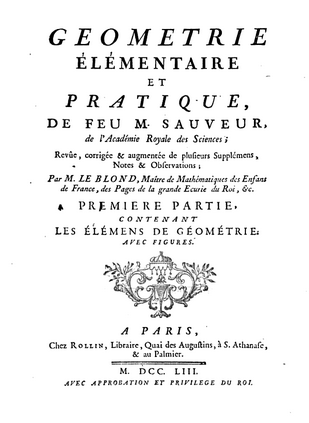
Frontpage of Geometrie élémentaire et pratique (1753) by Joseph Sauveur, edited and augmented by Guillaume Le Blond

During the summer of 1689, Sauveur was chosen to be the science and mathematics teacher for the Duke of Chartres, Louis XIV's nephew. For the prince, he drew up a manuscript outlining the "elements" of geometry and, in collaboration with Marshal Vauban, a manuscript on the "elements of military fortification." (In 1691 Sauveur and Chartres were present at the siege of Mons by the French.) Another of the prince's teachers was Étienne Loulié, a musician engaged to teach him the "elements" of musical theory and notation. Loulié and Sauveur joined forces to show the prince how mathematics and musical theory were inter-related. Remnants of this joint course have survived in Sauveur's manuscript treatise on the theory of music, and in Loulié's Éléments. In the years that followed, Sauveur taught mathematics to various princes of the royal family. In 1686 he obtained the mathematics chair at the Collège de France, which granted him a rare exemption: since he was incapable of reciting a speech from memory, he was permitted to read his inaugural lecture.

Circa 1694, Sauveur began working with Loulié on "the science of sound", that is, acoustics. As Fontenelle put it, Sauveur laid out a vast plan that amounted to the "discovery of an unknown country", and that created for him a "personal empire", the study of "acoustical sound" (le son acoustique). But, as Fontenelle pointed out, "He had neither a voice nor hearing, yet he could think only of music. He was reduced to borrowing the voice and the ear of someone else. and in return he gave hitherto unknown demonstrations to musicians." The Duke of Chartres did everything he could to make the undertaking successful. Sauveur's work, continued Fontenelle, resulted in "a new musical language that was more convenient and more broad, a new system of sounds, an unusual monochord, and échomètre, fixed sound [le son fixe, that is, absolute frequency], the nodes of undulating strings. [...] This pushed him all the way to the music of the ancient Greeks and Romans, the Arabs, the Turks and the Persians."

Sauveur is known principally for his detailed studies on acoustics. Indeed, he has been credited with coining the term acoustique, which he derived from the ancient Greek word ακουστός, meaning "able to be heard". His work involved researching the correlation between frequency and musical pitch, and – putting Fontenelle's statements in modern terms – he conducted studies on subjects such as the vibrating string, tuning pitch, harmonics, ranges of voices and musical instruments, et al. He also created a measure of intervals concerning the octave. Though Marin Mersenne's 1637 theories are correct, his measurements are not very exact, and his calculation of Mersenne's laws was greatly improved by Sauveur through the use of acoustic beats and metronomes. The following are some of the terms Sauveur used as logarithmic divisions:

- méride: 1/43 part of an octave
- eptaméride (or heptaméride): 1/301 part of an octave, or 1/7 of a méride; this term would later be known as a savart.
- demi-heptaméride: 1/602 part of an octave; 1/2 of an eptaméride.
- decaméride: 1/3010 part of an octave; 1/10 of an eptaméride
- Also 1/55 of an octave would become known as a "Sauveur comma".

Sauveur performed an accurate measurement of the frequency of various musical notes. He began by finding two organ pipes that, when sounded together, produced an acoustic beat of 6 times a second. Since the two pipes were measured to have a length ratio of 15:16, he concluded that the lower note had a frequency of 90 Hz, and the higher note 96 Hz. He then applied the same technique upwards to measure the frequency of many other musical notes.

In 1696, Sauveur had been elected to the French Royal Academy of Sciences and most of his work on acoustics was therefore done under its aegis. He soon ran into what proved to be an insurmountable obstacle: the musicians who were serving as his ears and voices had become exasperated at the mathematician's insistence upon using those new measuring units, arguing that they were simply too small for the human ear to distinguish and the human voice to replicate. Furthermore, they did not like the equal tuning he was proposing for instruments, nor the pa, ra, ga, so, bo, and so forth that were supposed to replace the familiar ut, re, mi, fa, sol.... (Sauveur had broken the octave into 3,010 parts.) A break took place circa 1699, and Sauveur had difficulty completing some of his experiments. Actually, Loulié had begun going his own way by 1698, when he published a little book called the Nouveau Sistème, which presents his work with Saveur from a musician's perspective. Loulié's surviving manuscripts round out the musician's contributions to Sauveur's project.

It was not until 1701 that Sauveur presented the results of his research to the Academy. The presentation was studded with jibes about musicians and their closed minds. In this same presentation, he rightly criticized Loulié's practical inventions as insufficiently scientific. In 1696, Loulié had published a description of a metronome-like instrument called the "chronomètre", which Loulié had invented with practicing musicians in mind. Now, in 1701, Sauveur focused on the shortcomings of his former colleague's device, compared with his own échomètre: Loulié's invention was not based on the second, and the swings of the pendulum were not related to one specific note value. In that same presentation before the Academy, Sauveur presented his own monocorde for tuning harpsichords (it was based on an octave divided into equal units composed of the tiny, precise units of his "new system"); and he contrasted his invention with Loulié's sonomètre, approved by the Academy in 1699, which replicated the unequal intervals actually being used in France.

Sauveur, whom a contemporary described as "over-obliging, gentle, and humorless", was declared a "pensioned veteran" of the Academy in on March 4, 1699. He died in Paris in 1716.

== See also ==
- Magic square
- Mersenne's laws
- Sauveur pitch
