= Metronome =

Device that produces a sound at a regular interval

A wind-up mechanical metronome, Nikko model, clicking at 96 BPM

A metronome (from Ancient Greek μέτρον (métron) 'measure' and νόμος (nómos) 'law') is a device that produces an audible click or other sound at a uniform interval that can be set by the user, typically in beats per minute (BPM). Metronomes may also include synchronized visual motion, such as a swinging pendulum or a blinking light. Musicians—and others including dancers, athletes, and health professionals—often practise with a metronome to improve their timing, especially the ability to maintain a steady tempo with a regular beat or pulse. Composers and conductors often use numerical metronome markings to communicate their preferred tempos to musicians preparing for a performance.

A type of metronome was among the inventions of the Andalusian polymath Abbas ibn Firnas (c. 810–887). In 1815, the German inventor Johann Maelzel patented a mechanical, wind-up metronome as a tool for musicians, under the title "Instrument/Machine for the Improvement of all Musical Performance, called Metronome". In the 20th century, electronic metronomes and software metronomes were invented.

When interpreting emotion and other qualities in music, performers seldom play exactly on every beat. In a musically expressive performance, the pulse generally does not align with the clicks of a metronome. This has led some musicians to criticize use of a metronome, because "musical time is replaced by clock time".

== Etymology ==
The word metronome first appeared in English in Maelzel's 1815 patent application, and is Greek in origin, derived from metron—"measure" and nomos—"regulation, law". The London patent refers to the machine as "a metronome or musical time-keeper".

== History and types ==
=== Mechanical metronomes ===
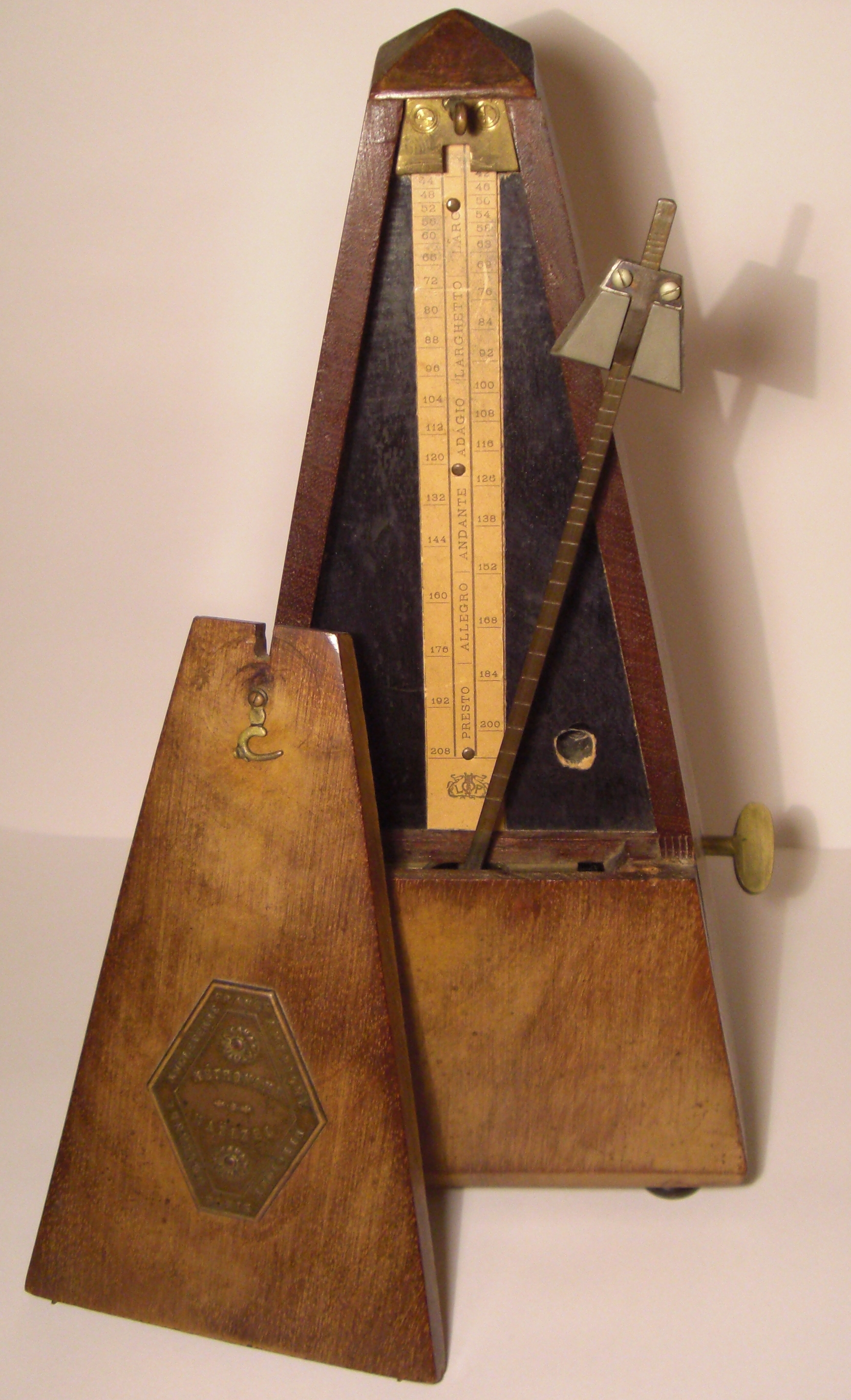
Maelzel's Metronome

Historical credit for the mechanical metronome is spread across Spanish, Italian, French, Dutch and German contributors.

According to the historian Lynn Townsend White Jr., the Andalusian inventor Abbas Ibn Firnas created "some sort of metronome" in the 9th century. Galileo Galilei studied and discovered key concepts involving the pendulum in the late 16th and early 17th centuries, famously inspired by a steadily swaying chandelier in Pisa Cathedral. In 1696, musician Étienne Loulié built a pendulum-based "chronomètre", consisting of a lead weight hanging from an adjustable string alongside a 6-foot (2 m) vertical ruler. However, his design produced no sound, and did not have an escapement mechanism to keep the pendulum in motion. To get the correct tempo with this type of visual device, a musician would need to watch the pendulum as if watching a conductor's baton.

The more familiar mechanical musical chronometre was invented by Dietrich Nikolaus Winkel in Amsterdam in 1814, based on a spring-powered, inverted pendulum rod with fixed and adjustable weights to achieve compactness. Through questionable practice, Johann Maelzel, incorporating Winkel's ideas, added a numerical scale, called it a metronome, and started mass-manufacturing the pyramid-shaped device in 1816 under his own name: "Maelzel's Metronome." The original text of Maelzel's patent in England (1815) can be downloaded.

Maelzel's mechanical metronome uses an adjustable weight on an inverted pendulum rod to control tempo. The weight slides up the pendulum rod to decrease tempo, or down to increase tempo. (This mechanism is also called a double-weighted pendulum, because there is a second, fixed weight on the other side of the pendulum pivot, inside the metronome case.) The pendulum swings back and forth in tempo, while a mechanism inside the metronome produces a clicking sound with each oscillation. A mechanical metronome does not need an electric battery, but runs from a spring-wound clockwork escapement. For uniform beats, the metronome should be placed on a hard, level, unmoving surface, and away from any strong magnets. Small variations in pendulum speed can also result from differences in temperature, air pressure, or gravity.

Since Maelzel's era, musical tempo is almost always measured in beats per minute (BPM). Metronomes often display both BPM numbers and traditional tempo markings, which are written words conveying a range of tempos and an associated character. For example, the Italian term Vivace indicates a tempo typically between 156 and 176 BPM, but it also communicates that the music should be played with a lively character.

A mechanical metronome's tempo is usually adjustable from 40 to 208 BPM. The most common arrangement of tempos on a Maelzel metronome begins with 40 beats per minute and increases by 2 BPM: 42 44 46 48 50 52 54 56 58 60, then by 3 BPM: 63 66 69 72, then by 4 BPM: 76 80 84 88 92 96 100 104 108 112 116 120, then by 6 BPM: 126 132 138 144, then by 8 BPM: 152 160 168 176 184 192 200 208. Some modern metronomes allow adjustment to more precise tempos (e.g., increasing 120 to 121), but such a difference is hardly perceptible.

=== Electromechanical metronomes ===
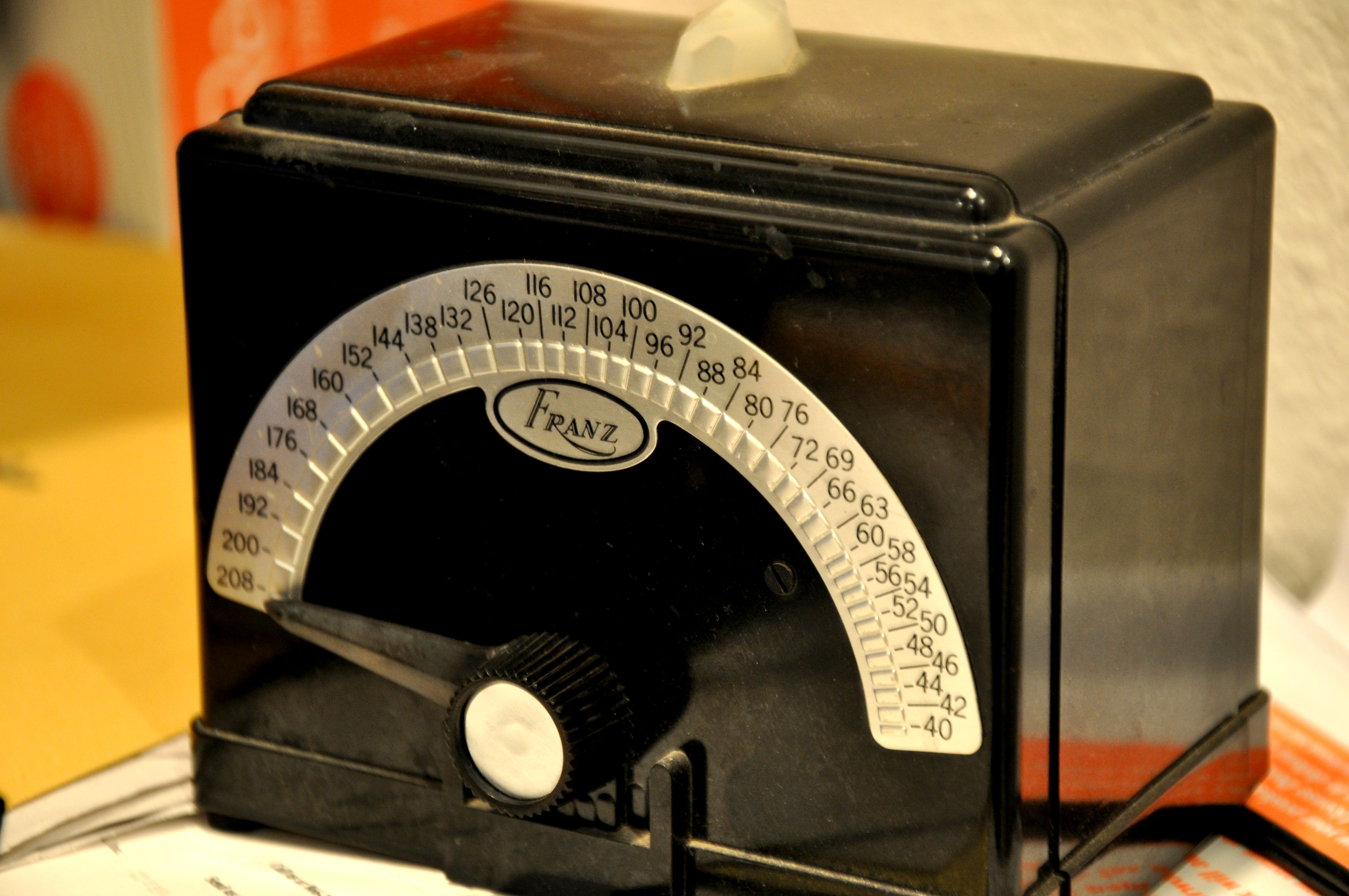
Franz eletromechanical metronome

Electromechanical metronomes were invented by Frederick Franz in the US and patented in 1953. Instead of a clockwork or a quartz crystal, a plug-in electric motor operates the mechanism. Most use a mechanical variable-speed drive combination with a momentary switch and a cam wheel to time the beats. A frequent feature is an embedded neon lamp that flashes in time with the beat. Franz and Yamaha were common manufacturers in the 1960s and 1970s; a popular model was the Franz LB4.

After the fall of the Soviet Bloc in 1991, the 75-foot (23 m) electromechanical Prague Metronome was installed as a silent kinetic sculpture overlooking the city, an inverted pendulum symbolizing the passage of time. It may still be the world's largest metronome, although Geneva (since 1972) and Gdańsk (since 2016) each have a larger pendulum clock.

=== Electronic metronomes ===
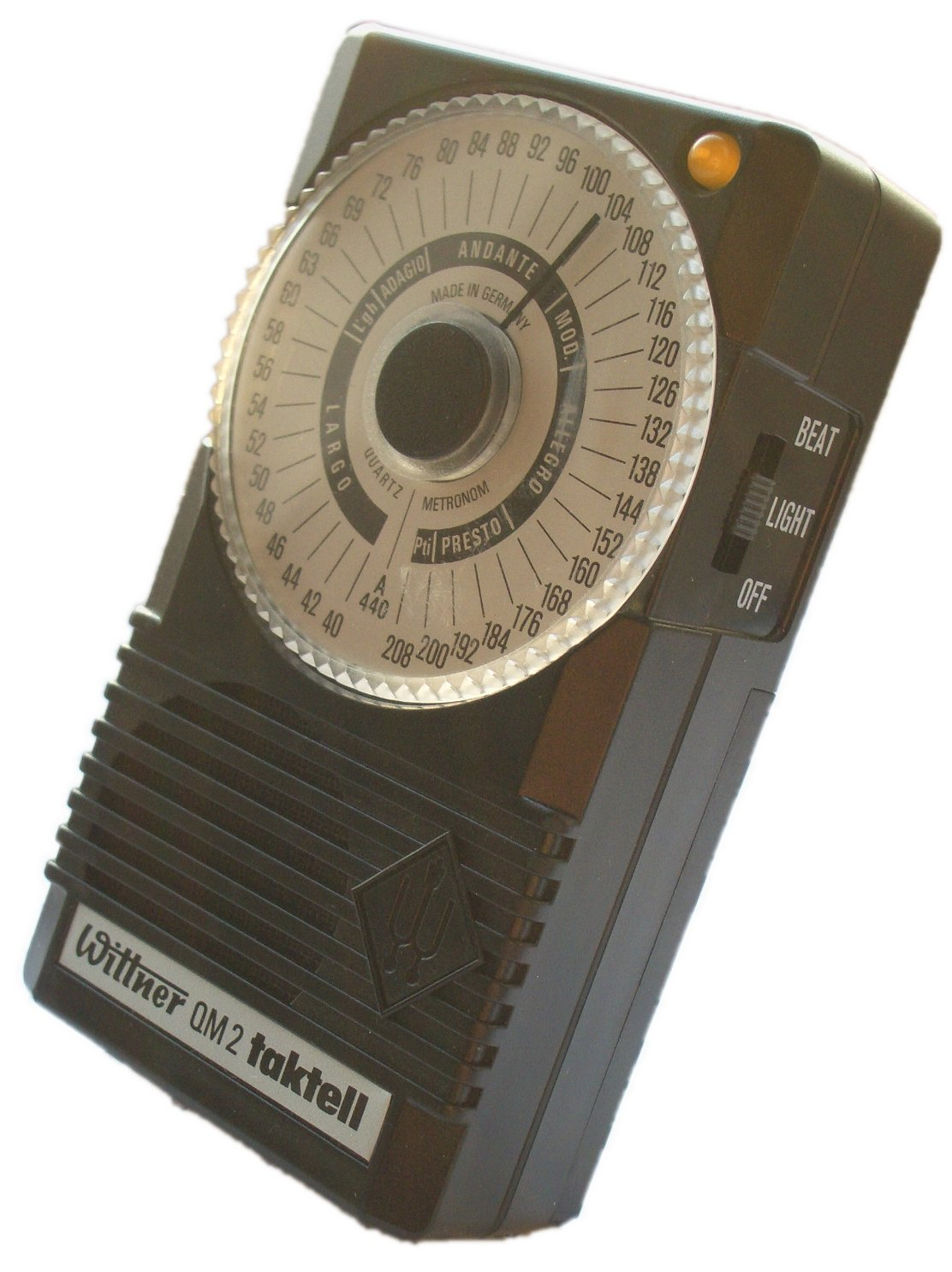
Wittner electronic metronome

Most modern metronomes are electronic and use a battery-powered quartz crystal to maintain accuracy in any position, comparable to wristwatches since the 1980s. Electronic metronomes are considerably smaller and more rugged than the earlier types. The simplest electronic metronomes have dials or buttons to control the tempo and volume. Some also produce or measure tuning notes, usually around the range of A440 (440 hertz). Sophisticated metronomes can produce two or more distinct sounds. Tones can differ in pitch, volume and/or timbre to distinguish downbeats from other beats, as well as compound and complex time signatures. Many electronic musical keyboards have built-in metronome functions with selectable rhythm patterns.

=== Software metronomes ===
Click track at 120 BPM in 4/4 measures

Click track at 50 BPM, subdivided into sixteenth notes

21st-century digital software metronomes run either as standalone applications on computers and smartphones, or in music sequencing and audio multitrack software packages. In recording studio applications, such as film scoring, a software metronome may provide a click track to synchronize musicians.

Portable MP3 players including iPods can play pre-recorded MP3 metronome click tracks, which can use different sounds and samples instead of the usual metronome click or beep. Users of smartphones can install a wide range of metronome applications. The Google search engine includes an interactive metronome that can play between 40 and 218 BPM. Either method avoids the need to bring a physical metronome to lessons or practice sessions.

=== Vibrating metronome ===
In the 21st century, vibrating metronomes emerged as an alternative to audible or visual timing tools, providing a tactile means of tempo guidance. These devices produce rhythmic pulses that the user feels on their body, typically through vibrations delivered via a wristband, clip, or wearable device. Vibrating metronomes are especially useful in loud environments where audible clicks are difficult to hear, or in quiet practice settings where noise would be disruptive. Most vibrating metronomes are electronic, using internal motors or piezoelectric actuators to generate physical pulses. They are often wearable and portable, offering users the ability to place them on different parts of the body—such as the wrist, ankle, chest, or even the back—to better align with their physical playing posture or movement. Some models allow for custom vibration strength, beat subdivision, and group synchronization, making them popular among ensemble musicians and marching bands. They are particularly useful for musicians with hearing impairments or for performers of acoustic instruments, like strings or classical guitar, where audible clicks may interfere with sound quality. However, critics note that vibrations can sometimes be difficult to perceive during physically intense performances or when the device is poorly positioned. One notable example is the Soundbrenner Pulse, launched in 2015, which helped popularizing the idea of wearable metronomes among both amateur and professional musicians; It connects wirelessly to mobile apps for tempo control, synchronization, and advanced features such as setlists and rhythm libraries.

== Usage ==
=== Tempo indication ===
In written musical scores since the early 1800s, composers and conductors (or editors) often indicate their preferred tempos using BPM metronome speeds, with or without descriptive tempo markings, to help musicians prepare for a performance. Even works that do not require a strictly constant tempo, such as musical passages with rubato, sometimes provide BPM markings to indicate the general tempo. Another mark that denotes tempo is M.M. (or MM), for Maelzel's Metronome. The notation M.M. is usually followed by a note value and a number that indicates the tempo, as in M.M. = 60.

Ludwig van Beethoven, a personal acquaintance of Maelzel, became the first notable composer to indicate specific metronome markings in his music. This was done in December 1815, with the corrected copy of the score of the Cantata op. 112 containing Beethoven's first metronome mark.

=== Pacing tool ===
Musicians often practise with metronomes to develop and maintain a sense of timing and tempo. Metronomes are also used as a training tool to achieve a desired performance speed—not only by musicians, but also by dancers, runners, swimmers, and others.

Specific uses include learning to maintain tempos and beats consistently. For example, a musician fighting a tendency to speed up might practise a phrase repeatedly while slightly slowing the BPM setting each time, to play more steadily. A musician or athlete seeking to improve technical proficiency might set the metronome to gradually higher speeds until the desired tempo is achieved. This also helps to expose unintentional slowdowns due to technical challenges or fatigue. Additionally, recording musicians use click tracks from metronomes to help audio engineers synchronize audio tracks.

In health care, metronomes can be used to maintain the desired pacing in various physiological tests and procedures. For example, CPR chest compressions are significantly more likely to follow the recommended 100–120 BPM when a hospital emergency room uses an audible metronome, or when rescuers in non-hospital settings can remember a suitably paced song as a "mental metronome".

==== Metronome technique ====
"Metronome technique" is extensive and has been the subject of several books for musicians. The "intuitive" approach is simply to practise a full musical work, in time with a metronome clicking the downbeats. With more advanced metronome technique, musicians practise separate exercises to strengthen their sense of rhythm, tempo, and musical time, while also cultivating flexibility and expression.

The basic skill required is the ability to play "in the pocket"–that is, precisely on the click of the metronome, in a relaxed fashion. It helps musicians to develop a strong sense of time, at intervals corresponding to fractions of a second. One challenge with this approach, especially for pianists and percussionists, is the metronome click seeming to vanish (or at least be heard less distinctly) when one hits the click exactly. Musicians who attempt to play in the pocket with a metronome without established technique may find that it introduces tension and effort into their performance. To address these difficulties, musicians may first learn to play consistently behind or ahead of the click whenever they want to. As a result, they develop a clear sense of "where the click is" and can train to hit the click as well.

2/4 at 60 BPM. This track plays 5 measures, then goes silent for 2, 3, 4, and 8 measures (alternating with 2 measures played), a typical exercise to help internalize a stronger sense of tempo.

Much of modern metronome technique aims to resolve timing problems without creating overdependence on the metronome. Typical exercises are to practise maintaining a tempo while the metronome is muted for progressively longer periods of time, or to practise with displaced clicks (offset from the usual downbeats) or polyrhythms against the metronome.

To help build rhythmic flexibility and musical expression in performances, preparatory exercises with the metronome often incorporate a fluid sense of timing. For example, musicians may practise drifting gradually from one beat to the next, or alternately pulling behind and pushing ahead of the click. As the author and drummer Mac Santiago wrote: "The ability to hear the pulse and yet accelerate or decelerate slightly is a great way to incorporate human feeling into a musical performance. ... This also works for the actions of ritardando and accelerando, as they are relative to a steady pulse and are best performed gradually rather than in sudden shifts."

=== Percussion instrument ===
Perhaps the most famous, and most direct, use of the metronome as an unconventional musical instrument is in György Ligeti's composition, Poème Symphonique for 100 metronomes (1962). Two years earlier, Toshi Ichiyanagi had written Music for Electric Metronomes (1960). Maurice Ravel used three metronomes at different speeds for the opening of his opera about a clockmaker, L'heure espagnole (1911).

The clicking sounds of mechanical metronomes have sometimes been used to provide a soft rhythm track without using any of the usual percussion instruments. Paul McCartney did this on "Distractions" (Flowers in the Dirt, 1989). Following the metronome, McCartney performed a rhythm track by hitting various parts of his body. Also, in Ennio Morricone's theme "Farewell to Cheyenne" (featured in the film Once Upon a Time in the West, 1968), the steady clip-clop beat is provided by the deliberately distorted and slowed-down sound of a mechanical metronome.

Five metronomes begin Philip Miller's musical score to William Kentridge's video installation "The Refusal of Time" (2012).

== Reception ==
=== Positive views ===
The metronome is usually viewed positively by performers, teachers, conservatories, and musicologists (who spend considerable time analysing metronome markings). It is considered an excellent practice tool because of its steady beat, being "mathematically perfect and categorically correct". This removes guesswork and aids musicians in various ways, including keeping tempos, countering tendencies to slow down or speed up unintentionally, monitoring technical progress, and increasing evenness and accuracy, especially in rapid passages. Metronomes are thus commonly used at all skill levels, from beginners to professional musicians, and are often recommended to music students without reservation. As commentator/violist Miles Hoffman wrote in 1997: "Most music teachers consider the metronome indispensable, and most professional musicians, in fact, continue to practice with a metronome throughout their careers." Some musicians took this view almost as soon as the metronome was invented in the early 19th century. The online book Metronome Techniques includes a "Potpourri" chapter with dozens of quotations from music teachers in favour of metronome practice.

=== Stricter rhythm in modern performance practice ===
The metronome has become very important in performance practice, and "largely unchallenged in musical pedagogy or scholarship since the 20th century". In the 19th century, the metronome was usually not used for ticking all through a piece, but only to check the tempo and then set it aside. This is in contrast with many musicians today, who practise with the metronome in the background for the entirety of a piece of music, generally leading to steadier performances.

The oboist and musicologist Bruce Haynes described the role of the metronome in modern performance style in detail in his book The End of Early Music. He emphasized that modern style is much more rhythmically rigid, compared with the effusive rubato and bluster characteristic of expressive 19th-century Romantic music. Because of this, the musicologist and critic Richard Taruskin called Modernism "refuge in order and precision, hostility to subjectivity, to the vagaries of personality". These qualities gave rise to the term metronomic, which music critics use to describe performances with an unyielding tempo, a mechanical rhythmic approach, and equal stress to all subintervals; violinist Sol Babitz considered it "sewing machine" style with limited flexibility. Some writers have drawn parallels with a modern technological society that is ordered by the clock.

==== Misrepresentation and neglect of historic performance practice ====
Not only is today's modern performance practice different from historic ones, a modern metronomic performance practice is today often used for performing historic repertoire (while being propagated as being historically correct or informed), with anachronistic results. Musicians and educators often misrepresent (and misunderstand) historic tempo as having been metrically regular or benefiting from metronome usage.

- "[...]one of the most stubborn modern misconceptions concerning baroque music is that a metronomic regularity was intended."
- "Primary source evidence uncovers that historical attitudes toward metronomes were unlike those of modern-age pedagogues and performers."
- "the discord between Maelzel’s age and ours regarding the values of musical time and performance practices: those metronomic qualities largely rejected by Maelzel’s musical contemporaries are often vehemently endorsed today by many professional musicians and educators who apply mechanically precise tempos and rhythms to all musical repertoires."
- "Under a metronome-centric methodology of historical tempo research, modern scholars often arrived at anachronistic and pseudoscientific laws for musical pulse and meter."
- "When an entire musical culture treats one technological system as the best (or only) way to achieve the “the right tempo and rhythm,” then a mechanical hegemony over that culture has surely arisen and past epistemologies and practices have become neglected or forgotten."

=== Criticisms ===
Unlike approximate and descriptive tempo markings, a published metronome speed indicates a highly specific tempo that cannot adapt to variations in musical aesthetics, concert hall acoustics, or the instruments themselves. This is one reason why composers including Felix Mendelssohn and Richard Wagner have criticized the publication of metronome marks. As Johannes Brahms once commented regarding his German Requiem: "I think here as well as with all other music, the metronome is of no value. As far at least as my experience goes, everybody has, sooner or later, withdrawn his metronome marks."

A metronome only provides a fixed, continuous beat. Therefore, metronome markings on sheet music provide a reference, but cannot accurately communicate the pulse, swing, or groove of music. The pulse is often irregular, e.g., in accelerando, rallentando, or expressive musical phrasing such as rubato. Even such highly rhythmical musical forms as samba, if performed in a culturally authentic style consistent with recordings by early practitioners, cannot be captured with the beats of a metronome. Performances that are unfailingly regular rhythmically might be criticized as being metronomic, lacking the characteristic swing of the genre.

Some have argued that "the metronome has no real musical value", hurting rather than helping musicians' sense of rhythm. The use of a metronome has been compared to the difference between mechanically aided and freehand drawing, in that the output with a metronome is said to be rigid and hampering creativity. American composer and critic Daniel Gregory Mason wrote that the use of the metronome is "dangerous" because it leads musicians to play by the measure or beat instead of the phrase, at the expense of liveliness, instinct, and rhythmical energy, "a dead body in place of the living musical organism". Even proponents of the metronome have warned that its strict speed and repetition can hinder internal rhythm and musicality when "over-used".

== Alternatives to metronome use ==
If a musician decides not to use a metronome, other methods are required to deal with timing and tempo glitches, rushing and dragging. These strategies may also be combined with metronome technique as a complementary approach.

Humans rely on an innate sense of rhythm to perform ordinary activities such as walking, hammering nails or chopping vegetables. Even speech and thought have a rhythm of sorts. Author/drummer Andrew C. Lewis recommends working to bring these everyday rhythms into music:

"Rhythm is everywhere. Be sensitive to it, and stay aware of spontaneous occurrences that can spur rhythmic development. Listen all the time and use your imagination. Become a rhythm antenna."

Until the 19th century in Europe, people used to sing as they worked, in time to the rhythms of their daily tasks. In many parts of the world today, especially tribal areas, people still sing frequently and spontaneously as they engage in daily activities. Even without singing, instrumentalists can strengthen their innate sense of pulse using quieter bodily rhythms, such as breathing, walking, foot tapping, or other activities. (Likewise, listeners often adjust these movements subconsciously when hearing rhythmic music.) Musicians can deal with timing and tempo glitches by learning to "hear an ideal performance in their mind" first, and by listening carefully to recordings of themselves and others.

Notes inégales (unequal notes) are a common feature of French Baroque music, in which subdivided pairs of notes are written with equal duration but performed with a long/short dotted or triplet rhythm. Usually, these pairs are played with steady downbeats and the same amount of swing throughout, like modern jazz. Less commonly, the unequal rhythms are more extensive and irregular, like the constantly shifting rhythms of speech. In this view, rhythms that are subtly unsynchronized and uneven throughout can help to keep the music alive and interesting, and prevent any feeling of sameness and boredom. Musicians may practise organizing notes and phrases into "musical gestures", patterns of motions that come naturally, rather than metronomically strict measures. Performers also may slightly delay or extend an important note of a musical phrase, to build a sense of anticipation or emphasis. This freer approach is a minority interpretation of notes inégales for early music, but noteworthy because of its perspective on musical time and rhythm, and its relevance to musicians practising to create an emotionally engaging experience for listeners.
