= Continuous cooling transformation =

Diagram in metallurgy

Continuous cooling transformation diagram of EN S355 (ASTM A-572 Grade 50, warranted yield stress 355 MPa) for welding (fast cooling, linear scale).

A continuous cooling transformation (CCT) phase diagram is often used when heat treating steel. These diagrams are used to represent which types of phase changes will occur in a material as it is cooled at different rates. These diagrams are often more useful than time-temperature-transformation diagrams because it is more convenient to cool materials at a certain rate (temperature-variable cooling), than to cool quickly and hold at a certain temperature (isothermal cooling).

== Types of continuous cooling diagrams ==
There are two types of continuous cooling diagrams drawn for practical purposes.

- Type 1: This is the plot beginning with the transformation start point, cooling with a specific transformation fraction and ending with a transformation finish temperature for all products against transformation time for each cooling curve.
- Type 2: This is the plot beginning with the transformation start point, cooling with specific transformation fraction and ending with a transformation finish temperature for all products against cooling rate or bar diameter of the specimen for each type of cooling medium..

TTT diagram for constant cooling rate transformations of steel.

== See also ==
- Isothermal transformation
- Phase diagram
