= Sébastien de Brossard =

French music theorist, composer and collector (1655-1730)

Sebastien de Brossard
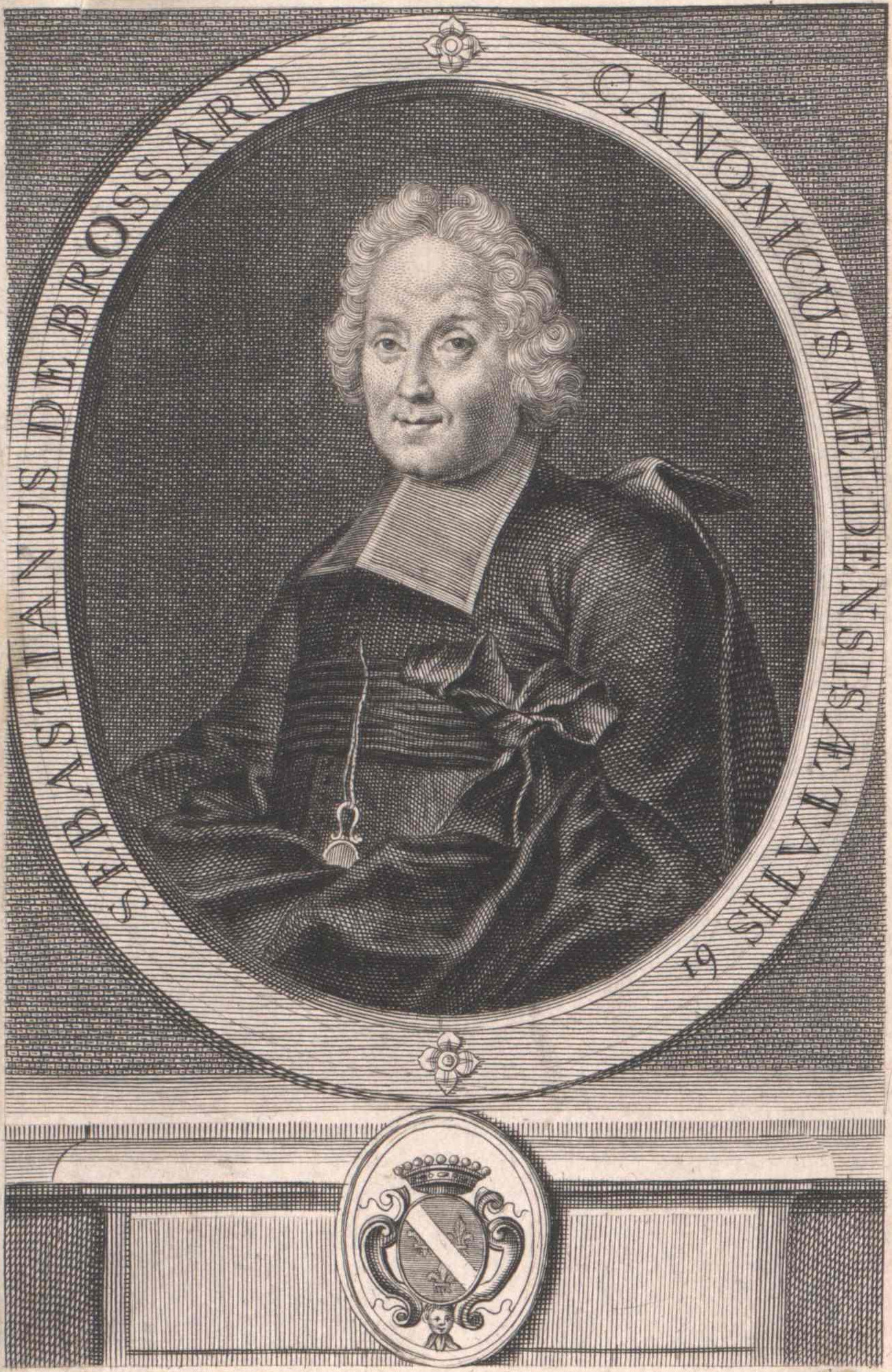
- Sebastien de Brossard
- Born: 12 September 1655; Dompierre, Kingdom of France
- Died: 10 August 1730 (aged 74); Meaux, Kingdom of France

Sébastien de Brossard (French: [sebastjɛ̃ də bʁɔsaʁ]; 12 September 1655 – 10 August 1730) was a French music theorist, composer and collector.

== Life ==
Brossard was born in Dompierre, Orne. After studying philosophy and theology at Caen, he studied music and established himself in Paris in 1678 and remained there until 1687. He briefly was the private tutor of the young son of Nicolas-Joseph Foucault, a collector and bibliophile. He became a very close friend to Étienne Loulié, one of the musicians who performed the Italianate works that Marc-Antoine Charpentier was composing for Marie de Lorraine, Duchess of Guise, better known as "Mademoiselle de Guise." While in Paris, he also became close to Samuel Morland, an English inventor and polymath who was working with Joseph Sauveur, a mathematician, on the Machine de Marly. It was during talks about music with Morland that Brossard deduced the role that a major third versus a minor third play in differentiating a major scale from a minor scale.

These contacts shaped Brossard's future preoccupations. He enthusiastically embraced Italian music; he became a collector of musical manuscripts and music treatises; he perfected his knowledge of musical theory; and autodidact though he was, he honed his compositional skills.

In 1687, Brossard was named a vicar at the Strasbourg Cathedral. He remained there until 1698. He founded an Académie de Musique at Strasbourg in 1687 and arranged Lully's Alceste for performance there. It was during the decade he spent in Strasbourg that he acquired the bulk of his music library, which has since become legendary. A collection of 157 sonatas acquired by Brossard bears the name Codex Rost, after the Cantor at Baden-Baden, Franz Rost (1640-1688). It is sometimes the only source of works by certain German and Italian composers of the 17th century.

In 1698, Brossard was appointed chapel master at the Meaux Cathedral and remained in that post until 1715. After his retirement, he worked on liturgical publications for the diocese. He died in Meaux in 1730, at age 75.

== Writings ==
Brossard wrote a book on Greek, Latin, and Italian musical terms, the first music dictionary in French, in 1703. In 1724, he offered his very rich library, together with its annotated catalogue, to Louis XV, in exchange for a pension. Among the items in the collection were the unpublished manuscripts of his late friend Étienne Loulié, and his own set of four motets Leçons des mortes, written in 1696-7.

A manuscript work of 393 pages accompanied by an alphabetical index of 253 pages, this catalogue today constitutes an incomparable source of information on music bibliography, the quality of printings, aesthetics, and the musical theory of the era. The manuscript (now available in published form) is kept at the Music Department of the Bibliothèque nationale de France.

== Compositions ==
=== Motets ===
- Ave vivens hostia (version de la source PR.I - 1702) SdB.23
- Ave vivens hostia (version de la source Ms, BERK) SdB.23
- O Jesu quam dulce SdB.24
- Congratulamini filiæ Syon SdB.25
- O vos ætherei SdB.26
- Festivi martyres SdB.27
- Angele sancte SdB.28
- Sonitus armorum SdB.29
- Quemadmodum desiderat cervus SdB.30
- O plenus irarum dies SdB.31
- Salve Rex Christe - Salve regina SdB.32
- O Domine quia refugium SdB.33
- Qui non diligent te SdB.34
- Festis læta sonent SdB.35
- Psallite superi SdB.36
- Templa nunc fument SdB.37
- Sicut cervus ad fontes SdB.38
- O Mysterium ineffabile SdB.39
- Pange lingua SdB.40
- Lauda anima mea SdB.41
- Pulchra chora anima SdB.42

4 Leçons des morts

- Parce mihi Domine SdB.43
- Tædet animam meam SdB.44
- Manus tua facerunt me SdB.45
- Responde mihi SdB.46
- Nisi Dominus SdB.47
- Elevation pro die purificationis, Stupete gentes SdB.48
- Beati immaculati SdB.49
- Canticum in honorem S. Cæcilliæ, in cymbalis et organo SdB.50
- Canticum in honorem S.pii Quinti, felix Dominici SdB.51
- Silentium dormi SdB.52
- Miserere mei Deus SdB.53
- Magnificat SdB.54

9 Leçons de Ténèbres SdB.57 à SdB.65 :

- Première leçon de Ténèbres du Mercredi Saint (1696-1697)
- Première leçon de Ténèbres du Jeudi Saint
- Première leçons de Ténèbres du Vendredi Saint
- Deuxième leçon de Ténèbres du Mercredi Saint
- Deuxième leçon de Ténèbres du Jeudi Saint
- Deuxième leçon de Ténèbres du Vendredi Saint
- Troisième leçon de Ténèbres du Mercredi Saint
- Troisième leçon de Ténèbres du Jeudi Saint
- Troisième leçon de Ténèbres du Vendredi Saint

=== Œuvres scéniques ===
- Typhon & les Géants SdB.67
- Concert sur l'Alceste de Lully SdB.69
- Intermèdes SdB.68

=== Œuvres chorales ===
- Retribue servo tuo SdB.4
- Missa quinti toni (Messe de Noël) SdB.5
- O miraculum navitatis SdB.6
- Stabat Mater SdB.8
- Cantique à Ste Cécile SdB.9
- Ave verum corpus SdB.10

=== Cantates ===
- Cantate morale sopra La vanita SdB.76
- Leandro SdB.77
- Judith SdB.72
- Abraham SdB.69
- La cheutte de Salomon SdB.71
- Les misères humaines SdB.75
- Les Trois enfans de la fournaise SdB.73
- Samson et Dalila SdB.70

=== Oratorios ===
- Dialogus Pœnitentis animæ, SdB.55
- Oratorio sopra L’immaculata, SdB.56

=== Grands Motets ===
- In convertendo Dominus SdB.2
- Miserere mei Deus SdB.1
- Canticum eucharisticum SdB.3

=== Musique instrumentale ===
- Première courante SdB.214
- Seconde courante SdB.215
- Sonate pour violon et basse continue SdB.216
- Sonate pour violon et basse continue SdB.217
- Menuet SdB.218
- Symphonie SdB.219
- Sonate en trio SdB.220
- Sonate en trio SdB.221
- Sonate en trio SdB.222
- Sonate en trio SdB.223
- Sonate en trio SdB.224
- Symphonie de Noël SdB.225
- Ritournelle ajoutée au Vidi Impium de Carissimi SdB.226
- Symphonia ajoutée au Exalta vocem tuam de foggia SdB.227
- Simphonie pour le Graduel (sol mineur) ajoutée à la missa S. Antonii Padovani de Baldrati SdB.228
- Simphonie pour le Graduel (la Majeur) ajoutée à la Missa Gaudimus omnes de Cosset SdB.229
- Simphonie pour le Graduel (la mineur) ajoutée à la Missa Concertata de Grandi SdB.230

=== Airs ===
- Vous demandez, Iris SdB.78
- Je ne viens plus SdB.79
- Héros dont le départ SdB.83
- Vous me dites, Iris SdB.84
- Un berger amoureux SdB.85
- Ne crois pas, folâtre berger SdB.86
- Lisette n'est plus inhumaine SdB.87
- Pour chanter de bon gout SdB.89
- Iris, si c'est vous offenser SdB.90
- Vous m'accusez à tort SdB.91
- Quand une inconstante bergère SdB.92
- Je meurs pour vous SdB.93
- Ah ! Je sens bien SdB.94
- Chaque jour l'ingrate Climeine SdB.95
- Ah ! qu'un berger est dangeteux SdB.96
- Tous les jours dans ce bocage SdB.97
- Quand je n'aimais que ma musette SdB.98
- On sait que j'ai pour vous SdB.99
- Jeanne et Colin SdB.100
- Vous que le ciel fit naître SdB.101
- Que vous êtes heureux SdB.102
- L'amour, quand on aime SdB.103
- Non, vous ne m'aimez plus SdB.104
- Sombres forêts SdB.105
- Heurux moutons SdB.106
- Tu gardes tes moutons SdB.107
- Ne me demandez point SdB.108
- L'Amour folâtrant SdB.109
- Que sert à mon amour SdB.110
- Charmante Iris SdB.111
- Une langueur extrème SdB.112
- Je suis tendre et fidèle SdB.113
- Pour avoir bu de notre vin SdB.114
- Pour n'avoir su me défendre SdB.115
- Je suis prêt de revoir SdB.116
- Consolez vous SdB.117
- Aimables lieux SdB.118
- Qu'un cœur souffre SdB.119
- Peut être de vos amis SdB.120
- Doux amis du repos SdB.121
- Ô l'heureux sort SdB.122
- Quand on est aimé SdB.123
- Est bien fol qui se délivre SdB.124
- Chez cette rare beauté SdB.125
- Soyez tendre, soyez fidèle SdB.126
- Que le tourment est rigoureux SdB.127
- Pourquoi me fuyez vous SdB.128
- Que ces prés, ces ruisseaux SdB.129
- Qu'on puisse oublier SdB.130
- Aimons, c'est un plaisir extème SdB.131
- De vos rigueurs et de mes peines SdB.132
- Le peu de résistance SdB.133
- Gardez vous d'être inhumaines SdB.134
- Mes moutons, mon chien SdB.135
- Iris au bord de la Seine SdB.136
- Facheux respect SdB.137
- Aux lois d'amour mon cœur SdB.138
- Chaque, chaque instant SdB.139
- Tandis qu'on vous aime SdB.140
- Petits moutons, qui dans la plaine SdB.141 a
- Petits moutons qui dans la plaine SdB.141 b
- Je cherche en vain SdB.142
- Amants quand finiront vos peines SdB.143
- Je ne saurais donner SdB.144
- Vous savez tous chanter SdB.145
- Sans l'amour, les plaisirs SdB.146
- Je n'aime plus ni catin ni Sylvie SdB.147
- Pressé de mon dépit extrême SdB. 148 a
- Pressé de mon dépit extrême (Annexe) SdB.148 b
- Iris, est-il un cœur SdB.149
- Vous ne m'entendrez plus SdB.150
- En vain je languis SdB.151
- Dans ce vaste univers SdB.152
- Retirons nous dans les hameaux SdB.169
- Feuillages, bois SdB.170
- La fierté sied bien SdB.171
- Lisette me dit SdB.172
- Tout ce qui flatte SdB.173
- Une flamme satisfaite SdB.174
- Dans ces lieux rêvons SdB.175
- Les amants pour se saisfaire SdB.176
- Déjà l'hiver menace SdB.177
- Mes moutons sont tous languissants SdB.178 a
- Mes moutons sont tous languissants SdB.178 b
- Petits agneaux SdB.179
- Si je n'avais promis SdB.180
- Quand on aime et qu'on est sage SdB.181
- Ah ! n'aimerez vous point SdB.182
- J'aime une blonde SdB.183
- Tu ne dois pas, jeune Lisette SdB.184
- Il est doux, belle bergère SdB.185
- Il faut partir SdB.186
- Amants qui soupirez SdB.187
- Tant que dans nos hameaux SdB.188
- Je crains plus que le tonnerre SdB.189
- Qu'on ne me serve plus SdB.190
- Puisque la campagne SdB.191
- Au vent les étendards SdB.192
- Chantons tous trois SdB.193
- Amour ne trouble pas SdB.194
- Quel courroux ! quelle rage SdB.195 a
- Quel cahos quel mélange (annexe) SdB.195 b
- Quand je suis las SdB.196
- Bacchus et l'amour SdB.197
- Pour passer le temps SdB.198
- Alerte vignerons SdB.199
- Nos bergères sont légères SdB.200
- Jeune et charmante Iris SdB.201
- J'allais mourir d'amour SdB.202
- Que maudit soit le fracas SdB.203
- Amis, j'ai trouvé le secret SdB.204
- Ah ! quelle folie d'aimer SdB.205
- Au doux son de ma flûte SdB.210
- On me reproche en vain SdB.211
- Vents, qui dans nos forêts SdB.213

== Discography ==
- Cantiques sacrez, Salve Rex Christe, Psallite Superi, Qui non diligit te, O Domine quia refugium, Templa nunc fument, Oratorio seu Dialogus Pœnitentis animæ cum Deo, Festis lasta sonens, Noémie Rime, soprano, Jean-Paul Fouchécourt, alto et ténor, Ian Honeyman, ténor, Bernard Deletré, basse, Le Parlement de Musique, dir. Martin Gester CD Opus 111 1992.
- Messe du V^{e} ton (Messe de Noël) (SdB.5), Stabat Mater (SdB.8), Maitrise de Haute Bretagne, Geoffrey Marshall, orgue, Claire Devilleneuve, violoncelle baroque, dir. Jean-Michel Noël CD M.H.B. 02 1993.
- Missa quinti toni pour la fête de Noël (SdB.5), Ensemble vocal du Parlement de Musique, direction et orgue Martin Gester CD France Musique collection Tempéraments 1996.
- Première leçon des morts, Troisième leçon des morts, Quatrième Leçon des morts, pour dessus et hautre-contre, deux violons et basse continue, Sonate en trio pour deux violons et basse continue, Dialogus pœnitentis animæ com Deo pour dessus et alto, deux violons, basson et orgue obligés, Véronique Gens, dessus, Gérard Lesne, haute-contre et dir. Il Seminario Musicale. CD Virgin veritas 1997.
- Grands motets, In convertendo Dominus (SdB.2), Miserere mei Deus (SdB.1), Canticum eucharisticum pro pace (SdB.3), solistes, Chœur de chambre Accentus, Ensemble baroque de Limoges, dir. Christophe Coin CD Auvidis Astrée 1997.
- Missa quinti toni pour la fête de Noël, (SdB.5), Stabat mater, (SdB;8) Retribue servo tue (SdB.4), Les Pages & les Chantres de la Chapelle, Le Mercure galant, dir. Olivier Schneebeli CD Auvidis Astrée 1997.
- Canticum primum, Canticum secundum, Canticum quartum, Canticum quintum, Isabelle Desrochers, soprano, Frédéric Désenclos, orgue CD Auvidis Astrée 1998.
- Oratorio Sopra l'immaculata Conceptione Della B. Vergine (SdB.56), Sonata 2da (ut majeur) (SdB.224), Cantate Leandro (SdB.77), Dialogus Pœnitentis Animæ cum Deo (SdB.55), Ensemble La Rêveuse, dir. Benjamin Perrot / Florence Bolton, Emmanuel Mandrin, orgue, Bertrand Cuiller, clavecin CD Mirare 2011.
- Sonate en trio en mi mineur (SdB.220), Sonate en trio en la mineur (SdB.223), Stabat mater (SdB.8), La Nuova Musica, dir. David Bates CD HMU 807659 Harmonia Mundi USA 2016.
- Silentium dormi (SdB.52), Ensemble Sébastien de Brossard, dir. Fabien Armangaud CD ENP 001 Enphases 2017.
- Miserere mei Deus, Stabat mater, Ave verum corpus, Les Arts Florissants, dir. Paul Agnew CD Harmonia Mundi 2018.
- Sonate en trio in A minor, Sonate in C major, Sonate in D major, Ensemble Diderot CD Audax Records 2019. Diapason d’or, Choc Classica.
