= Henri Foucault =

Henri Foucault (? – c. 1719 or 1720) was a French merchant, sheet music publisher (around 1690) and stationer. His shop was located rue Saint-Honoré, under the sign À la règle d’or.

He was condemned for publishing and selling "Airs de musique" of which Jean-Christophe Ballard held the privilege (28 June 1690 judgment).

On 15 July 1721, the widow Foucault, then remarried, sold the store and the funds to François Boivin and his uncle, Michel Pignolet de Montéclair, for their music publishing house established the same year.

Among others, Foucault published the works of Jean-Baptiste Lully, Marin Marais, Louis-Antoine Dornel and Nicolas Siret.

== Bibliography ==
- Raphaëlle Legrand, Foucault et la diffusion des œuvres de Lully : l’exemple des parties de basse continue du fonds du Conservatoire de Marseille. In Quellenstudien zu Jean-Baptiste Lully (L’œuvre de Lully : études des sources. Hommage à Lionel Sawkins. éd., Jérôme de La Gorce et Herbert Schneider). Hildesheim : Olms, 1999, (p. 352-381)
- (in English) Carl B. Schmidt, Two new Foucault sources of Lully ballets in the United States. Dans Quellenstudien zu Jean-Baptiste Lully = L’œuvre de Lully : études des sources. Hommage à Lionel Sawkins. éd. Jérôme de La Gorce et Herbert Schneider. Hildesheim : Olms, 1999, (pp. 178–312)

== See also ==
- Répertoire international des sources musicales
