= Guillaume Le Blond =

French mathematician (1705–1781)

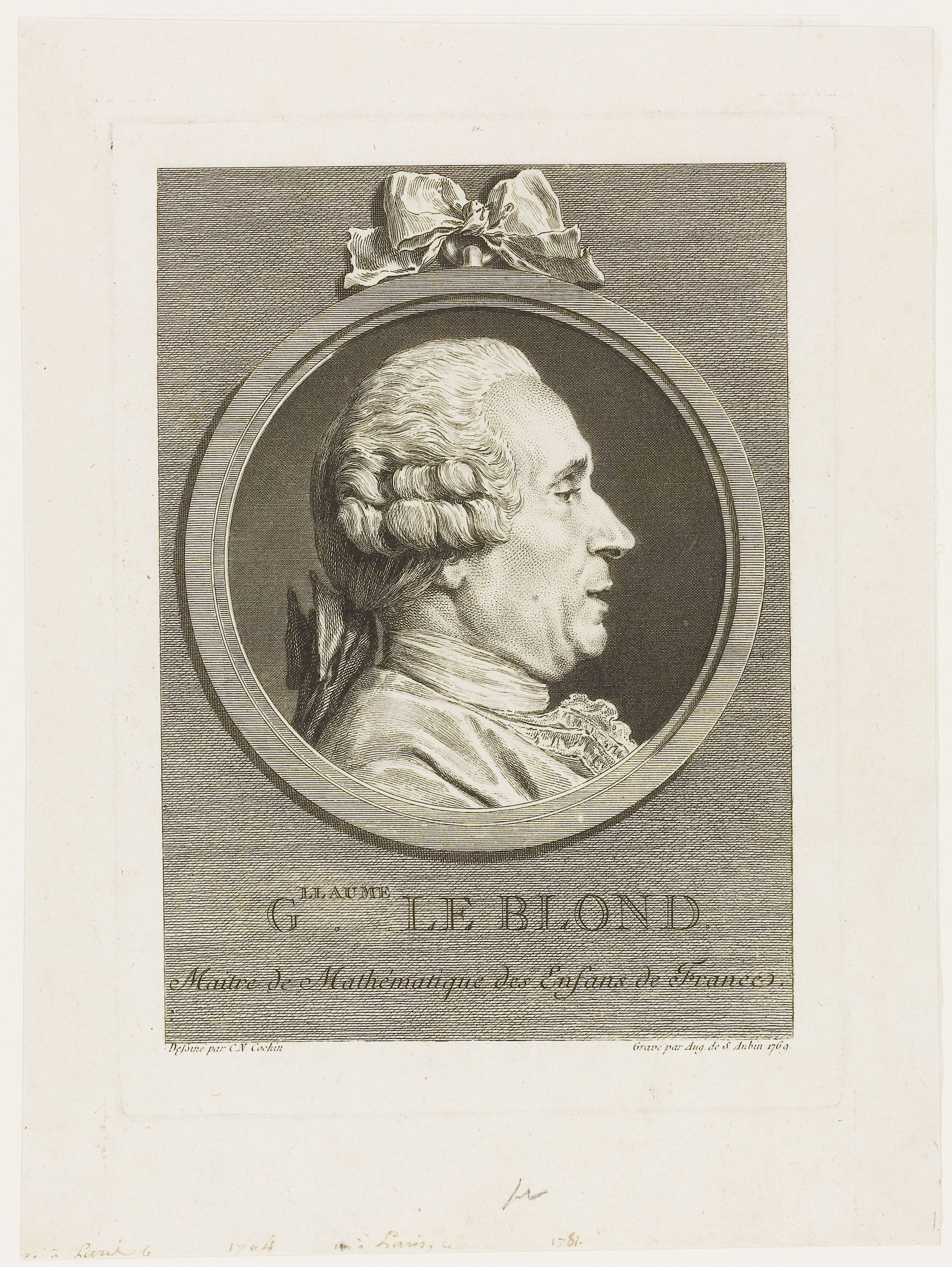
Guillaume Le Blond

Guillaume Le Blond (1705 – May 24, 1781) was a French mathematician. He was born in Paris.

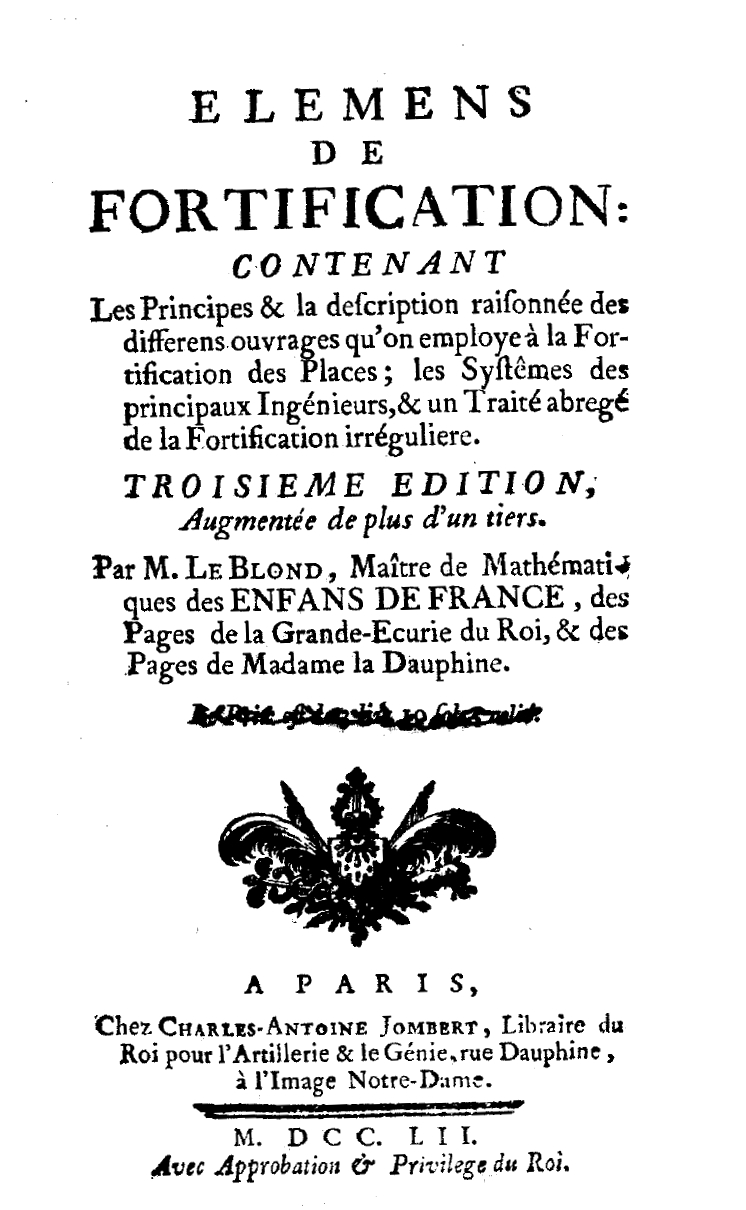
Eléments de fortification, 1752

He was a professor of mathematics at the grand stable of the King (1736) and then the Enfants de France (1756). Leblond kept this job until 1778, when he became secretary of the cabinet of Madame Victoire.

Le Blond wrote the following works, some of which have been translated into German. His work "Éléments de fortification" was translated to Ottoman Turkish language in 1833 as "Usûl-i İstihkâmât"(Method of Fortifications) by Ishak Efendi.

- Essai sur la castramétation, 1748, in-8°);
- Éléments de tactique, 1758, in-4°;
- Artillerie raisonnée contenant l’usage des différentes bouches à feu, 1761, in-8°;
- l’Arithmétique et la géométrie de l’officier, 1768, 2 vol. in-8°;
- Traité de l’attaque des places, 1780, in-8°;
- Éléments de fortification, 1739, in-8°.

He also produced editions of Mémoires d’artillerie by Pierre Surirey de Saint-Remy and the Géométrie by Joseph Sauveur and collaborated on the Encyclopédie.

== Sources ==
- Pierre Larousse, Grand Dictionnaire universel du XIXe siècle, vol. 10, Paris, Administration du grand Dictionnaire universel, (p. 288).
