= Pierre Surirey de Saint-Remy =

French general

- Pierre Surirey de Saint-Remy
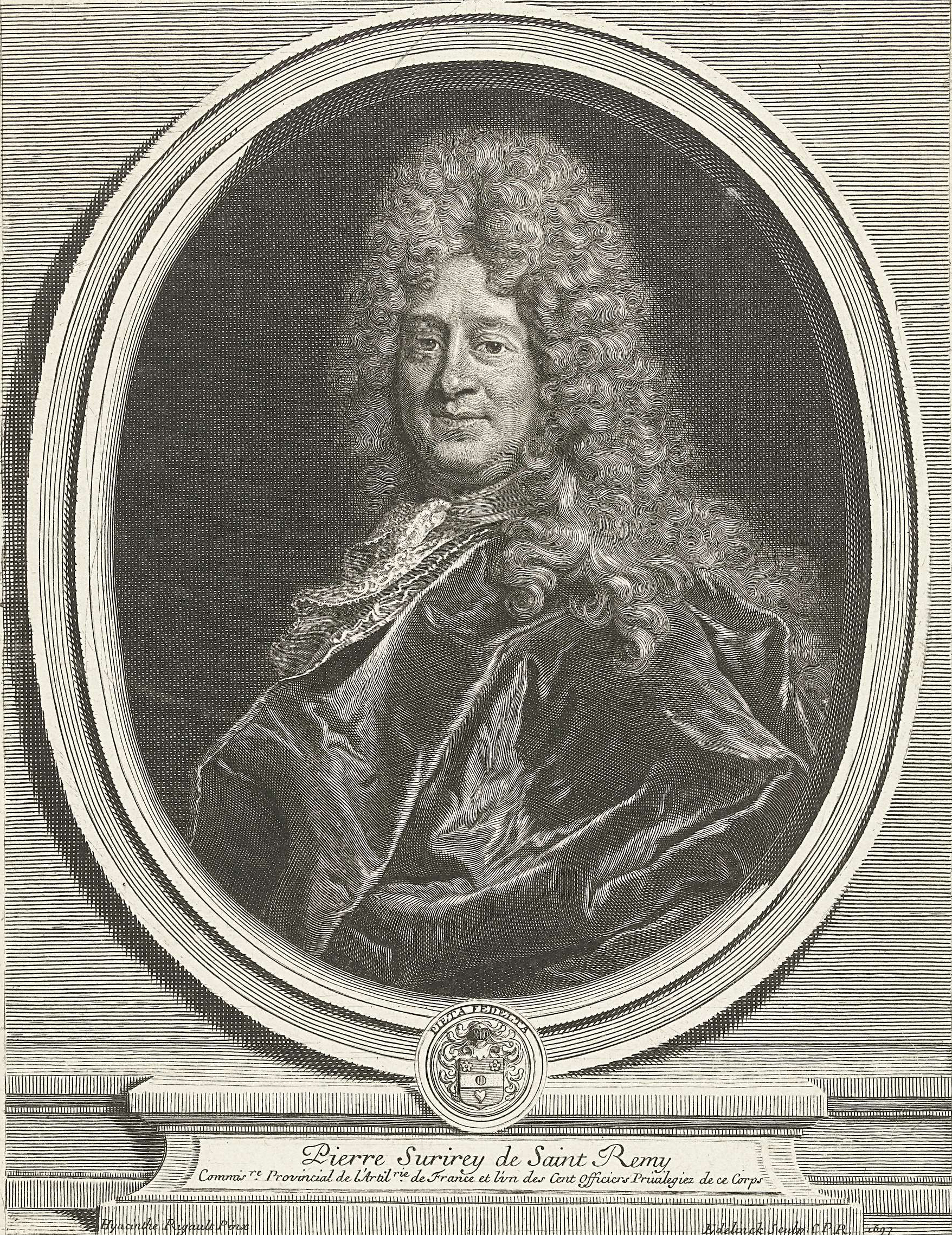
- By Hyacinthe Riggaud
- Born: December 1644; Saint-Rémy, Province of Normandy
- Died: 25 December 1716 (aged 71–72); Paris
- Occupations: General and writer

Pierre Surirey de Saint-Remy (1645–1716) was a French general.

== Career ==
He followed a military career and from 1670 in the Royal Corps of Artillery. Provincial Commissioner of Artillery in 1692, he is the author of Mémoires d'artillerie, published for the first time in 1697.

He was named a lieutenant of the Grand maître de l'artillerie de France in 1703 and was a maréchal de camp.

He married Marie-Madeleine Hénault, the aunt of Charles-Jean-François Hénault, in 1672.

== Publications ==
- Mémoires d'artillerie... (1697)
