= Jérôme de La Gorce =

French art historian and musicologist

Jérôme de La Gorce (born 1951 in Paris) is a French art historian and musicologist. He is a specialist in dramatic music and performing arts in France in the 17th and 18th centuries.

== Career ==
After having followed a double university course, he defended a thesis dedicated to the "marvelous in the opera under the reign of Louis XIV".

Director of research at the CNRS, a member of the Centre André-Chastel (UMR 8150), he also teaches at Paris-Sorbonne University.

== Publications ==
- 1986: Jean Bérain the Elder, dessinateur du Roi Soleil, Paris, Herscher
- 1991: Marin Marais (with Sylvette Milliot), Paris, Fayard
- 1992: L'Opéra à Paris au temps de Louis XIV : histoire d'un théâtre, Desjonquères
- 1997: Féeries d’opéra : décors, machines et costumes en France (1645–1765), Paris, éditions du Patrimoine
- 2002: Jean-Baptiste Lully, Paris, Fayard, ISBN 9782213607085
- 2005: Carlo Vigarani, intendant des plaisirs de Louis XIV, Perrin
