= Joseph Marie, baron de Gérando =

French jurist, philanthropist and philosopher (1772–1842)

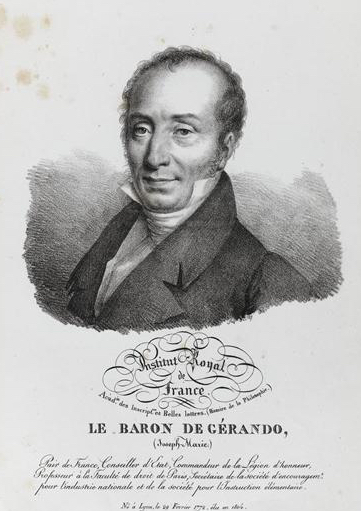
Joseph Marie, baron de Gérando.

Joseph Marie, baron de Gérando, born Joseph Marie Degérando (29 February 1772 in Lyon, France – 10 November 1842 in Paris), was a French jurist, philanthropist and philosopher of Italian descent.

He is most remembered for his 1804 book Histoire comparée des systèmes de philosophie, considérés relativement aux principes des connaissances humaines (Comparative History of Philosophical Systems, Considered in Relation to the Principles of Human Knowledge) as well as his 1820 study of benevolent activity, Le visiteur du pauvre (The visitor to the poor). He influenced Henry David Thoreau, Margaret Fuller, and especially Ralph Waldo Emerson who used his philosophical framework extensively supporting his own first book Nature.

== Main writings ==
- Des Signes et de l'Art de penser considérés dans leurs rapports mutuels, 4 vol., 1799-1800 Texte en ligne 1 2 3 4
- De la Génération des connaissances humaines, mémoire qui a partagé le prix de l'Académie de Berlin sur la question suivante : Démontrer d'une manière incontestable l'origine de toutes nos connaissances..., 1802. New edition in Corpus des œuvres de philosophie en langue française, Paris, Fayard, 1990
- Considération sur les diverses méthodes à suivre dans l'observation des peuples sauvages, 1800, engl. The observation of savage peoples, translated from the French by F. C. T. Moore, with a preface by E. E. Evans-Pritchard. London, Routledge & K. Paul, 1969.
- Le Visiteur du pauvre, 1824. New Edition : Jean-Michel Place, Paris, 1989. Texte en ligne, engl. visitor of the poor translated from the French of the baron Degerando; by a Lady of Boston; with and introduction by Joseph Tuckerman. Boston : Hilliard, Gray, Little, and Wilkins, 1832.
- Histoire comparée des systèmes de philosophie, relativement aux principes des connaissances humaines, 4 vol., 1822 Texte en ligne 1 2 3 4
- Du Perfectionnement moral, ou de l'Éducation de soi-même, 2 vol., 1824, engl. Self-education; or, The means and art of moral progress, translated from the French of M. le Baron Degerando by Elizabeth Palmer Peabody. Boston, Carter and Hendee, 1830.
- De l'Éducation des sourds-muets de naissance, 2 vol., 1827 Texte en ligne 1 2
- Institutes du droit administratif français, ou Éléments du code administratif, réunis et mis en ordre, 6 vol., 1829-1836 Texte en ligne : Supplément
- De la Bienfaisance publique, 2 vol., 1839 Texte en ligne 1 2
- Des Progrès de l'industrie, considérés dans leurs rapports avec la moralité de la classe ouvrière, 1841
- Histoire de la philosophie moderne, à partir de la renaissance des lettres jusqu'à la fin du XVIIIe siècle, 4 vol., 1847 Texte en ligne
- Les Bons Exemples, nouvelle morale en action, avec Benjamin Delessert, 1858 Texte en ligne
