= Australia on the Map =

Division of Australasian Hydrographic Society

Australia on the Map is the history and heritage division of the Australasian Hydrographic Society. It seeks to enhance Australians' knowledge, understanding and appreciation of the nation's early history, beginning in 1606 with the voyages of Willem Janszoon in Duyfken and Luis Váez de Torres in Los Tres Reyes and San Pedro, and continuing to the present.

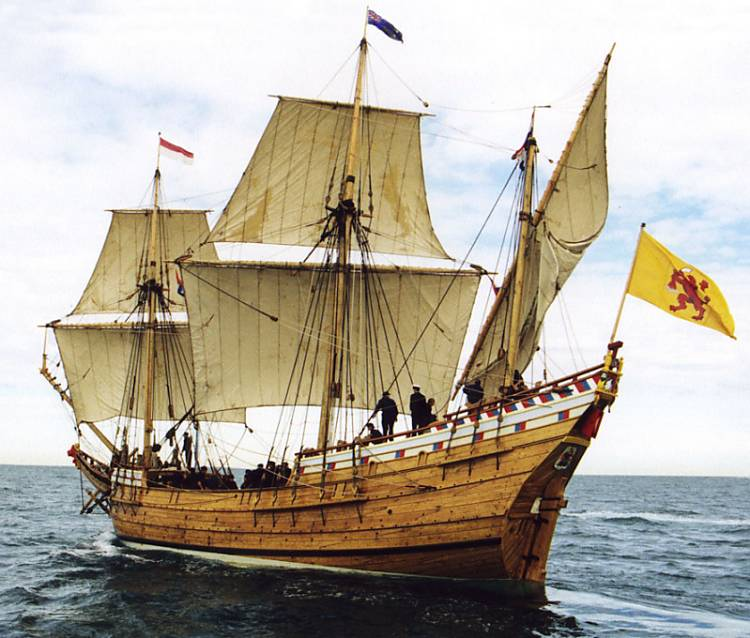
Duyfken replica under sail

== Origins ==
Australia on the Map Division of the Australasian Hydrographic Society is the successor organisation to Australia on the Map: 1606–2006 that was formed by Peter Reynders and Rupert Gerritsen in 2002. It was the vehicle for fostering commemorations in 2006 of the 400th anniversary of the charting of west Cape York, the first documented visit to Australia by Europeans, and Torres' voyage through Torres Strait shortly after.

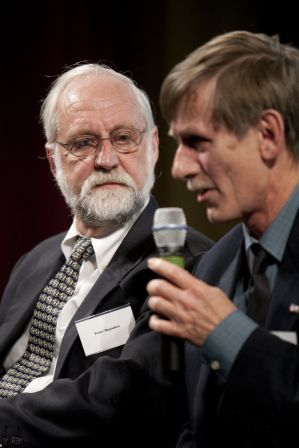
Peter Reynders and Rupert Gerritsen of Australia on the Map

A national organisation was formed, its patron initially being Kim Beazley AC, and subsequently Vice Admiral Chris Ritchie.

In 2006, in excess of 150 commemorative events occurred nationwide, the feature being a commemorative voyage along the west, south and east coasts of continental Australia, and Tasmania by the Duyfken replica.

== Formation ==
At the conclusion of 2006, those involved in Australia on the Map: 1606–2006 came to the realisation that there were significant limitations to Australian's knowledge of their early history. It was recognised that there needed to be ongoing education and awareness raising of the Australian community to overcome this limitation. At the same time the Australasian Hydrographic Society saw a need for greater awareness of hydrographic history and heritage among its members and stakeholders. Consequently, they invited those involved in Australia on the Map: 1606–2006 to form a new history and heritage region, to be known as Australia on the Map Division.

In April 2007, Australia on the Map: 1606–2006 was formally wound up. Shortly after the Australia on the Map Division was formed and became part of the Australasian Hydrographic Society structure.

== Activities ==
The Australia on the Map Division is a voluntary organisation which engages in a range of activities to promote its vision and aims in the areas of Commemorative Infrastructure, Commemorative Events, Heritage Projects, Research Projects, Research Promotion, Education Projects, (Curriculum and Capacity, Publicity and Promotion) and Strategic Activities.

The Australia on the Map Division website is an important educational tool for the organisation. It features what is known as the landings list, which provides a brief entry on every episode of contact and other significant cartographic developments from 1606 to 1814. It also carries the only online translation of the original 1602 VOC Charter of the Verenigde Oostindische Compagnie ('Dutch East India Company', abbreviated to VOC), developed as a result research project.

The Australia on the Map Division had significant input into the process of the development of a National Education Curriculum. Through its publicity and promotion activities, the Australia on the Map Division has help to facilitate one documentary, and is assisting a number of other documentaries in development.

Commemorative Infrastructure being promoted by the Australia on the Map Division includes the concepts an Explorers Commemorative Area in the Parliamentary Triangle in Canberra and a National Events Corporation. Research Projects undertaken by the Australia on the Map Division include the online translation of the VOC Charter and the current Search for the Deadwater Wreck.

== Commemorations ==
Australia on the Map endeavours to foster commemorations of significant landmarks in early Australian history. In 2011 it promoted the 200th anniversary of the publication of the first full map of Australia in 1811 by Louis de Freycinet.

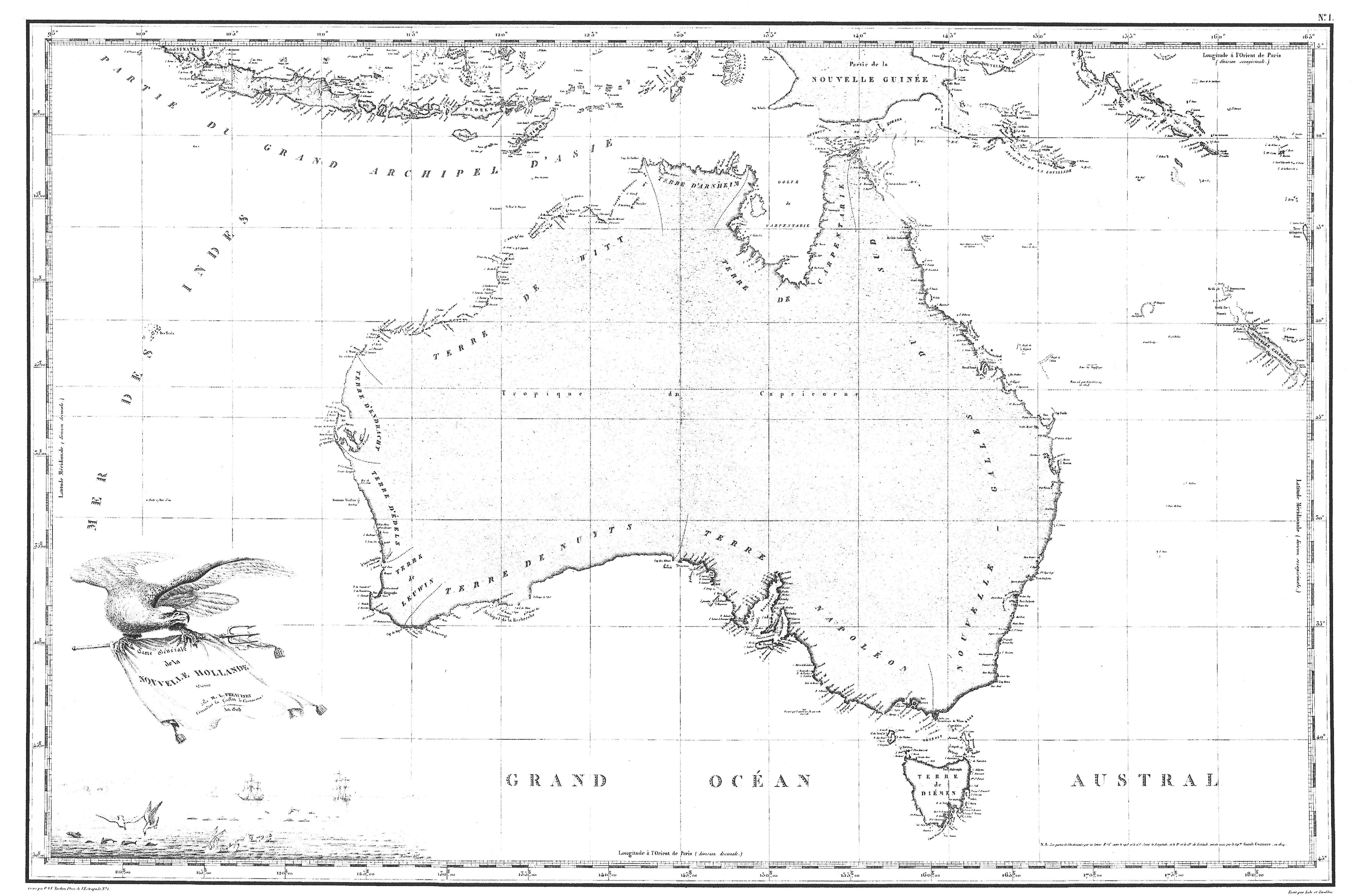
Freycinet Map of 1811, the first full map of Australia to be published

The resulted in special exhibitions at the State Library of New South Wales, and numerous papers being given at various conferences and published in journals. Two events were highlights of the commemorations. The first was a presentation by Henry de Freycinet, the last male descendant of the de Freycinet family, of a signed copy of the original map to the Governor-General of Australia, Quentin Bryce on 16 June 2011.

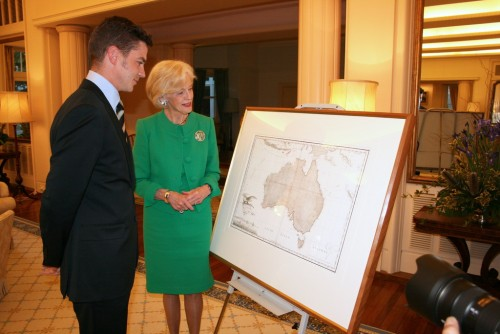
Henry de Freycinet presenting a copy of the 1811 Freycinet Map to Governor-General Quentin Bryce

The second was a symposium, The Freycinet Map of 1811 – 200th Anniversary of the Publication of the First Map of Australia, held at the National Library of Australia on 19 June 2011. This event involved close collaboration between the Australia on the Map Division, the National Library of Australia and the French Embassy and was addressed by the most eminent French scholars in Australia.

== Other activities ==
While Australia on the Map continued to publish its quarterly newsletter Map Matters and maintains its website, it has been engaged in commemorations to mark the 300th anniversary in 2012 of the sinking of Zuytdorp on the coast of Western Australia in 1712 and commemorative activities for the 200th anniversary of the publication of Matthew Flinders' 1814 map of Australia, Terra Australis (Australia). Also, lectures were delivered and articles published in 2016 to mark the first European contact with the west coast of Australia by the visit of Dirk Hartog in the Eendracht in 1616. It was on this historic occasion that Hartog left the famous Hartog Plate. Activities planned to draw further attention in 2020 to the charting of the east coast by James Cook, were unfortunately hampered by the turning up of the coronavirus, but presentations at a well attended function with excursions had been held at Mallacoota (near which Cook first saw the Australian coast) to commemorate Cook's leaving of Plymouth on his first voyage to the Pacific precisely 250 years before that day.

== General references ==
- Reynders, P.; Gerritsen, R. (2002). 2006:The Commemoration of the 400th Anniversary of the 'Discovery' of Australia: A Report on Workshop, Held in the Friends Lounge, National Library of Australia 3 October 2002 (Report). Canberra: National Initiative Working Group.
- Gerritsen, R., ed. (2009). A Translation of the Charter of the Dutch East Indies Company (Verenigde Oostindische Compagnie or VOC): Granted by the State General of the United Netherlands, 20 March 1602. Translated by Reynders, P. Canberra: Australia on the Map Division of the Australasian Hydrographic Society.
