= Vexillum adelense =

Scientific classification
- Kingdom: Animalia
- Phylum: Mollusca
- Class: Gastropoda
- Subclass: Caenogastropoda
- Order: Neogastropoda
- Superfamily: Turbinelloidea
- Family: Costellariidae
- Genus: Vexillum
- Species: V. adelense

Binomial name
- Vexillum adelense Marrow, 2019

Species of gastropod

Vexillum adelense is a species of small sea snail, marine gastropod mollusk in the family Costellariidae, the ribbed miters.

== Description ==
The length of the shell attains 16.2 mm.

== Distribution ==
This marine species was found off Adele Island, Kimberley, Western Australia.
