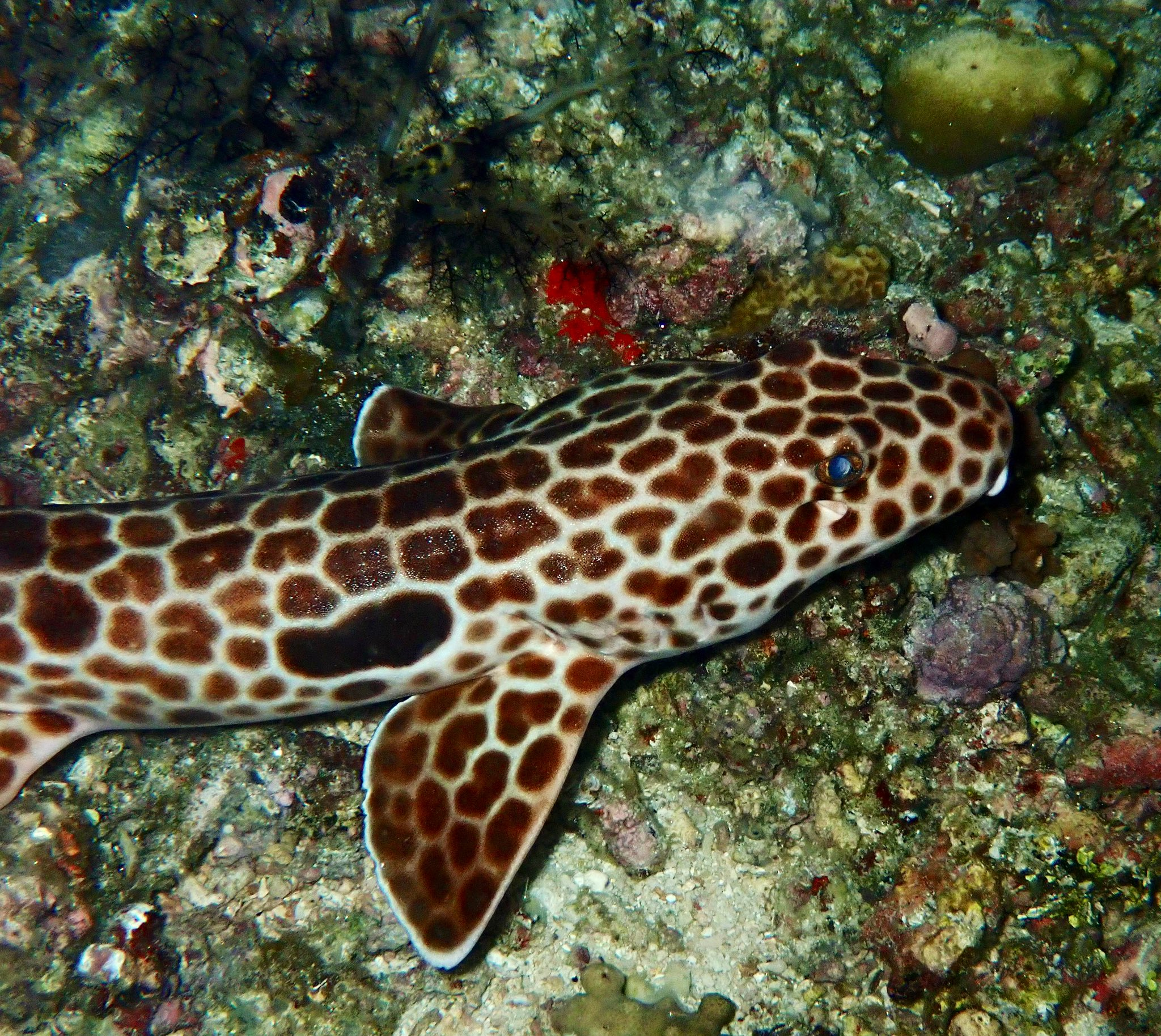

Conservation status
- Vulnerable (IUCN 3.1)

Scientific classification
- Kingdom: Animalia
- Phylum: Chordata
- Class: Chondrichthyes
- Subclass: Elasmobranchii
- Division: Selachii
- Order: Orectolobiformes
- Family: Hemiscylliidae
- Genus: Hemiscyllium
- Species: H. michaeli

Binomial name
- Hemiscyllium michaeli G. R. Allen & Dudgeon, 2010
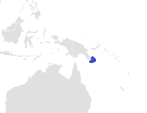
- Known range of the leopard epaulette shark (in blue)

= Leopard epaulette shark =

Species of bamboo shark

The leopard epaulette shark (Hemiscyllium michaeli), also known as the Milne Bay epaulette shark and Michael's epaulette shark, is a species of bamboo shark in the genus Hemiscyllium. It is a tropical shark known from the shallow ocean in the Milne Bay region of eastern Papua New Guinea. The epaulette sharks of this region have long been confused with the Indonesian speckled carpetshark (H. freycineti), and it was only in 2010 that H. michaeli was described as a separate species by Gerald R. Allen and Christine L. Dudgeon. It can reach a maximum length of 82 cm (32.3 in). Confusingly, some books with illustrations and photos labelled as H. freycineti actually show H. michaeli.

== Etymology ==
The leopard epaulette shark was originally confused with the Indonesian speckled carpetshark, until photographer and aquarist Scott W. Michael recognized that they were distinct species and brought this to the attention of researchers. The shark was subsequently named in honour of Michael, and for his contributions of information and photographs to Allen's research on Indo-Pacific fishes. Another common name for this species is the Milne Bay epaulette shark. In the paper by Allen and Dudgeon, it is said that the two populations are geographically separated by approximately 1,200 km.

== Distribution and habitat ==
The range of the leopard epaulette shark is confined to eastern Papua New Guinea, with most observations and collecting records from the Milne Bay province. It has also been collected at Oro Province in the vicinity of Harvey Bay. It is unclear if the distribution of the leopard epaulette shark extends along the Papua New Guinea mainland northwest towards Bootless Inlet, nor where its distribution abuts that of the Papuan epaulette shark (Hemiscyllium hallstromi). The presence of Hemiscyllium in the Huon Gulf is unknown; presumably the large estuarine area around Lae may provide sufficient habitat disjunction to separate H. michaeli and the Hooded epaulette shark (Hemiscyllium strahani).

The leopard epaulette shark is found in shallow water to a maximum depth of 20 m (66 ft) in fringing and patch tropical coral reefs, rocky outcrops, tidal pools, and seagrass beds.

== Description ==
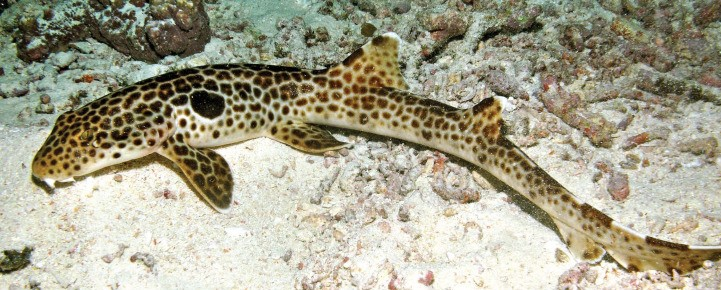
Leopard epaulette sharks are named for the brilliant leopard-like pattern covering their body.

The leopard epaulette shark has an elongated body, over half of which is comprised by the slender caudal peduncle. Its dorsal fin and anal fin is set very far back on an extremely long, thick tail. It differs from other Hemiscyllium species by having a shorter first dorsal fin and anal fin base, and lower anal fin.

The eyes are oval in shape and elevated, with a large spiracle below each. The five pairs of gill slits are small, with the fourth and fifth very close together.

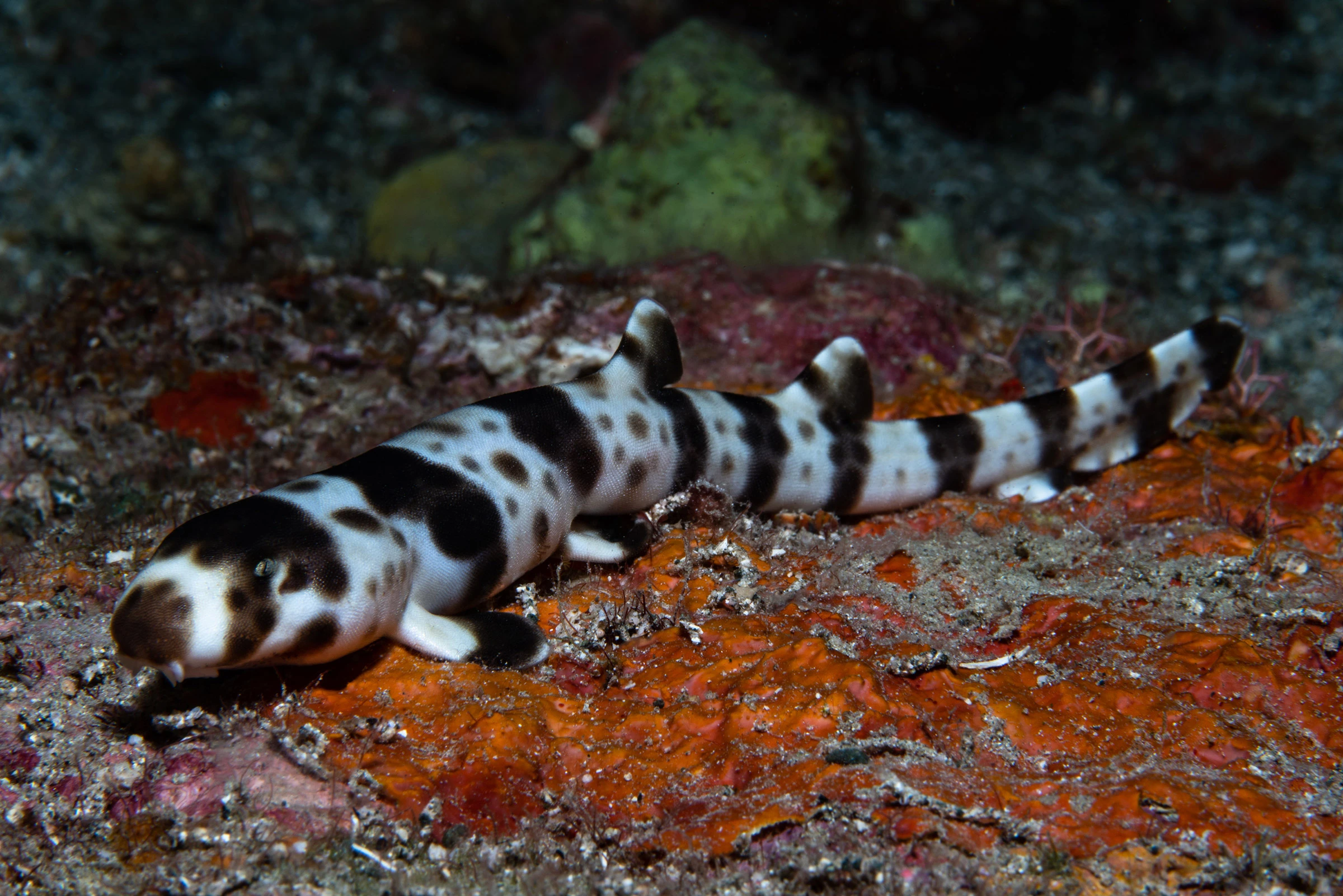
A juvenile of this species, showing the stark difference present between juveniles and adults

This species of Hemiscyllium is characterized by its unique colour pattern, which includes dense leopard-like spotting covering the body and a noticeable large black ocellated spot behind the head. It is similar in appearance to H. freycineti but can be differentiated by having denser and more leopard-like dark spots, a larger and well-developed post-cephalic ocellus, and a greater number of spots on the snout's dorsal surface. The overall coloration is whitish to pale grey-brown, with a dense network of leopard-like brown spots on the head, body, and fins. There is a distinct white-rimmed dark-brown mark behind the head, roughly aligned with the posterior edge of the pectoral fin. Sometimes, a series of about 9-10 bars may be faintly visible on the sides and more prominent on the tail. The dorsal fins feature 2–3 prominent saddle-like markings along their edges. Subadults of this species lack leopard-like spots and instead have solid spots on their head, body, and fins. Juveniles of this species display a predominantly white coloration with a number of dark brown bars, including on the head and caudal fin. There are a few small brown spots on the head and anterior body, situated within pale areas. Despite being partially merged with the second dark bar, the distinct large ocellus characteristic of the species is still evident.

The snout is short and rounded, with the nares placed almost at the tip along with a pair of tiny barbels; there are grooves running from the nares to the mouth. There are possibly 26–35 tooth rows in the upper jaw and 21–32 tooth rows in the lower jaw. The teeth are small, with broad bases and triangular cusps.

Leopard epaulette sharks are typically 60–78 cm (23.6–30.7 in) long; the maximum reported length is at least 82 cm (32.3 in).

== Biology and ecology ==
Although this species is critically understudied, we still know that as an adaptation for navigating its complex reef environment, like other members of the Hemiscyllium genus, the leopard epaulette shark moves by seemingly walking, bending its body from side-to-side and pushing off of the substrate with its paddle-shaped pectoral and pelvic fins. Its gait is similar to that of salamanders, an example of convergent evolution. The shark is capable of swimming, but often prefers to walk along the sandy or coral bottom even when the water is deep enough to allow it to swim freely. The cartilaginous supports of the shark's paired fins are reduced and separated when compared to other sharks, allowing them to be rotated for use as limbs. This mode of locomotion even enables the shark to crawl out of the water to access isolated tidal pools. The gait of the epaulette shark is convergently similar to those of tetrapods such as salamanders, suggesting that the movements needed for walking on land may predate, and facilitated the evolution of, the first terrestrial vertebrates. Leopard epaulette sharks are largely nocturnal and are most active in low water. They often hide inside or below coral heads, though it is enough for the head to be covered even if the rest of the body is exposed. Sometimes they perch in the open on sandy flats or atop reefs facing into the current, a form of orientation known as rheotaxis that may improve respiration or predator awareness.

The first-ever footage of a leopard epaulette shark leaving the water and walking on land was captured by wildlife biologist and rare species expert Forrest Galante.

The footage was shown as part of a documentary called Island of the Walking Sharks, co-hosted by fellow marine biologist Vicky Vásquez. The documentary was released as part of Shark Week 2022. The footage was the first time in history one of the Papuan species of Epaulette had been recorded and filmed walking out of the water. The documentary further focused on the other two Papuan epaulettes, the Papuan epaulette shark and the hooded epaulette shark.

== Comparisons ==
Due to the similarity of colour pattern and a misunderstanding of the geographic range, this species was long confused with H. freycineti. Due to sub-adults and some adults not developing the full leopard pattern, the species can also be confused with H. hallstromi.

In a blog post, Scott W. Michael postulated that "two new species" of the leopard epaulette shark could be present "off the coast of Milne Bay Province." He compared an observation by Rob van der Loos off a resort in Milne Bay with an observation he had made 100 km southeast.

He suggested that the differences in coloration, particularly the epaulette over the pectoral fin, could give rise to the possibility of there being two epaulette species off the coast of Milne Bay Province, and speculates that the observed differences in colouration may be attributed to the age of the shark specimen. He further added that while colour differences may not always be a reliable indicator for distinguishing fish species, it appears to be a consistent characteristic for differentiating members within the Hemiscyllium genus. He further proposed that further investigation involving shark DNA analysis by Dr. Allen and the passage of time will provide more conclusive information.

== Human interactions ==
Leopard epaulette sharks are harmless to humans, though if handled they may nip their captors. Due to their restricted range, they experience habitat degradation, and capture for food in artisanal fisheries. They could possibly enter the aquarium trade.
