= Rose de Freycinet =

French explorer and diarist

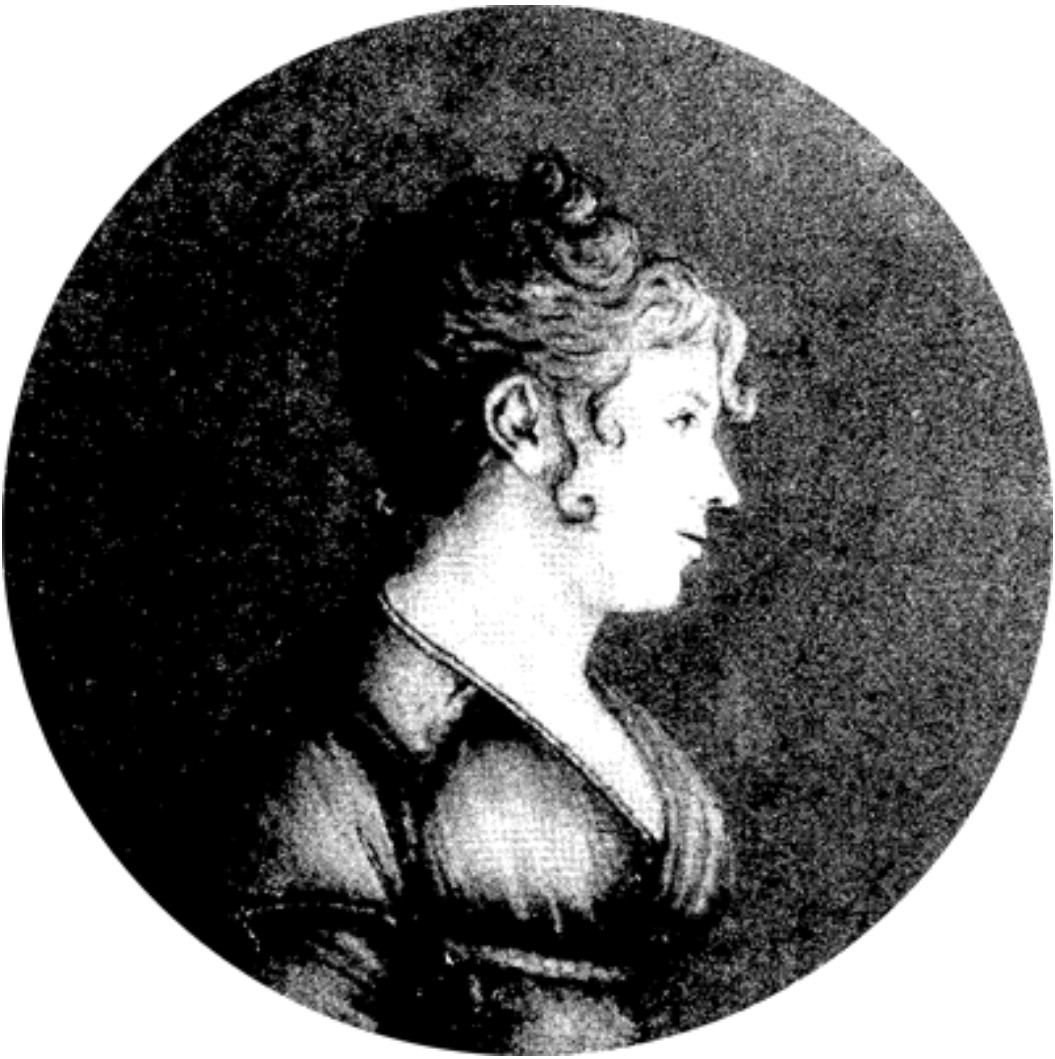
Rose Marie Pinon, later de Freycinet, Paris, 1812, aged 17. From an engraving of the original portrait in the possession of Baron Claude de Freycinet.

Rose de Freycinet, born Rose Pinon (1794 – 7 May 1832), was a Frenchwoman who, in the company of her husband, Louis de Freycinet, sailed around the world between 1817 and 1820 on a French scientific expedition on a military ship, initially disguised as a man. While not the first woman to circumnavigate the world, she was the first to record her experiences, in a diary. Being not intended for publication and being both frank and personal musings about people, places and events, her writings represent an important anthropological resource.

== Biography ==
=== Early years ===
De Freycinet was born Rose Pinon in Saint-Julien-du-Sault, in the Yonne department. Her father was Étienne Pinon, a bank clerk from a family with Royalist connections, who married Jeanne Catherine, née Tauzin, the daughter of a coach-builder, in Paris in 1791. After being widowed, Jeanne Pinon ran a boarding school for girls. Rose was educated in that school, along with some 40 young ladies from Paris.

Rose was the oldest daughter. Her father died while she was relatively young, followed by her brother, leaving Rose with the responsibility of looking after her younger sister, Stéphanie, who later took a job as a governess in Mauritius in 1818; Stéphanie married a civil servant, M. Maillard, who later repudiated her.

=== Marriage to de Freycinet ===
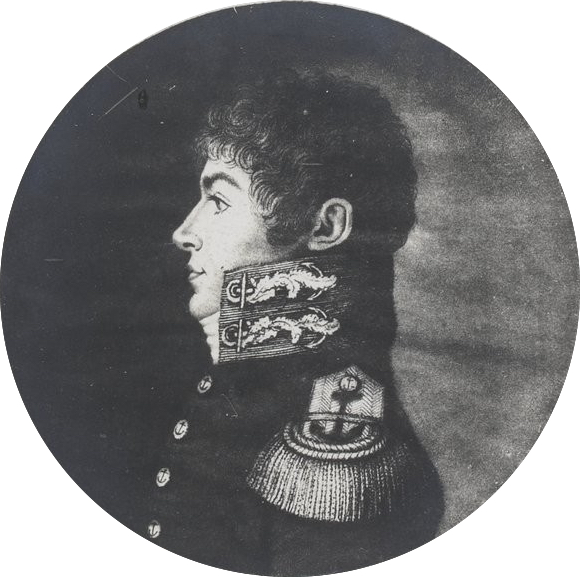
Louis de Freycinet.

At age 19, Rose married 35-year-old Louis Claude de Saulces de Freycinet, a member of the French aristocracy. The difference in social class proved no impediment for a happy marriage; by all accounts, her in-laws loved and respected her, and throughout her life, Rose maintained an animated correspondence with her in-laws, wherever her travels took her. Over the course of her journey she also corresponded with her mother, Madame Pinon, whom she missed dearly, especially because her departure meant her mother was separated from all of her children.

=== Aboard the Uranie ===
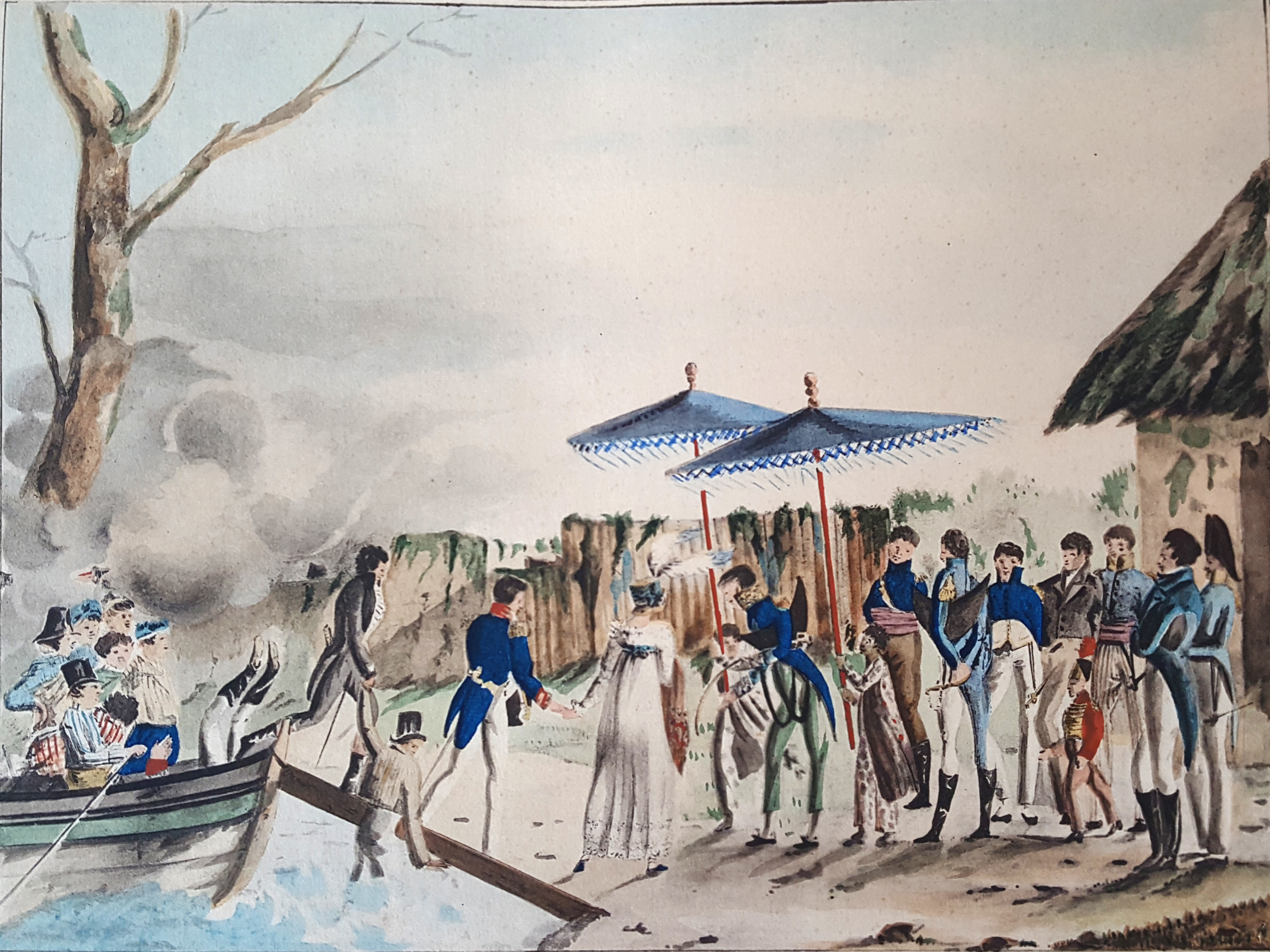
Rose de Freycinet at Timor, 1819

Louis de Freycinet had earlier participated in the Baudin voyage that produced the first map of the Australian coastline in the period 1802–03. It is on that voyage he would have been aware of his leader Nicolas Baudin's meeting with Matthew Flinders and of their virtually simultaneous proving that New Holland of the Dutch and New South Wales of Cook was part of one island continent Australia. Displaying considerable cartographic skill, when Baudin's second ship was sent home under Jacques Hamelin laden with specimens and records, de Freycinet was elevated above others to command Casuarina, a small vessel purchased in order to continue the surveys.

After the death of both Baudin and the voyage anthropologist François Peron who attempted to complete the account, and finalising an account of the voyage, in 1817 he was given command of the Uranie on an expedition under the auspices of the French Navy and the Ministry of the Interior, in which Louis Isidore Duperrey, Jacques Arago, Adrien Taunay the Younger, and others went to Rio de Janeiro to perform various scientific measurements and to collect specimens in natural history. Rose Pinon and he were newly wed; perhaps aware of Flinder's imprisonment and his enforced separation from his wife Ann, they conspired to avoid a similar fate aboard. Dressed in men's clothes; Rose de Freycinet became the first woman to write an account of her experiences circumnavigating the world.

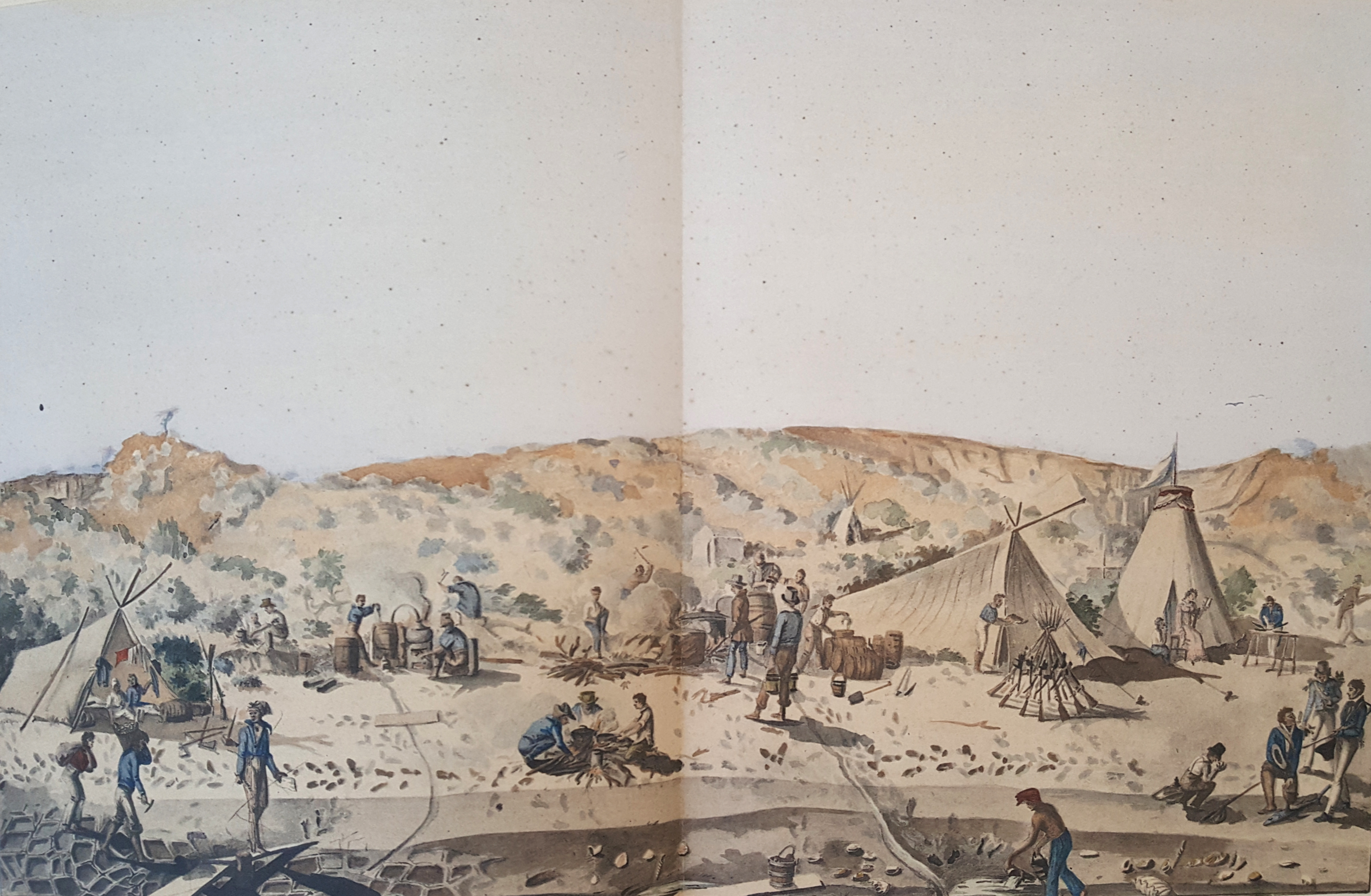
Rose in front of the tent to the right of the observatory, Shark Bay, Western Australia, 1819

To prepare the ship for his wife's presence, de Freycinet had the living quarters of the corvette renovated (they were refurbished and extended, even at the expense of the ship's navigability), and much attention was paid to hygienic standards aboard the ship, food safety, and health.

Apparently, becoming a stowaway was Rose's own idea; she may have hatched the plan as early as 1815, and probably solidified her scheme after her husband received approval for the expedition, in October 1816. She went on board on 16 September 1817; report of her presence reached the French media soon after, leading to sensational reports in the press and "indignation in official circles."

The presence of women aboard Navy vessels was illegal, and it is possible that the Navy, the Ministry of the Interior, and the press learned of Rose's presence from an officer who was removed to make way for her. At any rate, Rose initially dressed as a man, and even visited the governor of Gibraltar dressed in "a blue frock-coat with trousers to match."

The Navy was powerless since the first French port of call for the Uranie was Réunion, in the Indian Ocean, which was not reached until 1818. When the ship did land there, the local governor was unable or unwilling to act, swayed as he was, according to Rose, by her husband's arguments and her charm.

The expedition brought back a great number of scientific specimens, including minerals, plants, insects, animals, despite the shipwreck of the Uranie in 1820 in the Falkland Islands. A court-martial that investigated the shipwreck, in 1820, never mentioned Rose's presence. According to Jacques Arago, the artist who had been hired to do botanical and other illustrations and who was the only civilian on board, during the shipwreck Rose de Freycinet behaved herself admirably. Her diary, however, was not published until 1927.

=== Death ===
In Paris, 1832, Louis fell ill with cholera. With Dr. Gaimard, who had also traveled aboard the Uranie, Rose nursed him back to health, even though she suffered from a stomach ailment. However, she herself became ill, and died on 7 May 1832.

== Legacy and publications ==
=== Journal and Letters ===
- Rose de Freycinet's journal was written expressly for her friend Caroline de Nanteuil and does not seem intended for publication. The journal comprises three small volumes with original notebook wrappers bound as one. Each is numbered individually at the top left-hand side of each page. It is written in ink in Rose's own hand on 132 pages (46, 44, 42 pages), with 18 of them left blank. The State Library of New South Wales has made a digitised version of the journal available online. de Freycinet, Rose. "Journal particulier de Rose pour Caroline, September 1817 – October 1820" (1817-1820) [original journals bound]. Rose de Freycinet Journal and Letters, Series: SAFE/MLMSS 9158/vol. 1. NSW, Australia: State Library of New South Wales Collection, State Library of New South Wales.
- The second account of the voyage is through a series of 15 letters (a folio, of about 30,000 words on 206 pages with 13 left blank) written to her mother, Madame Pinon during the voyage. While the original letters did not survive, Louis had copied these out after Rose's death in 1832. The State Library of New South Wales has made a digitised version of the journal available online. de Freycinet, Rose. "Lettres de Mme. Louis de Freycinet ecrites pendant le voyage autour du Monde de la Corvette l'Uranie, 1817–1819, transcribed and edited by Louis-Claude de Saulces de Freycinet, after 1820 and before 1842" (1817-1819) [original writing papers bound]. Rose de Freycinet Journal and Letters, Series: SAFE/MLMSS 9158/vol. 2. NSW, Australia: State Library of New South Wales Collection, State Library of New South Wales.

=== Publications ===
- Federico Motta, Sous des cieux inconnus - Le voyage autour du monde de Rose de Freycinet (1817-1820) - Le journal annoté, l’analyse de Rose en femme de son époque, et les questions historiques du voyage de l’Uranie, July 2026. DOI: 10.5281/zenodo.18865062 ; 10.6084/m9.figshare.31496554.
- Freycinet, R., Duplomb, C., & Pinon, L. (1927). Campagne de l' "Uranie"(1817–1820) : Journal...d'après le manuscrit original accampangé de notes / par Charles Duplomb : [illust. and appxs.]. Paris: Societe d' Editions, 8994985 (National Bibliographic Database (ANBD))
- Rose de Freycinet's life and adventures were recounted by Marnie Bassett, Realms and Islands (1962)
- An English translation of the text was made by Marc Serge Rivière in 2003, Rivière, Marc Serge (2003). A woman of courage: The journal of Rose de Freycinet on her voyage around the world, 1817–1820. National Library Australia. pp. xi–xxiv. ISBN 978-0-642-10767-1.
- Freycinet, Rose Marie de, d. 1832. (n.d.). Journal of a Voyage round the World, 1817-1820 by Rose Marie De Saulces Freycinet: A Translation into English by Sir William Dixson. A digitised version of the journal has been made available online by The State Library of New South Wales DLSPENCER 139.
- Rose de Freycinet (née Pinon) and Federico Motta (curator), Una viaggiatrice clandestina a bordo dell’Uranie negli anni 1817–20, Verona, June 2017. Italian translation of Rose’s original journal, fully annotated and accompanied by new documents.
- McCarthy, Michael (2005). "Rose de Freycinet and the French Exploration Corvette L'Uranie (1820): a Highlight of the 'French Connection' with the 'Great Southland'". International Journal of Nautical Archaeology. 34 (1): 62–78. doi:10.1111/j.1095-9270.2005.00044.x.
- Falkiner, Suzanne (2022) ROSE The story of Rose de Freycinet, the first woman to circumnavigate the world and leave a written account of her journey, ABC Books/HarperCollins, history, biography

=== Legacy ===
- Rose de Freycinet's name is remembered in the Rose Atoll, in what is now American Samoa, named for her by her husband in 1819 and a dove the Pinon's imperial pigeon. Her diary was not published until 1927.
- Paintings by the expedition's artist, Jacques Arago, attest to her presence ashore in Australia at various places including Shark Bay, Western Australia and later in Sydney.
- Interest in her and her diary led to a renewed interest in the wreck of the Uranie in the Falkland Islands. In 2001 an expedition organized by the Western Australian Museum "conducted research, search and survey aimed at adding to the body of knowledge about the de Freycinet's, their ship and their camp." The wreck was relocated and a report into the extensive survivor's camp and the wreck was prepared.
