= Rupert Gerritsen =

Australian historian

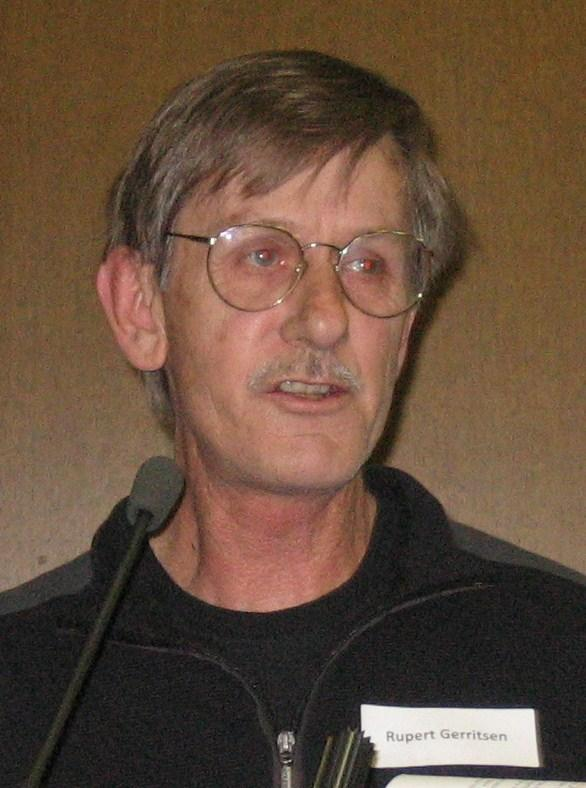
Rupert Gerritsen

Rupert Gerritsen (1953 – 3 November 2013) was an Australian historian and a noted authority on Indigenous Australian prehistory. Coupled with his work on early Australian cartography, he played an influential part in re-charting Australian history prior to its settlement by the British in 1788, and noted evidence of agriculture and settlements on the continent before the arrival of European settlers.

== Early years ==
Rupert Gerritsen was born in the Western Australian town of Geraldton, in 1953, of Dutch parents. He grew up in Geraldton, where he experienced first hand the excitement of the discovery of the wreck of the Batavia in 1963 and came to know some of those involved in its discovery and the discovery of other 17th and 18th century shipwrecks on the coast of Western Australia.

From the 1960s through to the 1980s he was involved in radical politics, anti-conscription, and social activism.

In 1972 he placed a bomb in the Perth office of the Department of Labour and National Service. According to his obituary, it was timed to go off in the early hours when the offices should be empty, and was aimed at destroying conscription files. The crude bomb failed to detonate. After the attempted bombing, he fled to Melbourne where he was arrested and extradited to Western Australia. While on bail he fled to New Zealand where he was caught and was again extradited back to Western Australia. At trial he pled guilty to placing the bomb and served a one-year prison sentence.

Professionally he was engaged for many years in Western Australia and the Australian Capital Territory in youth work, community work and mental health, and specialised in developmental work.

== Indigenous prehistory and early Australian historical research ==
And Their Ghosts May Be Heard (1994) is a detailed exploration of the fate of the Dutch mariners cast away on the Western Australian coast in the 1600s and early 1700s.

Gerritsen claimed that some 16% of Nhanda, an Aboriginal language of the central west coast of Western Australia, was apparently derived from Dutch as a result of interaction with marooned sailors. This discovery led to major reevaluations of the perceptions of the early prehistory, in that Aboriginal Australians were not mute witnesses to the unfolding events of history but active participants who embraced parts of European culture long before the British settlement of the continent. However, the claim that there is an identifiable Dutch influence on the Nhanda language has been strongly refuted by linguists who have studied it.

Gerritsen also researched the location where two mutineers from the Batavia mutiny, possibly Australia's first European settlers, were marooned on 16 November 1629. As a consequence of his research Gerritsen established that Hutt River, 500 kilometres (310 mi) north of Perth, was the site where Wouter Loos and Jan Pelgrom de Bye first set foot on mainland Australia. These discoveries wrought a complete change in the methodology of recording Western Australian pre-history. Many subsequent scholars have embraced this new historical paradigm in their works.

After the appearance of Ghosts, Gerritsen published a range of papers and monographs in diverse fields, from archaeology to historical linguistics.

Australia and the Origins of Agriculture put forward evidence that some Indigenous Australian groups in traditional circumstances were engaged in food production, including agriculture, and lived in large permanent settlements.

== Other research ==
- Identification of the oldest ceremonial object in the world, a 28,000-year-old cylcon found at Cuddie Springs.
- Ethnographic and ethnogenic evidence of interaction between Indigenous Australians and megafauna.
- A study of the global prehistory of water craft and island colonisation, leading to a new theory on the original colonisation of Australia.
- Various co-authored papers on the Freycinet Map of 1811, the first full map of Australia to be published, and identifying the first world map showing a full map of Australia, published in 1810.
- A number of papers identifying events during the Batavia Mutiny in 1629 as the first criminal prosecutions, the first military conflict and the first naval engagements in Australian history.

Gerritsen was a Petherick Researcher at the National Library of Australia from April 1995, and focused his research and writing on early Australian history.

== Awards ==
In recognition of his work on Australian pre-history and its Dutch influence, in 2007, Beatrix of the Netherlands conferred upon Gerritsen the honour of Knight of the Order of Orange-Nassau.

In August 2012 Gerritsen was awarded the Dorothy Prescott Prize for the paper, "Getting the strait facts straight", he gave at the Brisbane International Geospatial Forum.

== Death and legacy ==
Gerritsen died in Canberra on Sunday 3 November 2013.

Australia and the Origins of Agriculture and other work by Gerritsen was influential in the shaping of Bruce Pascoe's acclaimed work, Dark Emu.

=== Australia on the Map ===
Gerritsen was co-founder, along with Peter Reynders, of Australia on the Map: 1606–2006, and was that organisation's National Secretary. At his death he was chair of its successor organisation, the Australia on the Map Division of the Australasian Hydrographic Society which aims to make Australians more aware of Australia's early history and heritage, beginning in 1606.

Under the Australia on the Map Division of the Australasian Hydrographic Society, Gerritsen had sole or joint responsibility for a number of projects, including the "Search for the Deadwater Wreck".

== Bibliography ==
- Early Records of the Wardandi language, 1998
- An anonymous account of a journey from Augusta to the Vasse in 1833, Unpublished, 1999
- Nhanda Villages of the Victoria District, Western Australia, 2002
- The Traditional Settlement Pattern in South West Victoria Reconsidered, 2000
- A Further Translation of Selected Chapters of Dr Erhard Eylmann's Die Eingeborenen der Kolonie Südaustralien (The Aborigines of the Colony of South Australia), Translated and transcribed by W.C. Gerritsen and Rupert Gerritsen, 2002
- And Their Ghosts May Be Heard ..., 1994 and 2nd ed. 2002
- Australia and the origins of agriculture. British Archaeological Reports S1874. Archaeopress. 2008.
- "The meaning of Morawa" (PDF). Placenames Australia: 1, 3, 7. June 2010.
- Australia's First Criminal Prosecutions in 1629, 2011
- Beyond the Frontier: Explorations in Ethnohistory, 2011
- The Freycinet Map of 1811: Proceedings of the Symposium Commemorating the 200th Anniversary of the Publication of the First Map of Australia (jointly edited with Robert King and Andrew Eliason)
