= Zuytdorp =

Dutch trading ship wrecked in Australia in 1712

Coordinates: 27°11′10″S 113°56′13″E

History

Dutch Republic
- Name: Zuytdorp
- Owner: Dutch East India Company
- Fate: Wrecked at the Zuytdorp Cliffs in 1712

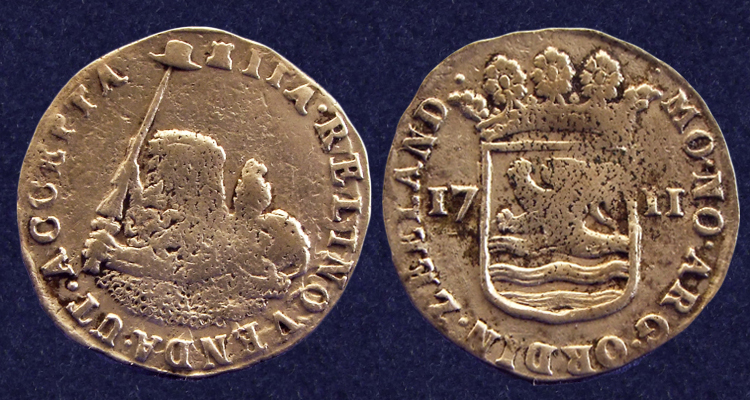
Recovered coins struck in 1711

Zuytdorp, also Zuiddorp (meaning 'South Village', after Zuiddorpe, an extant village in the south of Zeeland in the Netherlands, near the Belgian border) was an 18th-century trading ship of the Dutch East India Company (Vereenigde Oost-Indische Compagnie, commonly abbreviated VOC).

On 1 August 1711, Zuytdorp was dispatched from the Netherlands to the trading port of Batavia (now Jakarta, Indonesia) bearing a load of freshly minted silver coins. Many trading ships travelled the Brouwer Route, using the strong Roaring Forties winds to carry them across the Indian Ocean to within sight of the west coast of Australia (then called New Holland), whence they would turn north towards Batavia.

Zuytdorp did not arrive at its destination and was never heard from again. No search was undertaken, presumably because the VOC did not know whether or where the ship wrecked, or if it had been taken by pirates. Expensive efforts had been made previously to search for other missing ships, which had failed even when an approximate wreck location was known.

In the mid-20th century, the wreck of the Zuytdorp was identified on a remote part of the Western Australian coast, between Kalbarri and Shark Bay, approximately 40 kilometres (25 mi) north of the Murchison River. That section of coastline, subsequently named the Zuytdorp Cliffs, was the preserve of Aboriginal people and had been one of the last uncolonised areas until sheep stations were established there in the late 19th century. It has been speculated that survivors of the wreck may have traded with or intermarried with local Aboriginal communities between Kalbarri and Shark Bay.

The location of the wreck of the Zuytdorp off the coast of Western Australia

In 1834, there had been news of an unidentified shipwreck on the shore when Aboriginal people told a farmer near Perth about a wreck – the colonists presumed it was a recent wreck and sent rescue parties who failed to find it or any survivors. In 1927, wreckage was seen by an Indigenous-European family group (including Ada and Ernest Drage, Tom and Lurleen Pepper, Charlie Mallard) on a cliff top near the border of Murchison house and Tamala Stations. Bertie and Pearl Drage, Jack Brand and Mrs Brand, and two Aboriginal workers, including a man named Nyarda, are also understood to have been involved. Tamala Station head stockman Tom Pepper reported the find to the authorities, with their first visit to the site occurring in 1941. In 1954, Pepper gave Phillip Playford directions to the wreckage and Playford identified the relics as from Zuytdorp.

== First dives and salvage attempts ==
The first dive in May 1964, and the sighting of a massive silver deposit in 1967, resulted in successful salvage attempts by teams led by Tom Brady of Geraldton and Perth-based Alan Robinson. They utilised the services of Clive Daw, who had visited the site by land on other occasions.

== Western Australian Museum's work ==
In 1971, Harry Bingham and his chief diver, Geoff Kimpton, were successful in recovering silver and other materials, as was a team led by Jeremy Green in 1976 and on other occasions. On his successful dives, Green noted that looting had occurred just prior to his visit and a watch-keeper was installed in a caravan near the wreck. The Museum's salvage work ceased in 1981 due to the perceived dangers of working the site, near accidents while using the bush airstrip, and the burning of the caravan. Thereafter a watch-keeper was appointed to guard the site.

The site, one of the few restricted zones under the Commonwealth Historic Shipwrecks Act 1976 and Underwater Cultural Heritage Act 2018, still requires a permit to visit and is under regular surveillance.

When work recommenced in 1986, led by Michael McCarthy, with the museum's chief diver Geoff Kimpton, it was found that the silver had all but disappeared.

Soon afterwards, the program entered its multi-disciplinary phase, becoming the first of the Western Australian Museum’s VOC studies to embrace the practice. Geologist-historian Phillip Playford joined the team, as did pre-historians Sandra Bowdler, Kate Morse, terrestrial historical archaeologists including Fiona Weaver and Tom Pepper Jr., (representing station and Indigenous interests), surveyors, the Department of Land Administration, and artists. Oral histories were recorded with station identities, including relatives of the Pepper, Drage, Blood, Mallard and other Indigenous families involved with the wreck. Foremost in that new phase was the attention paid to the possibilities of European-Indigenous interaction, and the movement of survivors away from the wreck.

Phillip Playford's book, Carpet of Silver: The Wreck of the Zuytdorp was produced as part of the museum's research. Published in 1996, the book won the Western Australian Premier’s Book Award.

The museums in both Fremantle and at Geraldton presented exhibitions on the wreck, a website, and reports. An exhibition was also produced for the Kalbarri heritage centre. Due to the logistical difficulties and the advent of Health and Safety legislation, the Zuytdorp in-water program ceased in 2002, though work on land and in the laboratory remains active.

Historian Bill Bunbury reviewed the wreck and consequences in the chapter A Lost Ship – Lost People: The Zuytdorp Story in the book Caught in Time: Talking Australia History.

== Dutch-Aboriginal intermarriage theory and rock inscriptions ==
In 1988, an American woman who had married into the Mallard family contacted Phillip Playford and described how her husband had died some years before from a disease called variegate porphyria. She suggested to Playford there may be a connection to europeans because the illness was not an Australian indigenous populations disease. Playford found that the disease was genetically linked and initially confined to Afrikaners, and that all cases of the disease in South Africa were traceable to Gerrit Jansz and Ariaantjie Jacobs, who had married in Cape of Good Hope in 1688.

Zuytdorp had arrived at the Cape in March 1712, where it took on more than 100 new crew. One of the Jansz' sons could have boarded the ship at that time and thus become the carrier of the disease into the Australian Aboriginal population. In 2002, a DNA investigation into the hypothesis that a variegate porphyria mutation was introduced into the Aboriginal population by shipwrecked sailors, was undertaken at the Queen Elizabeth II Medical Centre in Nedlands, Western Australia, and the Stellenbosch University in South Africa. The research concluded the mutations were not inherited from shipwrecked sailors.

The idea that similar European genetic maladies in the Aboriginal population (such as Ellis–Van Creveld syndrome) had originated from VOC shipwreck survivors is also doubtful. Dutch–Indigenous links via the VOC wrecks are rendered less certain because of the movement of hundreds of divers to the Western Australian pearling field in the mid-to-late 19th century. Incorrectly called Malays, those indentured labourers came from the islands north of Australia, many via the port of Batavia. One vessel, the SS Xantho for example, brought 140 Malay boys aged 12–14 for the pearling field. They boarded at Batavia where diseases (including genetic diseases) had been introduced by VOC personnel into the local population since 1600. In addition, many Malay pearlers remained on the coast and some married Aboriginal people at Shark Bay. Therefore, it is possible that genetic links between Aboriginal Australians and the Dutch can be traced to those sources. The Macassans, who frequented northern Australian shores for centuries, and who mixed with the coastal Aboriginal people and even took some of them back to Macassar, are another possible source.

The possibility that Aboriginal groups who joined survivors from Zuytdorp or mutineers from Batavia inspired the Walga Rock ship painting was another popular belief. This theory has been challenged, because new evidence points to the image being of a steamship, possibly Xantho.

There was also renewed interest in the authenticity of rock inscriptions, predominantly one reading "Zuytdorp 1711" that was once visible on a rock-face adjacent to the reef platform at the site. Post-dating Phillip Playford's first visits in 1954–55, when photographs of the same area show no inscription. Now known to be a modern artefact, the inscription was erased.

== Commemorative plaque ==
In June 2012, the Shire of Northampton unveiled a commemorative plaque in Kalbarri commemorating the 300th anniversary of Zuytdorp's wreck. The plaque also mentions Batavia and Zeewijk, two other VOC ships that were wrecked in the area.

Ernie Dingo visited the site to learn more about his estranged father Tom Pepper Jr and his grandparents Tom Snr and Lurlie Pepper. This investigation appeared in a 2018 edition of Who Do You Think You Are.

== Recent research ==
Playford's book Carpet of Silver was reprinted unaltered in 1998 and 2006. The Western Australian Museum's account of this period appears as a chapter in a commemorative book about the VOC from 1606-2006 and a report produced in 2009.

After retiring from the Western Australian Museum in 2019, McCarthy sought to fill what he considered an information gap by providing a report compiling all that is known about the ship, the wreck and its aftermath. Presented in April 2024 to the Department of Maritime Heritage at the Western Australian Museum as an electronic report designed to be made available (subject to Aboriginal cultural requirements regarding images and the names of deceased), this roughly 500-page work contains McCarthy's research and links to all other known sources, databases and archives including those of the VOC, early explorers, salvage divers, Aboriginal families, scientists, linguists, the Western Australian Museum and other researchers and enthusiasts, including Playford whose archive was recently donated to the State Library of Western Australia.

== See also ==
- ANCODS, the Australian Netherlands Committee on Old Dutch Shipwrecks
- List of shipwrecks
- Concordia (1696 ship)
- Maritime archaeology
- Shipwrecks of Western Australia
- VOC ship Amsterdam
- Protected areas of Australia

== General references ==
- Gerritsen, Rupert (1994). And their Ghosts May Be Heard. Fremantle Arts Centre Press. ISBN 1-86368-063-2.
- McCarthy, Michael (comp), 2002 Chronological Precis of events occurring in Stage 3 of the WA Museum at the Zuytdorp site(s). For the ANCODS meeting December 2002. Stage 1 – The Bingham/Kimpton era: 1969–71; Stage 2 – The Green era: 1971–1985; Stage 3 – The McCarthy/Kimpton era. With assistance from many expert practitioners and volunteers, including Prof Sandra Bowdler, Dr Richard Cassells, Mr Stanley Hewitt, Dr Kate Morse, Dr Phillip Playford, Mr Bob Sheppard, Staff of the Department of Land Administration, Mr Ross White, Ms Fiona Weaver. 1986–2002. Report – Department of Maritime Archaeology. Western Australian Maritime Museum, No. 173
- McCarthy, Michael (2004). Green, J.; Gainsford, M.; Stanbury, M. (eds.). "Zuytdorp". Department of Maritime Archaeology, Western Australian Maritime Museum. A Compendium of Projects, Programs and Publications (9, Special Publication). Australian National Centre of Excellence for Maritime Archaeology: 65.
