= Adele Island (Western Australia) =

Island in Western Australia

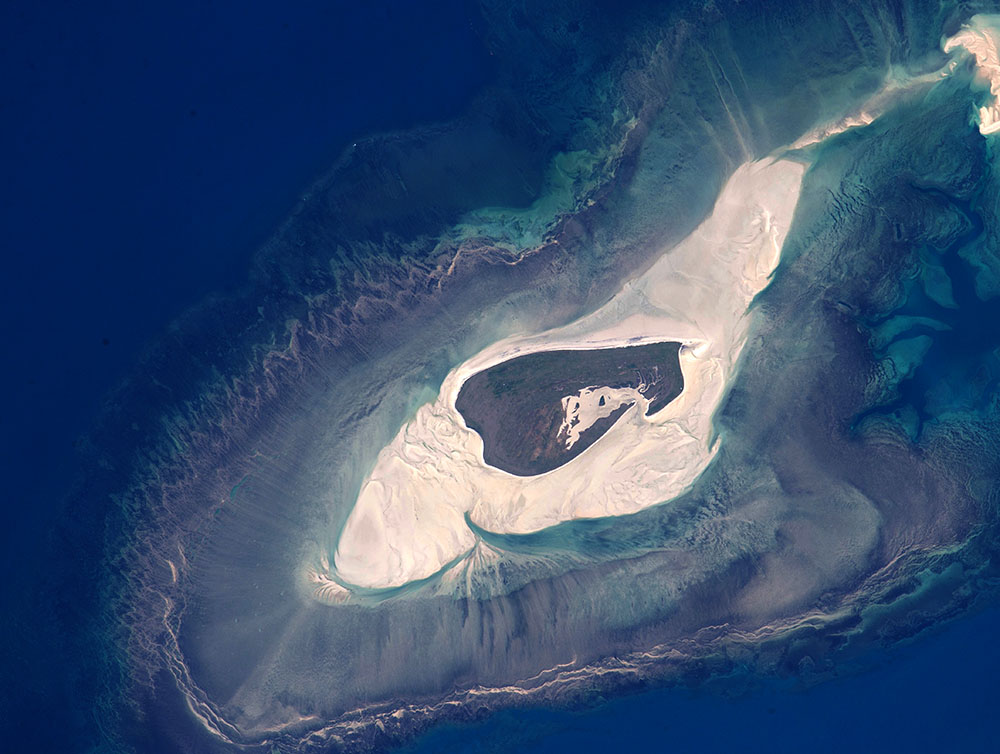
- Satellite image of Adele Island

- Location of Adele Island

Geography
- Coordinates: 15.5242°S 123.1573°E
- Area: 217 ha (540 acres)
- Length: 2.9 km (1.8 mi)
- Width: 1.6 km (0.99 mi)

Administration
- Australia

Demographics
- Population: 0

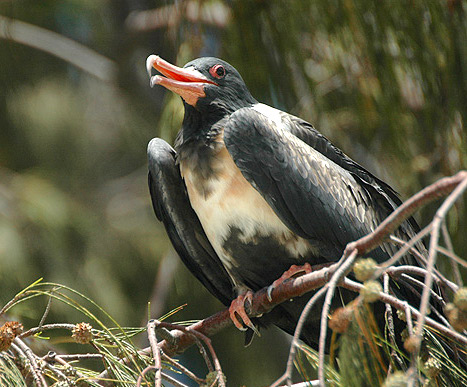
Adele Island is a breeding site of world importance for Lesser frigatebird

Adele Island is an uninhabited small island located in the Indian Ocean approximately 104 kilometres (65 mi) north of Ardyaloon off the Kimberley coast in Western Australia.

== Description ==
The island is fish-hook shaped and has a length of 2.9 kilometres (2 mi) and a width of 1.6 kilometres (1 mi) and a total area of 217 hectares (536 acres). It is low-lying and surrounded by extensive sandbanks lying over a limestone platform forming a large lagoon.

== History ==
Nicolas Baudin named the island in 1801 as part of his expedition around Australia. (Note: Some sources state that Baudin discovered the island, but this is highly debatable and in reality highly unlikely. Australia was visited by Dutch explorers in the 17th century (hence "New Holland") and later, in 1699, by William Dampier after whom the Dampier Archipelago is named. Dampier sailed northwards along the western coast towards Timor passing many islands on the way. Also, it should not be forgotten that fishing fleets from Indonesia, especially Makassan trepangers, have a long history of visiting the Australia coast.) The name of the island was first charted on the Freycinet Map of 1811. The Adele Island Nature Reserve was gazetted on 1 December 2000, has a size of 2.17 square kilometres (0.84 mi^{2}), is located within the Northern Kimberley bioregion, and was declared in recognition of its status as a bird breeding sanctuary. Since then the Department of Environment and Conservation has embarked on a campaign to eradicate the island of the Polynesian rats that are a constant threat to the native seabirds.

An acetylene-powered lighthouse was built on the island in 1951; it was later upgraded to solar power in 1985.

In 2025 a group of about 70 visiting cruise ship passengers and 10 guides were briefly stranded on the island when quickly rising tides separated them from their Zodiac inflatable boats.

== Birds ==
The island is classified by BirdLife International as an Important Bird Area for its seabirds and waders. As well as breeding cormorants and Australian pelicans, globally important bird species breeding or staging on the island are lesser frigatebird with 2000–5700 breeding pairs, brown booby with 1500–8500 breeding pairs, grey-tailed tattler with up to 5500 individuals, and red-necked stint with up to 4100 individuals.

== Rolloliths ==
Rollolith is also found in Adele Island. It is the basic name given to benthic creatures. Rolloliths can be made of barnacles (balanuliths); coral (corallith); vermetulid worms (vermetuliths); red crustose coralline green growth (rhodolith); or bryozoans (bryoliths).
