= Phillip Playford =

Australian geologist (1931 – 2017)

Phillip Playford AM
- Born: 27 November 1931; Guildford, Western Australia
- Died: 12 July 2017 (aged 85); Booragoon, Western Australia

Phillip Elliott Playford AM (27 November 1931 – 12 July 2017) was an Australian geologist who made important contributions to sedimentary geology, oil exploration in Western Australia, maritime history, and made contributions to the recording of Aboriginal art and culture from the north of Western Australia.

== Geology ==
=== Petroleum exploration ===
In 1958 a major multi-author publication laid the foundation of the modern understanding of the stratigraphy of the major sedimentary basins of Western Australia, enabling oil exploration to occur. The following year Playford and Murray Johnstone prepared a paper for the American Association of Petroleum Geologists summarising the status of oil exploration in Australia. This paper played as significant role in increasing international awareness of Australia's petroleum potential.

Documentation of the Devonian Reef, led by Playford, stimulated exploration which led to the Blina and associated oil fields. Detailed knowledge of the Carnarvon Basin, Playford's life work, eventually led to the discovery of the Barrow Island oilfield, which in turn was a trigger for the spread for the exploration of the offshore, now the most active area in Australia. Work on the geology of the Perth Basin, led by Playford, provided a basis for the exploration which eventually led to the discovery of the Dongara and other gas fields.

=== Canning Basin ===
Playford's major work has been on the Devonian Reef complexes of the Canning Basin, first publishing a Geological Survey of Western Australia bulletin on their geology in 1996. Regular updates on the geology of the Devonian Reef complexes continued even while working in leadership roles in the Department of Mines and Petroleum in the 1980s and 1990s. This, together with the supervision of PhD and postgraduate projects from universities around the world, culminated in the publication in 2009 of a major publication. The Devonian Reef complexes form a spectacular belt of rugged limestone ranges that extends for 350 kilometres (220 mi) along the northern edge of Western Australia's Canning Basin. These complexes are regarded as the world's best example of an exposed ancient barrier reef system, and have become known as the Devonian Great Barrier Reef. The rocks regarded as a model for similar reefs that host prolific oilfields elsewhere in the world.

=== Geology of Shark Bay ===
Playford discovered the stromatolites at Hamelin Pool in July 1954 when he and Daryl Johnstone were working in the Shark Bay area. The work in Shark Bay culminated in a comprehensive publication in 2013 that showcases the geology of this World Heritage Area. It includes details of living stromatolites, quaternary coastal geology and evidence of past mega-tsunamis. It also covers the cultural heritage of the area, including Aboriginal history and details of the wreck of the Zuytdorp in 1712.

=== Geology of Rottnest ===
Playford had a long history working on Rottnest Island, off the coast of Perth. He found freshwater on the island which, until that time, was being delivered from the mainland, and named many landmarks on the island including Wadjemup Hill (from the Aboriginal name for the hill), Pearse Lakes (after an island superintendent), Lake Vincent (after Henry Vincent, another superintendent of the island), and Fairbridge Bluff in Salmon Bay (after his University of Western Australia lecturer and mentor Rhodes Fairbridge). Playford wrote about the island's geology, illustrating dramatic changes in sea level (of up to 2.5 metres or 8 feet 2 inches) over the last 6000 years. In addition, he also located fossil coral reefs 120,000 years old 3 metres (9.8 ft) above sea level, which indicate the ocean was warmer then than it is today.

== Maritime History ==
At Tamala Station in 1954, elderly stockman Tom Pepper told Playford how he had found the remains of an old sailing ship and showed him coins and other objects he had picked up at the wreck site. Playford set off alone one weekend in a vehicle to bush bash and locate the site 64 kilometres (40 mi) from his geological camp based on verbal direction from Tom Pepper. The coins were dated 1711 and provided the vital clue for Playford to finally identify the wreck as being the Dutch ship Zuytdorp. Both Tom Pepper and Phillip Playford were named joint discoverers of the wreck in 1994 by the Government of Western Australia. The Zuytdorp Cliffs are a defining feature of the Western Australian coastline and the name was proposed by Playford arising from the discovery of the name of this major wreck site.

Playford wrote a book on the Zuytdorp entitled 'Carpet of Silver; the wreck of the Zuytdorp'. This book, published in 1996 by UWA Publishing, won a Western Australian Premier's Book Awards in 1997, and was reprinted in 1998 and 2006.

He also wrote 'Voyage of Discovery to Terra Australia by Willem de Vlamingh in 1696–97' (published by the Western Australian Museum in 1998 and reprinted in 1999) and 'The Life and Times of Dirk Hartog' with co-authors Robert Cribb, Greetje Bouma and Cor Boer.

== Aboriginal art and culture ==
While working on the Devonian limestones, Playford spent a lot of time talking to Aboriginal Elders and was able to determine the mythological significance of the paintings, and to map the tribal territories, publishing the results in 1960. This was the first detailed tribal distribution map to be produced for the West Kimberley.

In these papers he illustrated and discussed the remarkable cave art from the West Kimberley. The rock art on the West Kimberley had been very little studied and the sites he described had not been published previously.

Playford also made tape recordings of song cycles recounting the journeys of the great culture heroes of the dreamtime, and collecting the Aboriginal names and associated mythology of hundreds of features through the limestone ranges. These tape recordings and collections have been lodged in the Western Australian Museum and the Australian Institute of Aboriginal and Torres Strait Islander Studies in Canberra.

Many of the Aboriginal names have been recorded on the new series of geological maps that accompany Playford's publication on Devonian Reef complexes. In 1964 Playford joined an expedition run by the Department of Aboriginal Affairs that succeeded in locating many Aboriginal peoples living traditional lives in the Great Sandy and Gibson Deserts without having seen Europeans previously. Some elected to go to missions but others remained to return "some moons later" and then elected to move to missions within 12 months. Some of Playford's photographs from this expedition are held by the Western Australian Museum.

== Honours and awards ==
Year	Award
1959	Fulbright scholarship (to Stanford University)
1990	Gibb Maitland Medalist of the geological society of Australia
1991	Special Commendation Award, American Association of Petroleum Geologists (the first non-American recipient)
1993	Fellow, Australian Academy of Technological science and Engineering
1998	Member of the Order of Australia (AM) for contributions to geology and the history of early Dutch exploration and shipwrecks in Australia
1995	Lewis G Weeks Gold Medal, Australian Petroleum Exploration Association
2001	Medal of the Royal Society of Western Australia
