= Concordia (1696 ship) =

18th-century Dutch merchant ship

History

Netherlands
- Name: Concordia
- Owner: Dutch East India Company, Delft
- Builder: Dutch East India Company, Delfshaven
- Launched: 1696
- Fate: Lost at sea, 1708

General characteristics
- Tons burthen: 900 tons
- Length: 145 ft (44 m)
- Complement: 200–225 people

The Concordia was a Dutch sailing ship of the Dutch East India Company (Dutch: Vereenigde Oostindische Compagnie, commonly abbreviated to VOC) that left Batavia on 15 January 1708 with two other vessels, Zuiderburg and Mercurius. Concordia had 130 people on board and was bound for the Cape of Good Hope and then the Netherlands. She was last sighted by Mercurius in open seas to the south of the Sunda Strait on 5 February 1708, in bad weather.

== History ==
Built in 1696, Concordia was a large ship for her day, being approximately 900 tons. On 15 January 1708, under the command of Joris Vis, the Concordia set out from Batavia on a return trip to the Netherlands with two other VOC ships; Zuiderberg and Mercurius. Of the 130 passengers and crew on board, there were several women returning home and some Balinese being deported from the Dutch East Indies to the Cape of Good Hope, due to bad conduct.

Only the Mercurius reached the Cape of Good Hope. The Captain of Mercurius reported that Concordia and Zuiderburg had last been sighted together in open seas to the south of Sunda Strait on 5 February 1708, in bad weather. On 22 February, the crew of Mercurius found floating debris. They saw several goods in the water, some firewood, a chest of tea, a Chintz piece of cotton, a carpenters boor, white candles, and the staves for barrels. The Concordia was officially listed as being lost somewhere near Mauritius in 1708.

One known passenger aboard the Concordia was Mr Constantijn van Baerle, a VOC official.

== Leeds Mercury hoax ==
In 1832, a covert English expedition to inland Australia commanded by a Lieutenant Nixon reportedly discovered a group of white Dutch people (300 people) living in a desert oasis believed to be Palm Valley in the Northern Territory. The existence was first reported in February 1834 in the English newspaper Leeds Mercury. There were other articles in a Dutch scientific journal, and the Perth Gazette of 1837.

The newspaper story claimed that Nixon had spoken to the settlers in a broken form of old Dutch, and the leader or chief of the group was a descendant of an officer whose name was "van Baerle". The party remained with the group for eight days.

Nixon stated:

... their fathers were compelled by famine, after the loss of their great vessel, to travel towards the rising sun, carrying with them as much of the stores as they could, during which many died; and by the wise advice of their ten sisters they crossed a ridge of land, and meeting with a rivulet on the other side, followed its course and were led to the spot they now inhabit, where they have continued ever since.

Despite extensive research, no trace or direct evidence of the settlers has ever been found. Historians now believe the original 1834 Leeds Mercury story was a hoax.

== See also ==
- Zuytdorp shipwreck
