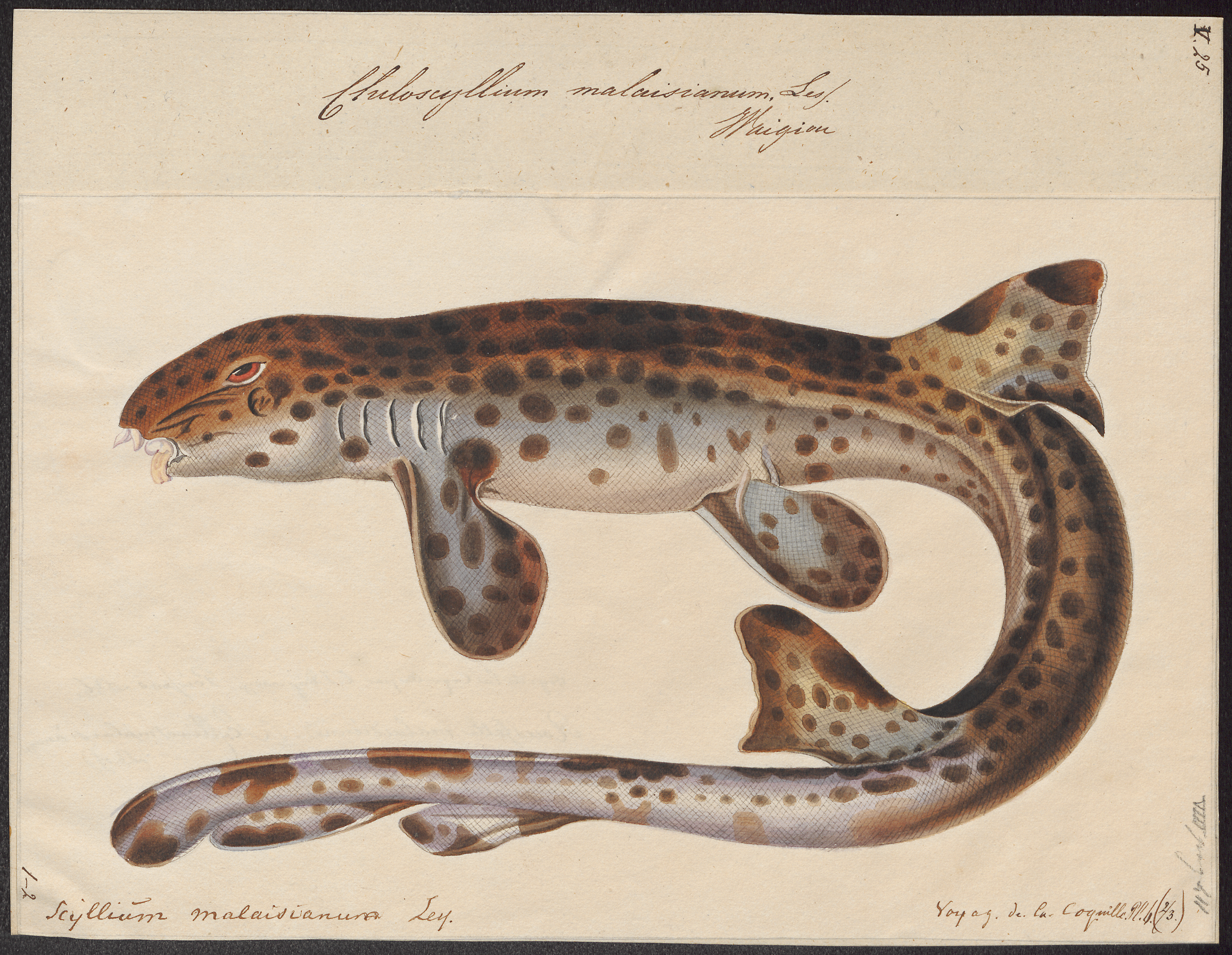

Conservation status
- Near Threatened (IUCN 3.1)

Scientific classification
- Kingdom: Animalia
- Phylum: Chordata
- Class: Chondrichthyes
- Subclass: Elasmobranchii
- Division: Selachii
- Order: Orectolobiformes
- Family: Hemiscylliidae
- Genus: Hemiscyllium
- Species: H. freycineti

Binomial name
- Hemiscyllium freycineti (Quoy & Gaimard, 1824)
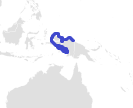
- Range of the Indonesian speckled carpetshark (note: It is only found in the far western part of the blue)

= Indonesian speckled carpetshark =

Species of shark

The Indonesian speckled carpetshark, Hemiscyllium freycineti, is a species of bamboo shark in the family Hemiscylliidae. It is found in the shallow ocean around the Raja Ampat Islands in West Papua, Indonesia, but was formerly believed to be more widespread. This was due to confusion with H. michaeli, a species described from eastern Papua New Guinea in 2010. Compared to that species, the spots on H. freycineti are smaller, more rounded or slightly elongated in shape (versus relatively large, edged and more leopard-like in H. michaeli), and tend to darken at regular intervals forming 8-9 vertical bars on the body and tail. Furthermore, the large black spot behind the pectoral fin is more clearly defined in H. michaeli than in H. freycineti. Confusingly, some books with illustrations and photos labelled as H. freycineti actually show H. michaeli.

H. freycineti reaches a length is up to 46 centimetres (18 in). It is nocturnal, hiding in reef crevices during the day.

== Etymology ==
The shark is named in honor of French navigator Louis de Freycinet (1779-1841), who collected the type specimen.

== See also ==
- List of sharks
- Carpet shark
