= Gareth Morse =

Welsh-Australian landscape painter

- Born: David Gareth Morse; 21 May 1932; Llwynypia, Rhondda, Wales
- Died: 31 July 2023 (aged 91); North Coogee, Western Australia, Australia
- Education: National Diploma in Design, West of England College of Art, 1949-1953; Art Teachers Diploma, University of Bristol, 1956; Advanced Diploma of Education, University of Bristol, 1972; Master of Education, University of Bristol, 1974
- Known for: Landscape Painting and Drawing
- Spouse: Margaret (née Lees)

Gareth Morse (21 May 1932 - 31 July 2023), was an influential Welsh-Australian landscape painter and draughtsman, art teacher, academic, art critic, reviewer and pianist.

== Early life ==
Morse was born in Llwynypia, Rhondda Cynon Taf, a coal-mining region of South Wales. His early life was spent in Ferndale, Rhondda Cynon Taf. Morse was the only child of Glynne (Glyndwr) Morse, a schoolteacher, and Eurwen Jenkins, a homemaker. Glynne Morse is credited with early theatrical tutelage of the actor Stanley Baker.

== Education ==
Morse studied fine art and calligraphy at the West of England College of Art, Bristol, and completed a number of tertiary qualifications in teacher education. He completed a Master of Education degree in 1974, under the supervision of Fred Inglis at the University of Bristol, entitled "Sign and meaning: a proposal for an affective semiology in art education".

== Career ==
Morse began a teaching career in 1956. In 1971 he became Head of Department of Art and Design, Henbury School, Henbury, Bristol, England. Morse emigrated with his family to Perth, Western Australia in 1975. From 1975 to 1982 he lectured in art education at Mount Lawley College of Advanced Education. From 1982 to 1987 he was Foundation Head of Department, Art and Design, Western Australian College of Advanced Education (WACAE). The WACAE was established on 1 January 1982 following the amalgamation of Claremont Teacher's College, Churchlands College of Advanced Education, Mount Lawley Teacher's College and Nedlands College of Advanced Education. He continued as co-ordinator of Post-graduate studies from 1987 to 1989, before taking early retirement in 1990. WACAE was granted university status from 1 January 1991 and changed its name to Edith Cowan University.

Between 1978 and 1983, Morse wrote as an art critic for The Australian newspaper, and from 1978 to 1981 contributed art reviews to ABC Radio Kaleidoscope, an arts program. He wrote numerous exhibition reviews for Art & Australia and Studio International.

== Artistic Practice ==
Morse was already an experienced artist who had been working as both an artist and teacher for nearly twenty years when he arrived in Australia in 1975. Key influences in his work include the mining landscapes of the Rhondda, drawing him immediately to the Western Australian Goldfields, where he made many field trips to Kalgoorlie and Coolgardie townships, as well as remote and abandoned tenements in these areas. Over time, his journeys expanded to include solo voyages to areas as diverse as Cervantes and the Pinnacles, Dampier, Karratha and Tom Price in the Pilbara, Darwin, Katherine Gorge, Kakadu and Kununurra, the Bungle Bungle Ranges, Ord River and Birdsville, Thursday Island, Tiwi Islands and Cape York.

His works are held in a number of public and private collections in Australia and overseas.

== Duyfken Notebook ==
Morses's Drawings of the progress of building the Duyfken 1606 replica 1997 : maritime precinct, Fremantle, was purchased by the Friends of the University of Western Australia Library in 2006. It is held in the Special Collections holdings of the Reid Library.

== Interviews ==
During the 1980s, Morse conducted a series of interviews at Mount Lawley College of Advanced Education, with the artists Sydney Nolan, Russell Drysdale and Charles Blackman. A series of interviews with Morse himself can be found at his personal website, covering a range of his paintings, philosophical concerns and biographical details.

== Exhibitions ==
Morse was given many solo and group exhibitions in Bristol and Western Australia, including a major retrospective in 1997 at the Lawrence Wilson Art Gallery, University of Western Australia, Perth. His final one-man exhibition, "Here Now, Gone Tomorrow" was held at the Gallows Gallery, 21 May - 18 June 2006.

Right up until shortly before his death at the age of 91, he continued to paint and draw regularly, remaining a highly productive artist during the final two years of his life at Aegis Shoreline, residential aged care in North Coogee, Western Australia.

== Personal life ==
Morse was married to the psychologist Margaret Morse and had four children: Kate Morse, a notable archaeologist; Alex, a General Practitioner; and twins Peter and Daniel. He had 9 grandchildren and 1 step-grandchild.

== Publications ==
- Morse, G. (1979). George Haynes at Gallery 52, Perth. Art & Australia, 16.1978/79([1979?]), 362–363.
- Morse, G. (1983). Mac Betts and David Jones, Two West Australian Artists. Studio International / Ed. G.s. Whittet, 196.1983, 1002, 48–49.
- Morse, G. (1986). Mac Betts. Art & Australia, 23.1985/86([1986?]), 383–386.
