= Duperreya =

Scientific classification
- Kingdom: Plantae
- Clade: Tracheophytes
- Clade: Angiosperms
- Clade: Eudicots
- Clade: Asterids
- Order: Solanales
- Family: Convolvulaceae
- Genus: Duperreya; Gaudich.

Genus of plants

Duperreya is a genus of flowering plants belonging to the family Convolvulaceae.

Its native range is Australia.

Its genus name of Duperreya is in honour of Louis Isidore Duperrey (1786–1865), French explorer, and it was published in Voy. Uranie Vol.452 in 1829.

Known species:

- Duperreya commixta (Staples) Staples
- Duperreya halfordii R.W.Johnson
- Duperreya sericea Gaudich.
