= Louis-Isidore Duperrey =

French naval officer and explorer

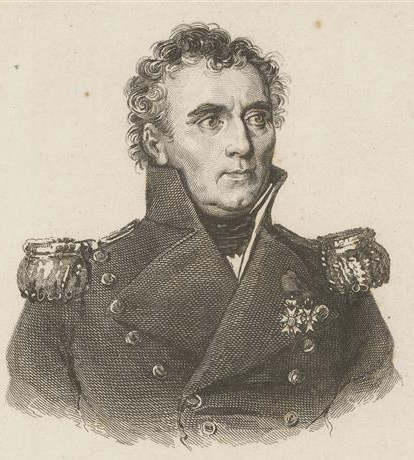
- Born: 21 October 1786; Paris, France
- Died: 25 August 1865 (aged 78); Paris, France
- Occupations: Naval officer, explorer

Louis-Isidore Duperrey (French pronunciation: [lwi izidɔʁ dypɛʁɛ]; 21 October 1786 – 25 August 1865) was a French naval officer and explorer.

== Biography ==
=== Early life ===
Louis-Isidore Duperrey was born in 1786.

=== Career ===
He joined the navy in 1802, and served as marine hydrologist to Louis Claude de Saulces de Freycinet aboard the Uranie (1817–1820). He commanded La Coquille on its circumnavigation of the earth (1822–1825) with Jules Dumont d'Urville as second. René-Primevère Lesson also travelled on La Coquille as a naval doctor and naturalist. On the return to France in March 1825, Lesson and Dumont brought back to France an imposing collection of animals and plants collected on the Falkland Islands, on the coasts of Chile and Peru, in the archipelagos of the Pacific and New Zealand, New Guinea and Australia.

During the voyage the ship spend two weeks in the Bay of Islands in the north of New Zealand in 1824 and visited for ten days on l'île d'Oualan, now Kosrae, contemporary Federated States of Micronesia, that same year. On the return voyage to France the ship sailed through the Ellice Islands (now known as Tuvalu).

He was the first to put together on a map the whole Gilbert Islands archipelago, which are now part of Kiribati (with the name given to it by Admiral Krusenstern).

Duperrey was elected a Foreign Honorary Member of the American Academy of Arts and Sciences in 1861. Duperrey was elected to the Académie des Sciences as a general member in 1842, elected vice president in 1849 and became its president in 1850.

=== Death ===
He died in 1865.

== Legacy ==
The Australian eastern three-lined skink, Bassiana duperreyi (Gray, 1838), was named in his honour.

Two plant genera have been named in his honour: Duperrea (in 1924) and Duperreya from Australia (in 1829).

== See also ==
- European and American voyages of scientific exploration
