= Kate Morse =

Australian archaeologist (1958–2023)

Katheryn Helen Morse
- Born: October 15, 1958; Australia
- Died: July 13, 2023 (aged 64); Fremantle, Western Australia
- Occupation: Archaeologist
- Known for: Pioneering Pleistocene coastal archaeology in Western Australia; Excavations at Mandu Mandu Creek rockshelter, Ganga Maya cave, and Kariyarra Rockshelter
- Notable work: Mandu Mandu Creek discoveries Research on Pilbara region prehistory
- Title: Director of Research, University of Western Australia
- Children: 3

Katheryn Helen Morse (15 October 1958 – 13 July 2023) was an Australian archaeologist who pioneered research on Pleistocene coastal archaeology in Western Australia.

== Background ==
In the late 1980s Morse excavated a small limestone rockshelter known as Mandu Mandu at North-West Cape Western Australia as part of her post-graduate studies. Here she found perforated shell beads dating to c.30,000 which are the oldest examples of human adornment in Australia. It also demonstrated the antiquity of the exploitation of marine resources by Aboriginal people.

In 2014 she excavated at Ganga Maya cave and Kariyarra Rockshelter, south of Port Hedland, where she demonstrated continuous occupation of the northeast inland Pilbara, from 45,000 years ago to recent times.

Morse was Director of Research at the University of Western Australia, curator at the Western Australian Museum and lecturer at the Centre for Archaeology at the University of Western Australia. Her fieldwork and research covered much of Western Australia, including the Ningaloo/Cape Range area, Perth metropolitan area, the Gascoyne, Murchison, Pilbara and Kimberley regions.

Morse undertook consulting work as director of Eureka Archaeological Consulting. She was an advocate for high standards of research and meaningful outcomes from consulting practice as co-director of Big Island Research.

== Personal life and death ==
Morse was one of four children of Margaret Morse (a psychologist) and Gareth Morse (an artist) and she was married with three children. She died in Fremantle, Western Australia on 13 July 2023, at the age of 64.

== Principal publications ==
- Emerging from the abyss: archaeology in the Pilbara region of Western Australia 2009
- An archaeological survey of midden sites near the Zuytdorp 'Wreck, Western Australia'. Bulletin of the Australian Institute for Maritime Archaeology, 12.1 1988. 37–40.
- Coastal shell middens, Cape Range peninsula, Western Australia : an appraisal of the Holocene evidence, Tempus, 1996; v. 4 p. 9-25
- Mandu Mandu Creek rockshelter: Pleistocene human coastal occupation of North West Cape, Western Australia, Archaeology in Oceania, v.23, no.3, Oct 1988, p. 81-88 (ISSN: 0003-8121
- Who can see the sea Prehistoric Aboriginal occupation of the Cape Range peninsula, Records of the Western Australian Museum (1993) Supplement no. 45, p. 227-248
- New radiocarbon dates from North West Cape, Western Australia: a preliminary report, in Sahul in review; pleistocene archaeology in Australia, New Guinea and island Melanesia, edited by M.A. Smith, M. Spriggs and B. Fankhauser Canberra; Dept. of Prehistory, Research School of Pacific Studies, Australian National University, 1993; p. 155-163
- Middle Head: a prehistoric Aboriginal shell midden on the southwestern Australian coast, Australian Archaeology, no.15, Dec 1982, p.1-7 (ISSN: 0312–2417)
