= Louis de Freycinet =

French Navy officer (1779–1841)

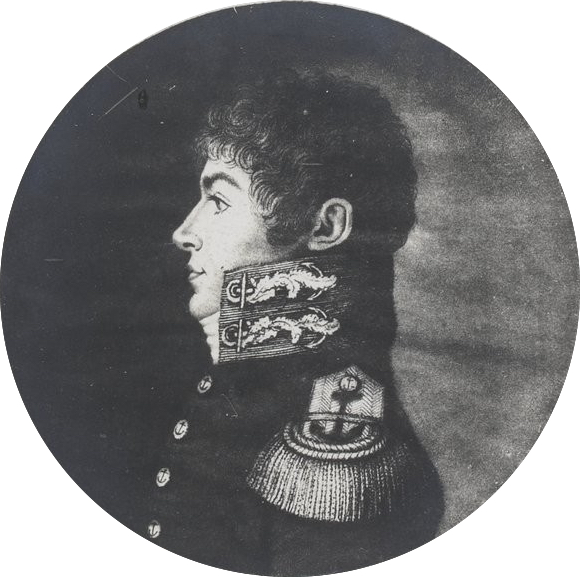
- Born: Louis Claude de Saulces de Freycinet; 7 August 1779; Montélimar, Drôme, France
- Died: 18 August 1841 (aged 62) Château de Freycinet, Saulce-sur-Rhône, Drôme, France
- Allegiance: France
- Branch: French Navy
- Rank: Captain
- Known for: Circumnavigating the Earth, drawing the first map to show the full Australian coastline
- Spouse: Rose de Freycinet

Louis Claude de Saulces de Freycinet (French pronunciation: [lwi d(ə) fʁɛsinɛ]; 7 August 1779 – 18 August 1841) was a French Navy officer. Following the 1800–1803 Baudin expedition to Australia, he published in 1811 the first map to show the full Australian coastline. He later circumnavigated the Earth, and was elected to the French Academy of Sciences in 1825.

== Biography ==
He was born at Montélimar, Drôme. Louis Claude de Saulces de Freycinet was his full name; many called him Louis de Freycinet. His mother was Élisabeth-Antoinette-Catherine Armand. He had three brothers, Louis Henri de Saulces de Freycinet (a fellow naval officer after whom Louis named Henri Freycinet Harbour, who was also part of the Baudin expedition), André Charles de Saulces de Freycinet and the youngest, Frédéric Casimir de Saulces de Freycinet (father of Charles de Freycinet). Louis Claude was the second oldest.

In 1793 amid the French Revolution he joined the French Navy as a midshipman, and took part in several engagements against the British. In 1800, he was appointed to an exploration expedition to southern and south-western coasts of Australia under Nicolas Baudin, on Naturaliste and Géographe. Freycinet's brother, Louis Henri de Freycinet, was also part of the expedition.

Between September 1802 and August 1803, Freycinet captained the schooner Casuarina, surveying the Australian coastline. He then transferred to Naturaliste, and returned to France in 1804. Matthew Flinders was being held captive by the French on Mauritius, thus many of his discoveries were revisited and unintendedly claimed by François Péron, and new names were given by this expedition. In 1824, it was remedied in the second edition of Voyage découvertes aux terres australes. In the end, Freycinet managed to have his map of the Australian coastline published in 1811, three years before Flinders published his. An inlet on the coast of Western Australia is called Freycinet Estuary. Cape Freycinet between Cape Leeuwin and Cape Naturaliste and the Freycinet Peninsula with Freycinet National Park in Tasmania also bear the explorer's name.

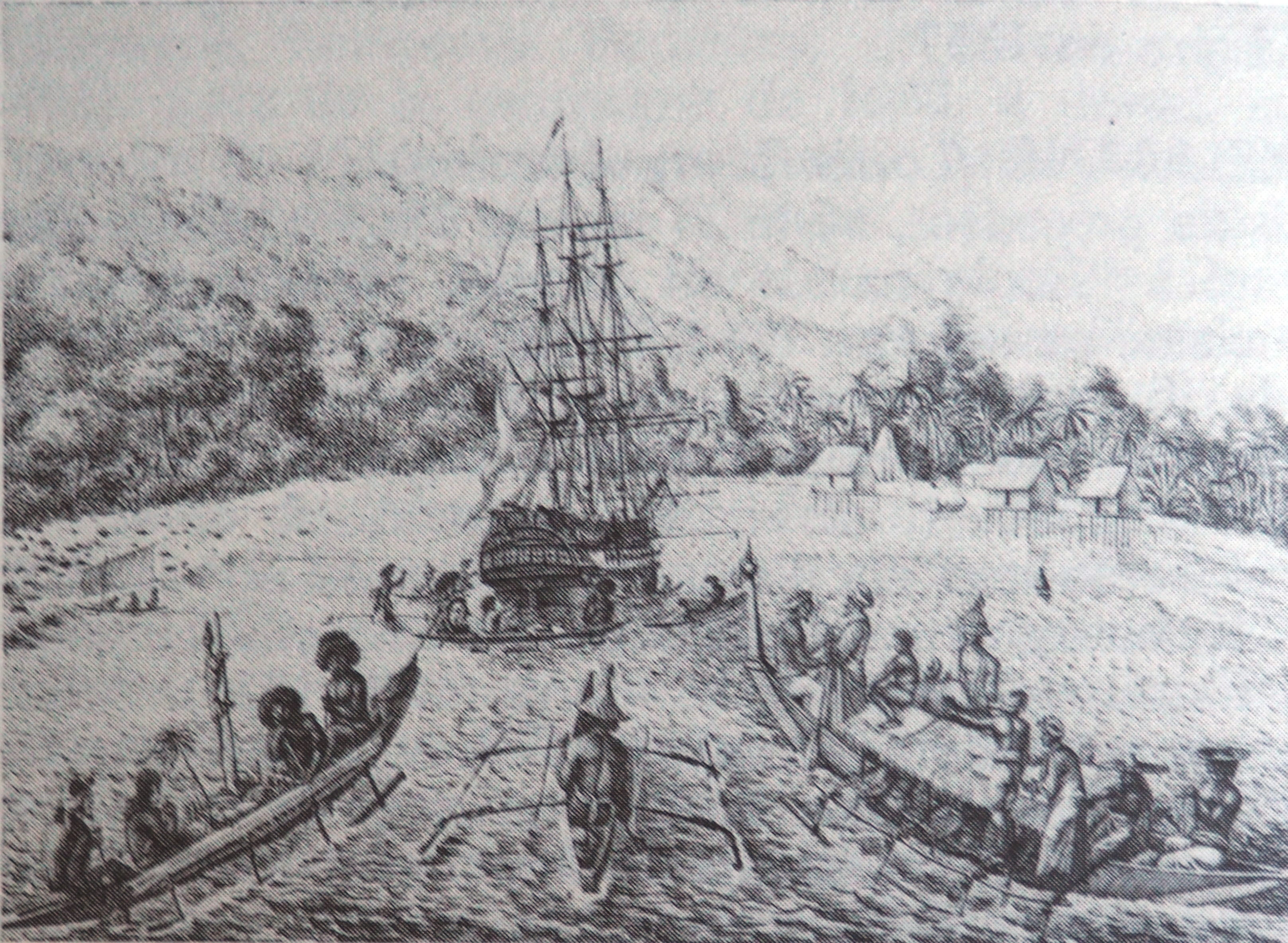
Depiction of Freycinet's exploration to the Southern territories.

In 1805, he returned to Paris, and was entrusted by the government with the work of preparing the maps and plans of the expedition. He also completed the narrative, and the whole work appeared under the title of Voyage de découvertes aux terres australes (Paris, 1807–1816).

The plant genus Freycinetia (Pandanaceae) was named in his honour, as was the Hawaiian native tree/shrub Santalum freycinetianum.

=== Circumnavigation on Uranie ===
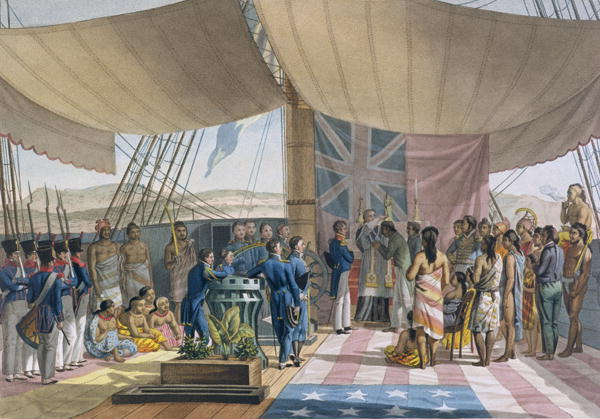
Baptism of Hawaiians on the Uranie in 1819

In 1817, he was given command of the French corvette Uranie (1811), especially reconfigured to a new exploration voyage. Uranie carried the marine hydrologist Louis Isidore Duperrey, the naturalists Jean Quoy and Joseph Gaimard, the artist Jacques Arago, and his junior draughtsman Adrien Taunay the Younger.

Uranie sailed to Rio de Janeiro by December 1817, taking a series of pendulum measurements gather information in the fields of geography, ethnology, astronomy, terrestrial magnetism, meteorology, and for collecting specimens in natural history. Freycinet also managed to sneak his wife Rose de Freycinet aboard.

For three years, Freycinet cruised about the Pacific, visiting Australia twice (1818 and 1819), New Guinea (1818–1819), the Mariana Islands (early 1819), Hawaiian Islands (August 1819) other Pacific islands, South America, and other places. Notwithstanding the loss of Uranie on the Falkland Islands during the return voyage, Freycinet returned to France with fine collections in all departments of natural history, and with voluminous notes and drawings of the countries visited.

The results of this voyage were published under Freycinet's supervision, with the title of Voyage autour du monde fait par ordre du Roi sur les corvettes de S. M. l'Uranie et la Physicienne, pendant les années 1817, 1818, 1819 et 1820, in 13 quarto volumes and 4 folio volumes of plates and maps.

Freycinet was admitted into the French Academy of Sciences in 1825, and was one of the founders of the Paris Geographical Society. He died at the family's Château de Freycinet near Saulce-sur-Rhône, Drôme in 1841.

== Journals of the 1817–1820 voyage ==
- Vol. 1 Part 1: Book I France to Brazil. pub.1827.
- Vol. 1 Part 2: Book II Brazil to Timor. pub.1828.
- Vol. 2 Part 1: Book III Timor to the Marianas. pub.1829.
- Vol. 2 Part 2: Book IV Guam to Hawaii; Book V Hawaii to Port Jackson 1819. pub.1829.
- Vol. 2 Part 3: Book V Hawaii to Port Jackson; Book VI Port Jackson to France 1820. pub.1839.
- Zoology. pub.1824.
- Zoology Plates. pub.1824.
- Botany. pub.1826.
- Botany Plates. pub.1826.
- Navigation and Hydrography, Part 1. pub.1826.
- Navigation and Hydrography, Part 2. pub.1826.
- Pendulum Observations. pub.1826.
- Terrestrial Magnetism. pub.1842.
- Meteorology. pub.1844.

== See also ==
- European and American voyages of scientific exploration
- Freycinet Map of 1811

== Taxa named in his honour ==
- The Indonesian speckled carpetshark, Hemiscyllium freycineti is named after him.
- The flowering plant, Freycinetia (Pandanaceae)
- Periophthalmodon freycineti, the pug-headed mudskipper, is a species of mudskipper from the subfamily Oxudercinae of the gobiiform family Oxudercidae. It distribution extends from the Philippines through eastern Indonesia, Papua New Guinea and northern Queensland.

== Notes and references ==
Notes

Bibliography

- Edward Duyker François Péron: An Impetuous Life: Naturalist and Voyager, Miegunyah/MUP, Melb., 2006, ISBN 978-0-522-85260-8,
- Fornasiero, Jean; Monteath, Peter and West-Sooby, John. Encountering Terra Australis: the Australian voyages of Nicholas Baudin and Matthew Flinders, Kent Town, South Australia, Wakefield Press, 2004. ISBN 1-86254-625-8
- Frank Horner, The French Reconnaissance: Baudin in Australia 1801–1803, Melbourne University Press, Melbourne, 1987 ISBN 0-522-84339-5.
- Marchant, Leslie R. French Napoleonic Placenames of the South West Coast, Greenwood, WA. R.I.C. Publications, 2004. ISBN 1-74126-094-9
- Hordern House, Captain Louis de Freycinet and his Voyages to the Terres Australes, Hordern House, Sydney, 2011 ISBN 978-1-875567-62-1
- Federico Motta, Sous des cieux inconnus - Le voyage autour du monde de Rose de Freycinet (1817-1820) - Le journal annoté, l’analyse de Rose en femme de son époque, et les questions historiques du voyage de l’Uranie, July 2026.

 DOI: 10.5281/zenodo.18865062; 10.6084/m9.figshare.31496554.[1]

- Rose de Freycinet (patronymic Pinon) and Federico Motta (curator), Una viaggiatrice clandestina a bordo dell’Uranie negli anni 1817–20, Verona, June 2017. Italian translation of Rose’s original journal, fully annotated and accompanied by new documents.
- Taillemite, Étienne (2002). Dictionnaire des Marins français. Tallandier. ISBN 2-84734-008-4. OCLC 606770323.
- Rare Freycinet map. Ile Decrès, or Kangaroo Island, 1803, held by the Royal Geographical Society of South Australia
