= Freycinet Map of 1811 =

First map of Australia published with full outline

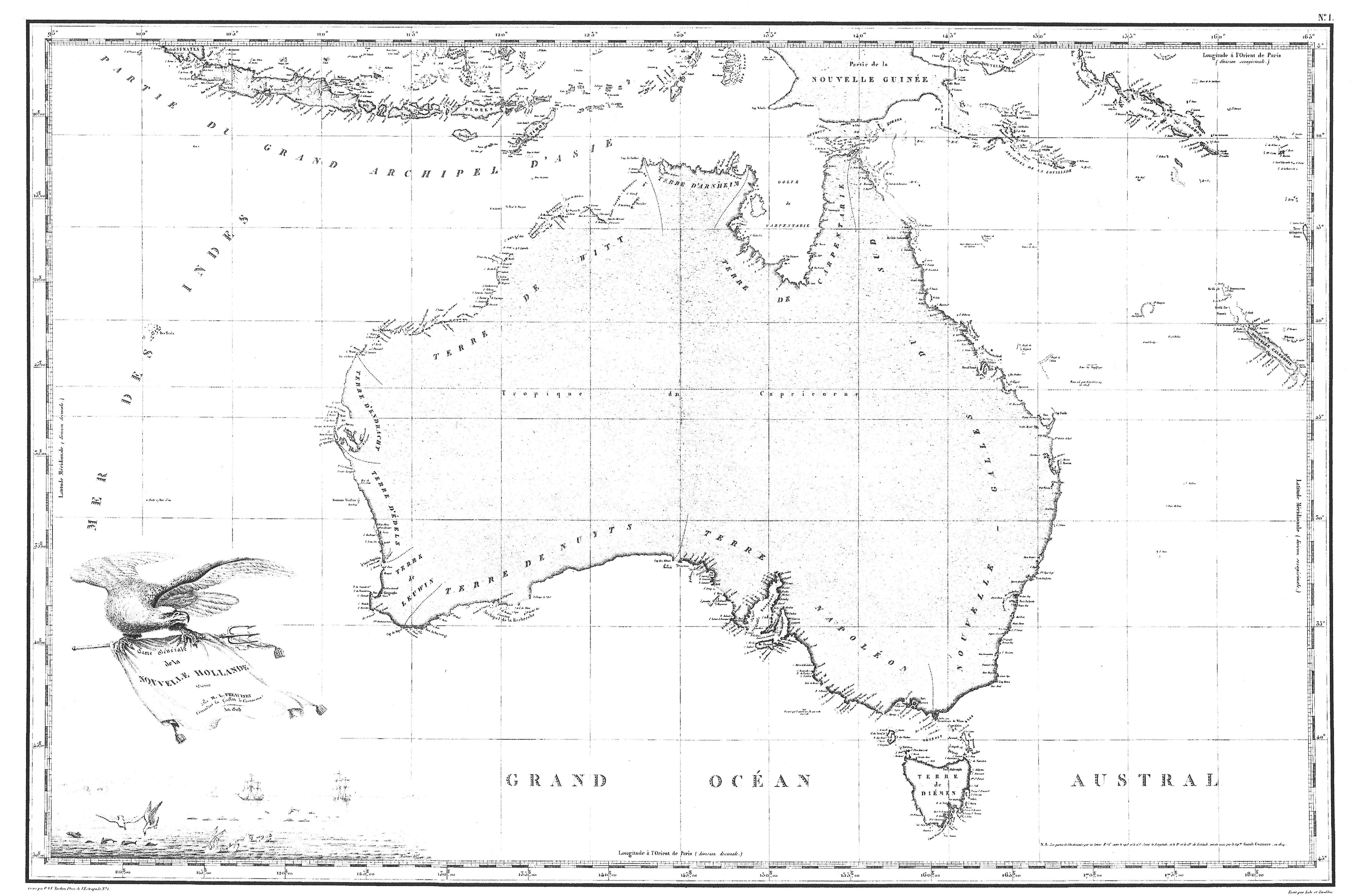
The Freycinet Map of 1811 – The first full map of Australia to be published

The Freycinet Map of 1811 is the first map of Australia to be published which shows the full outline of Australia. It was drawn by Louis de Freycinet and was an outcome of the Baudin expedition to Australia. It preceded the publication of Matthew Flinders' map of Australia, Terra Australis or Australia, by three years.

== Background ==
The Baudin expedition to Australia was intended to be a voyage of discovery that would further scientific knowledge and perhaps eclipse the achievements of Captain James Cook. Napoléon Bonaparte, as First Consul, formally approved the expedition ‘to the coasts of New Holland’, after receiving a delegation of Nicolas Baudin and eminent members of the Institut National des Sciences et Arts on 25 March 1800. The explicit purpose of the voyage was to be ‘observation and research relating to Geography and Natural History.’

Among those joining the Baudin expedition's ships, the Géographe and Naturaliste, were Sub-Lieutenants Louis-Claude (Louis) de Saulses de Freycinet and his older brother Henri-Louis (Henri). Louis did not initially sail as a ‘geographer’. Both were eventually promoted to Lieutenant, and Louis was later given command of the schooner Casuarina, purchased in Sydney to enable improved inshore surveying. Another member of the expedition was the 25-year-old Assistant Zoologist François Péron.

The expedition departed Le Havre on 19 October 1800. Because of delays in receiving his instructions and problems encountered in Isle de France (now Mauritius) they did not reach Cape Leeuwin on the south west corner of the continent until early winter 1801. Upon rounding Cape Naturaliste, they entered Geographe Bay. During their exploration here they lost a longboat and a sailor, Assistant Helmsman Timothée Vasse. They then sailed north, the ships became separated and did not meet again until they reached Timor. The expedition was severely affected by dysentery and fever, but sailed from Timor on 13 November 1801, across the Great Australian Bight and reached Tasmania on 13 January 1802. The whole length of Tasmania's east coast was charted and there were extensive interactions with the Tasmanians. The expedition then began surveying the south coast of Australia but then Captain Jacques Felix Emmanuel Hamelin in the Naturaliste decided to make for Port Jackson as he was running short of food and water, and in need of anchors. Meanwhile, Baudin in the Géographe continued westward, meeting with Matthew Flinders at Encounter Bay. Flinders informed Baudin of his discovery of Kangaroo Island, St. Vincent's and Spencer's Gulfs. Baudin sailed on to the Nuyts Archipelago, the point reached by 't Gulden Zeepaert in 1627 before heading for Port Jackson as well.

Before resuming the voyage Baudin decided to purchase a 30-tonne schooner, which he named Casuarina, and to send Hamelin back to France in the Naturaliste. As the voyage had progressed Louis de Freycinet, now a Lieutenant, had shown his talents as an officer and a hydrographer and so was given command of the Casuarina. The expedition conducted further charting of Bass Strait before sailing west, following the west coast northward, and after another visit to Timor, undertook further exploration along the north coast of Australia. Plagued by contrary winds, ill health and because 'the quadrupeds and emus were very sick', it was decided on 7 July 1803 to return to France. On the return voyage Baudin died in Mauritius, on 16 September, of tuberculosis. Finally, on 24 March 1804, the expedition reached Lorient roadstead off France.

== Publication ==
Publication of the volumes giving the official account of the expedition, Voyage de Découvertes aux Terres Australes, and the associated atlases, was authorised by Napoléon on 4 August 1806. François Péron, along with naturalist Lesueur, was given responsibility, with Louis de Freycinet, who had already been working on the charts, to undertake the cartography. But a range of difficulties and delays arose, and it took ten years for the project to be completed, resulting in some confusion in the order of publication. The first volume, Historique, was published in 1807, but the second volume, also Historique, was not published until 1816, although volume 3, Navigation et Geographie, had already been published in 1815. This was partly due to the death of François Péron in 1810, from tuberculosis, when de Freycinet took over responsibility for the final volumes, and partly strained government finances.

A number of controversies arose with the publication of the volumes and maps. Included in these was the almost complete elimination of any reference to Baudin and, it seems at Péron's behest, the application of French names to many geographic features and coasts already explored and named by other navigators, particularly Flinders. These were corrected in subsequent editions.

The Freycinet map was published in the second part of Atlas Historique in 1811. It is referred to as a 'full' map of Australia, as the term ‘complete’ map is not strictly correct in relation to both the Freycinet and the Flinders maps. Both have numerous small gaps where inlets were missed or it was too dangerous to undertake close surveying.

== 200th anniversary ==
To mark the bicentenary of the publication of the Freycinet Map, on 16 June 2011, Henry de Freycinet, the last male descendant of the de Freycinets, presented Her Excellency Ms Quentin Bryce, Governor-General of Australia, with a signed copy of the Freycinet Map at Government House in Canberra.

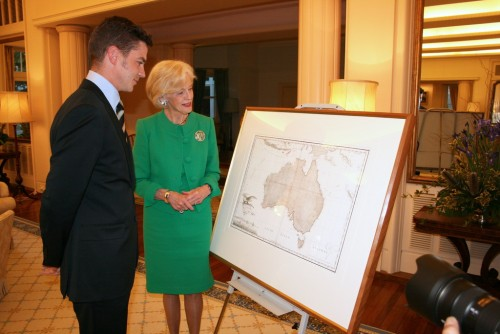
Henry de Freycinet presenting a copy of the 1811 Freycinet Map to Governor-General Ms Quentin Bryce.

The Australia on the Map Division of the Australasian Hydrographic Society, in collaboration with the National Library of Australia and the French Embassy held an international symposium on the Freycinet Map on 19 June 2011 at the National Library of Australia.

== See also ==
- Australia on the Map
