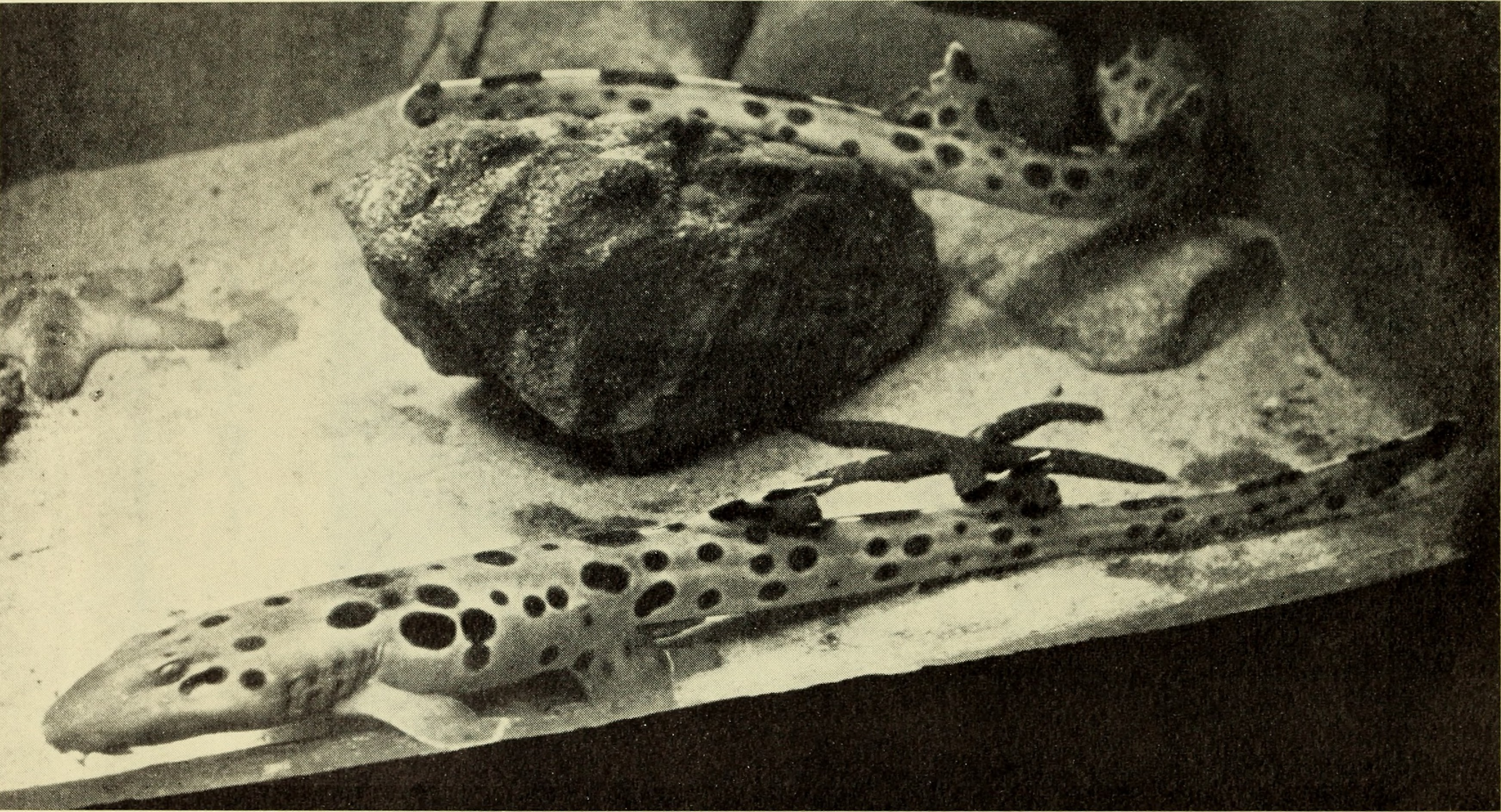

Conservation status
- Vulnerable (IUCN 3.1)

Scientific classification
- Kingdom: Animalia
- Phylum: Chordata
- Class: Chondrichthyes
- Subclass: Elasmobranchii
- Division: Selachii
- Order: Orectolobiformes
- Family: Hemiscylliidae
- Genus: Hemiscyllium
- Species: H. hallstromi

Binomial name
- Hemiscyllium hallstromi Whitley, 1967
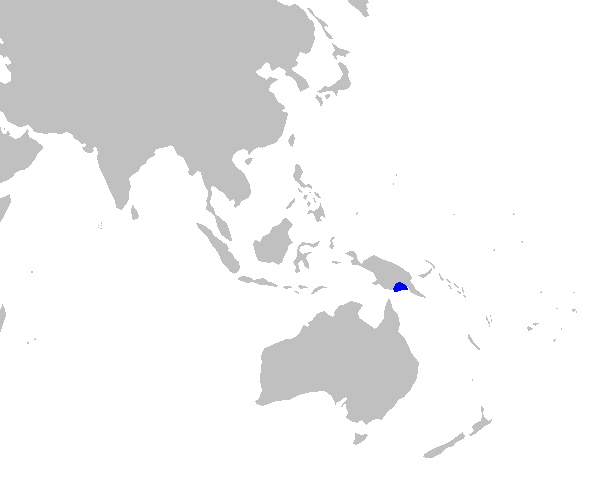
- Range of Papuan epaulette shark (in blue)

= Papuan epaulette shark =

Species of shark

The Papuan epaulette shark, Hemiscyllium hallstromi, is a bamboo shark in the family Hemiscylliidae found around southern Papua New Guinea, between latitudes 7° S and 10° S, and longitude 144° E and 146° E. Its length is up to 75 cm.

Reproduction is oviparous.

== Etymology ==
The shark is named in honor of philanthropist Edward Hallstrom (1886–1970), a trustee and chairman of Taronga Zoological Park, where holotype and paratype were kept alive in captivity.

== See also ==
- List of sharks
- Carpet shark
