= Australasian Hydrographic Society =

The Australasian Hydrographic Society (AHS) is a professional hydrographic organisation covering Australasia, the South West Pacific and South East Asia. It brings together practitioners and representatives of industry in the region, particularly those involved in maritime and port services, undersea exploration, offshore oil and gas projects and associated infrastructure. Because these sectors are closely linked to rapid growth in economic development and trade in the region, it is expected hydrography will have an increasingly important role in the future development of the economy.

== History ==
The Australasian Hydrographic Society was originally part of The Hydrographic Society (THS), founded in 1972. It was one of five autonomous national branches, Australasia, the Benelux countries, Denmark, the UK and the USA. By 2000 it apparent that this structure was no longer workable and a decision was made to form national bodies, which would constitute a new international organisation, the International Federation of Hydrographic Societies (IFHS). Subsequently the Australasian Hydrographic Society was incorporated on 5 August 2002 and is now a registered a not-for-profit Public Company with the Australian Securities and Investments Commission.

== Role of hydrography and related sciences in the region ==
Hydrography is essential for many economic, recreational and tourism activities. In particular the development of offshore projects in the oil and gas industries, particularly off the north west coast of Western Australia and coal export facilities in Queensland have required a considerable increase in the provision of accurate and up to date hydrographic information. The attendant increase in trade, for example, has made improved navigation through sensitive area, such as the Great Barrier Reef critical. Hydrography also plays an important role in national security, border protection and humanitarian support.

The Australasian Hydrographic Society endeavours to represent all interests in these domains. The Australasian Hydrographic Society consequently "aims to serve anyone with an interest in the science (and art)" of hydrography, "the influence of which makes it the great common denominator for maritime nations".

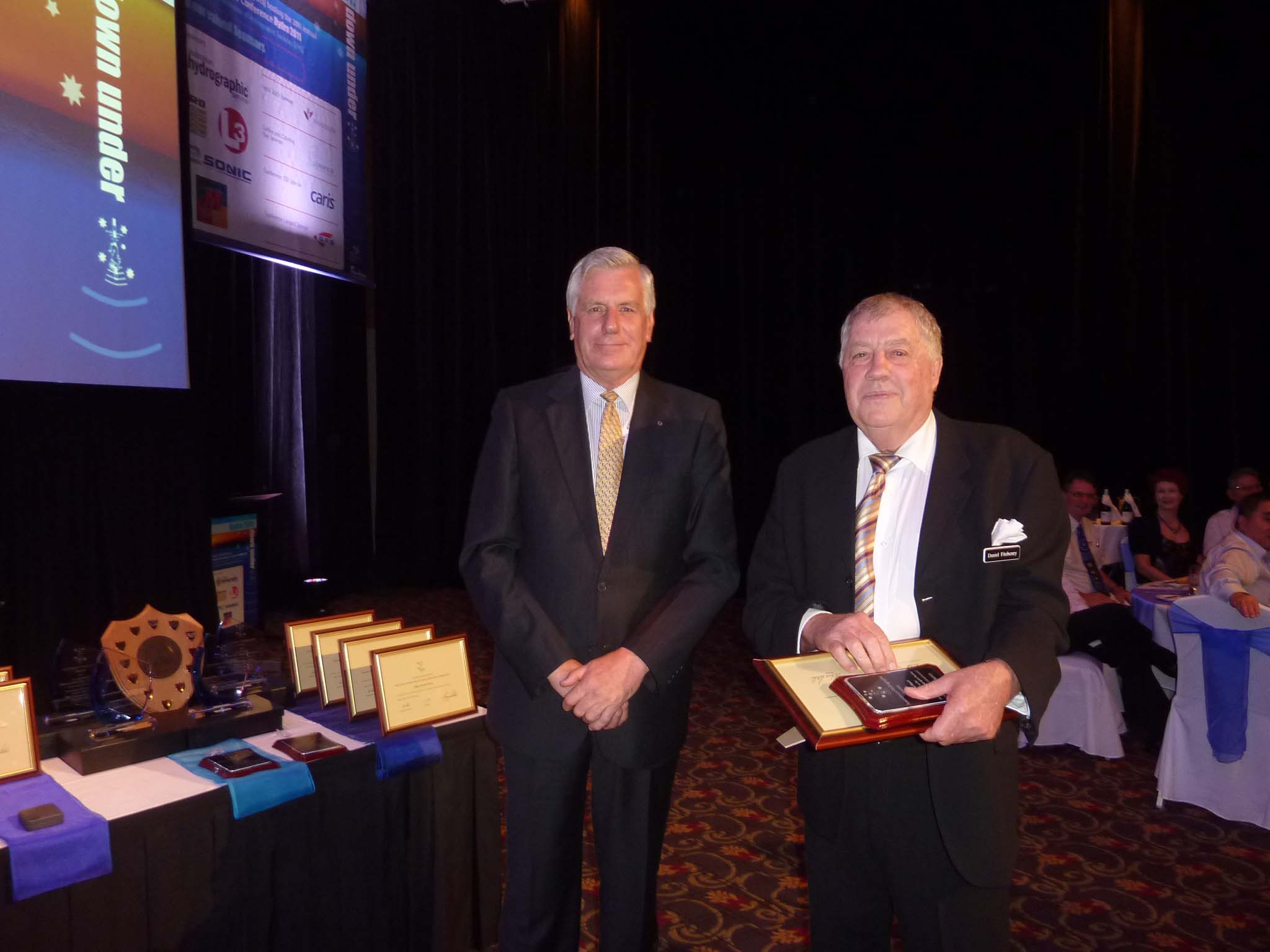
AHS Patron, Vice Admiral Chris Ritchie AO RANR (left) presenting award at Hydro 2011

== Structure ==
The Australasian Hydrographic Society has four regions, the East Australia Region, the West Australia Region, the New Zealand Region, AOTM Australia on the Map Division and a South West Pacific Region. Each region is geographically based, except for the Australia on the Map Division which has a transnational focus on hydrographic history and heritage.

The Australasian Hydrographic Society has a Council made up of elected officer-bearers (President, Secretary, Treasurer) and representatives from each of the regions. The Council is responsible for the governance of the organisation.

The Patron of the Australasian Hydrographic Society is Vice Admiral Chris Ritchie AO RANR. The Australasian Hydrographic Society is a member of the International Federation of Hydrographic Societies.

== Activities ==
The Australasian Hydrographic Society regions engage in a wide range of activities. These include technical meetings, seminars, symposia, preparation of reports, social gatherings, educational initiatives and awareness-raising. The Society is also actively engaged in the development of international standards and protocols in hydrography, hydrographic surveying and technical specifications.

The Australasian Hydrographic Society has an online presence through its website. The New Zealand Region and Australia on the Map Division also maintain separate websites.

The New Zealand Region previously issued a newsletter, The Boustrophedon, and the Australia on the Map Division currently produces an electronic newsletter, Map Matters.

Divisions may from time to time produce specialist publications. The Australia on the Map Division, for example, recently published the proceedings of a symposium, The Freycinet Map of 1811.

=== Hydro conferences ===
The Australasian Hydrographic Society actively participates in the International Federation of Hydrographic Societies and has hosted that organisation's annual international conference on three occasions, Hydro 2003 (Christchurch, New Zealand), Hydro 2007 (Cairns, Australia) and Hydro 2011 (Fremantle, Australia).

== Awards ==
The Australasian Hydrographic Society provides an annual Education Award for students studying in a range of hydrographic and hydrography related disciplines.

The Australasian Hydrographic Society Awards, awarded annually, recognises the merit, contribution and achievement made by individuals, groups and corporate bodies in a range of categories.
