= Baudin =

Baudin may refer to:

== People ==
- Auguste Baudin (1800–1877), French admiral and colonial governor
- Charles Baudin (1792–1854), French admiral
- Fernand Baudin (1918–2005), Belgian graphic designer
- Eugène Baudin (1853–1918), French ceramist and politician
- François-André Baudin (1774–1842), French admiral
- Jacques Baudin (1939–2018), Senegalese politician
- Jean-Baptiste Baudin (1811–1851), French physician, Assembly deputy, and martyr
- Nicolas Baudin (1754–1803), French explorer
  - Baudin expedition to Australia, 1800–1803
- Pierre Charles Louis Baudin (1748–1799), French politician who became president of the National Convention
- Robert Baudin (1918–1983), American counterfeiter
- Tobias Baudin (1974–), Swedish politician

== Geography ==
=== Antarctica ===
- Baudin Peaks, Graham Land, Antarctica

=== Australia ===
==== South Australia ====
- Baudin Beach, South Australia, a locality
- Baudin Conservation Park, a protected area
- Baudin Rocks, an island
  - Baudin Rocks Conservation Park, a protected area
- Electoral district of Baudin, South Australia, in existence from 1977 to 1993
- Nicolas Baudin Island, an island
  - Nicolas Baudin Island Conservation Park, a protected area
- Hundred of Baudin, a proposed cadastral division on Kangaroo Island

==== Western Australia ====
- Baudin, Western Australia, a locality
- Baudin Island (Kimberley coast), off Western Australia
- Baudin Island (Shark Bay), off Western Australia

== Ships ==
- Amiral Baudin-class ironclad
  - French ironclad Amiral Baudin, in service 1883–1910
