= French ironclad Formidable =

Ironclad warship of the French Navy

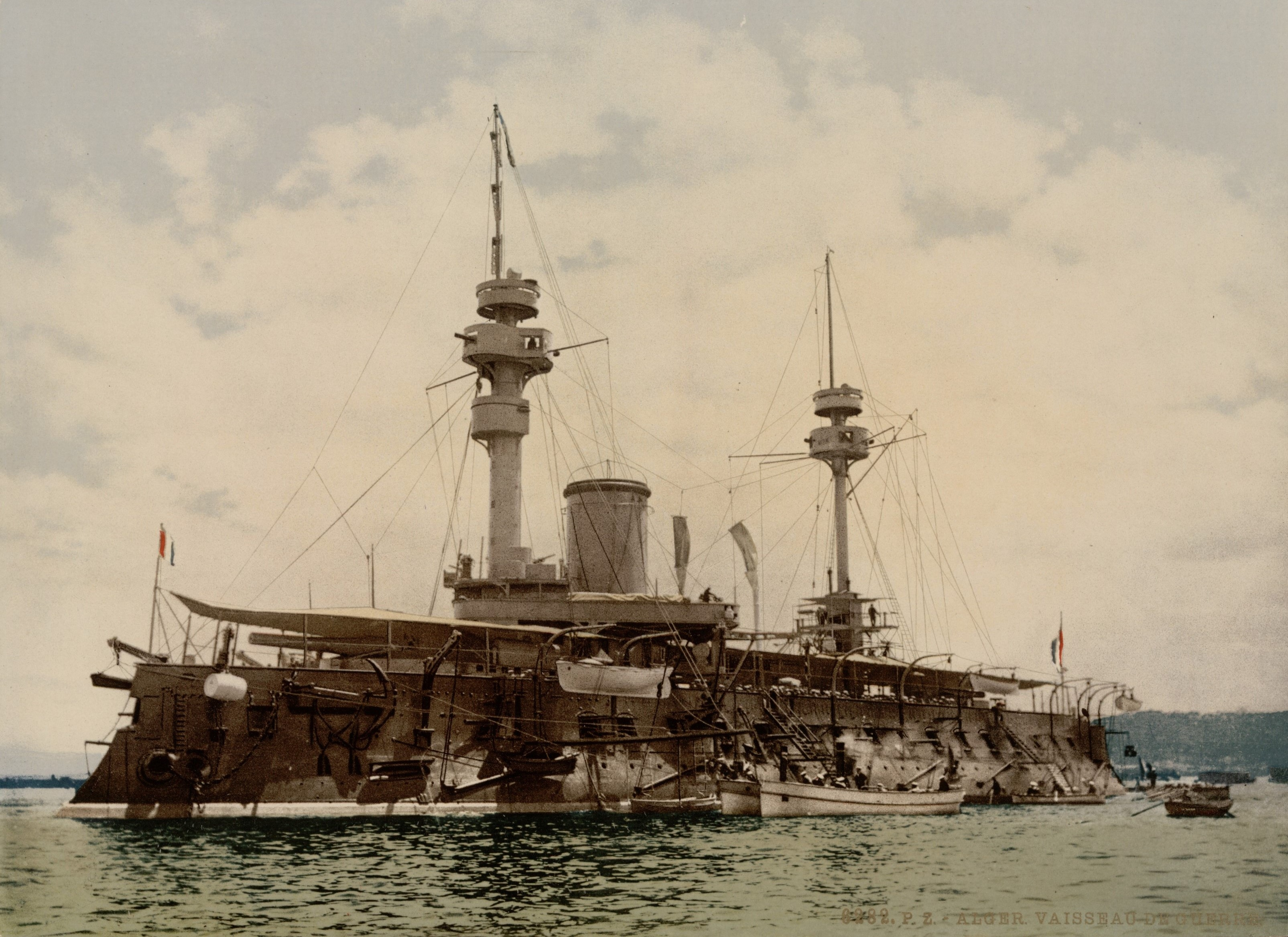
- Formidable in Algiers in 1899

History

France
- Name: Formidable
- Builder: Arsenal de Lorient, France
- Laid down: 10 January 1879
- Launched: 16 April 1885
- Commissioned: 25 May 1889
- Stricken: 9 February 1909
- Fate: Broken up

General characteristics
- Class & type: Amiral Baudin-class ironclad
- Displacement: 11,720 long tons (11,910 t)
- Length: 101.4 m (332 ft 8 in) lwl
- Beam: 21.34 m (70 ft)
- Draft: 8.46 m (27 ft 9 in)
- Installed power: 12 × fire-tube boilers; 9,700 indicated horsepower (7,200 kW)
- Propulsion: 2 × compound steam engines; 2 × screw propellers
- Speed: 16 knots (30 km/h; 18 mph)
- Complement: 625
- Armament: 3 × 370 mm (14.6 in) Modèle 1875 guns; 4 × 163 mm (6.4 in) Modèle 1884 guns; 8 × 138 mm (5.4 in) Modèle 1881 guns; 1 × 47 mm (1.9 in) gun; 12 × 47 mm Hotchkiss revolver cannon; 18 × 37 mm (1.5 in) Hotchkiss revolver cannon; 6 × 450 mm torpedo tubes
- Armor: Belt: 356 to 559 mm (14 to 22 in); Conning tower: 79 to 119 mm (3.1 to 4.7 in); Barbettes: 406 mm (16 in)

Formidable was an ironclad barbette ship built for the French Navy between her keel laying in late 1879 and her completion in early 1889. She was the second and final member of the Amiral Baudin class. The ships of the class was designed in response to Italian naval expansion, and carried a main battery of three 370 mm (14.6 in) guns all mounted in open barbettes on the centerline. The armament was chosen after public pressure to compete with the very large guns mounted on the latest Italian ironclads.

Formidable spent most of her career in the Mediterranean Fleet, where she conducted fleet training exercises each year. In 1891, she was involved in tests with tethered observation balloons. Her career passed fairly uneventfully, though she caused a grounding accident that involved two other vessels in 1895. She was modernized between 1897 and 1898, which included removing her center main battery gun and barbette and installing a battery of light quick-firing guns in its place. After returning to service, she was transferred to the Northern Squadron, based in the English Channel, where the routine of peacetime training maneuvers continued. Withdrawn from active duty in 1903, she briefly saw service in 1904 but was again removed from use thereafter and was stricken from the naval register in 1909 before being broken up thereafter.

== Design ==
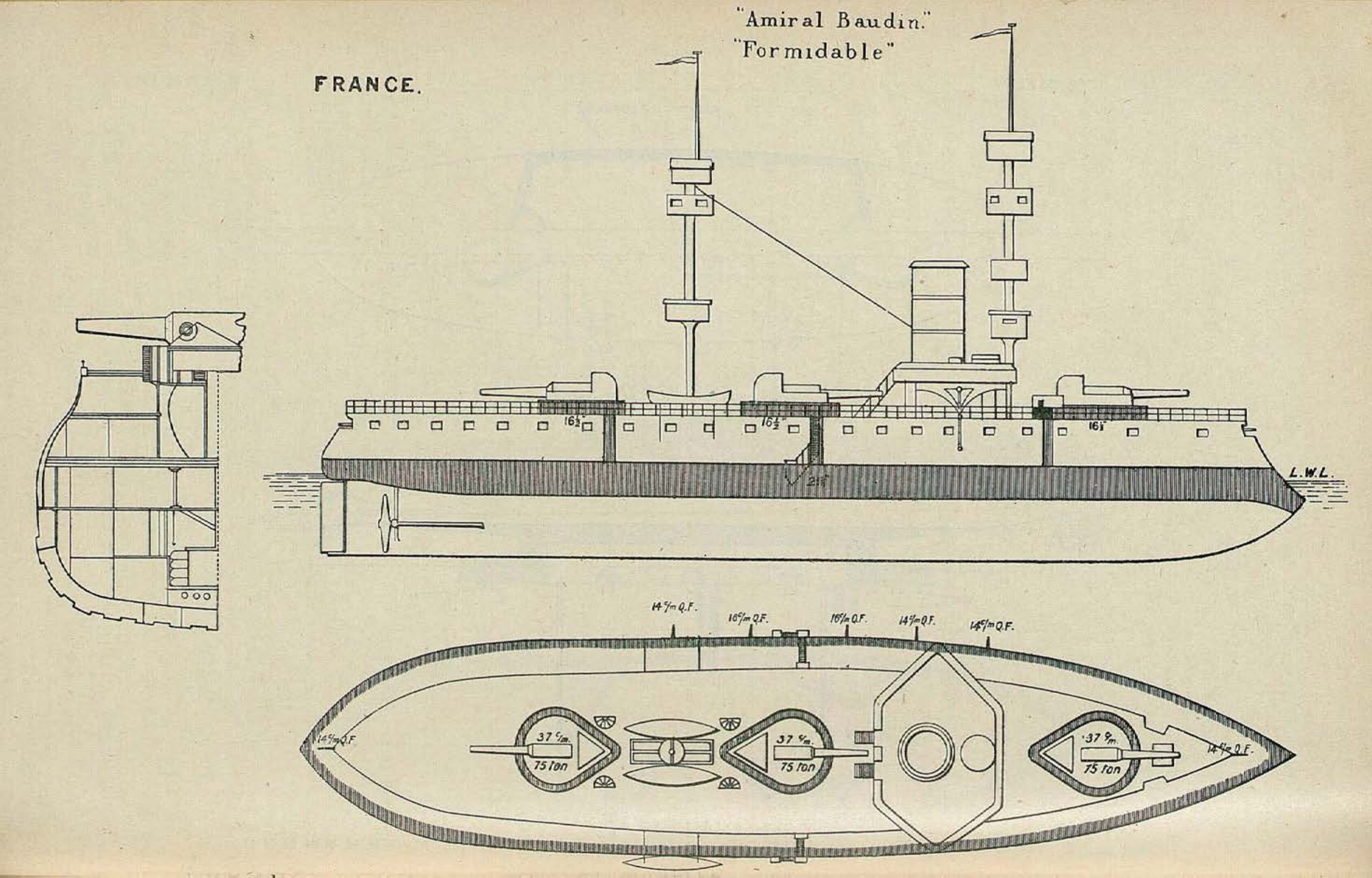
Right elevation, deck plan, and hull section of the Amiral Baudin class

Amiral Baudin and Formidable were designed in the late 1870s as part of a naval construction program that began under the post-Franco-Prussian War fleet plan of 1872. By 1877, the Italian fleet under Benedetto Brin had begun building powerful new ironclads of the Duilio and Italia classes, which demanded a French response, beginning with the ironclad Amiral Duperré of 1877. The Italian vessels carried significantly larger guns than Amiral Duperré, which prompted calls from the Chamber of Deputies to increase the caliber of future ship armament. This resulted in the development of the 370 mm (14.6 in) gun used in the Amiral Baudin class, which was in most other respects, similar to Amiral Duperré.

Formidable was 101.4 m (332 ft 8 in) long at the waterline, with a beam of 21.34 m (70 ft) and a draft of 8.46 m (27 ft 9 in). She displaced 11,720 long tons (11,910 t). She was fitted with a pair of pole masts equipped with spotting tops for her main battery guns. The crew consisted of 625 officers and enlisted men. Her propulsion machinery consisted of two compound steam engines with steam provided by twelve coal-burning fire-tube boilers. Her engines were rated to produce 9,700 indicated horsepower (7,200 kW) for a top speed of 16 knots (30 km/h; 18 mph).

Her main armament consisted of three 370 mm (14.6 in), 28-caliber guns mounted in individual barbette mounts, one forward, one amidships, and one aft, all on the centerline. These guns were supported by a secondary battery of four 163 mm (6.4 in) and eight or ten 138 mm (5.4 in) guns, all carried in individual pivot mounts. For defense against torpedo boats, she carried one 47 mm (1.9 in) 3-pounder gun, twelve 47 mm 3-pounder Hotchkiss revolver cannon, and eighteen 37 mm (1.5 in) 1-pounder Hotchkiss revolvers, all in individual mounts. Her armament was rounded out with six 381 mm (15 in) torpedo tubes in above-water mounts.

The ship was protected with a combination of mild steel and compound armor; her belt was 356 to 559 mm (14 to 22 in) thick and extended for the entire length of the hull. The barbettes for the main battery were 406 mm (16 in) thick and the supporting tubes were also 406 mm. Her conning tower was 79 to 119 mm (3.1 to 4.7 in) thick.

== Service history ==
=== Construction – 1895 ===
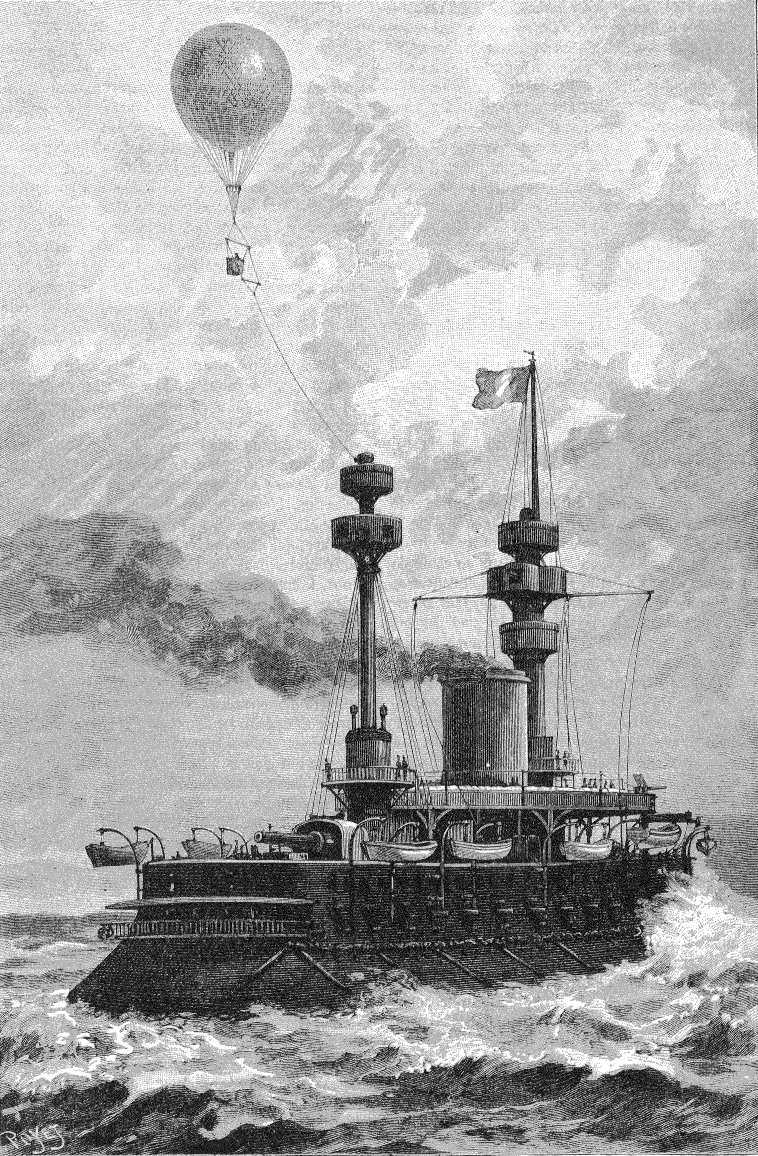
Formidable testing a captive balloon in 1890

Formidable was built at the Lorient shipyard, she was ordered on 13 December 1878, and her keel was laid down on 10 February 1879. She was launched on 16 April 1885 and was commissioned for sea trials on 29 December 1888. She left Lorient on 3 January 1889 for Toulon, where she carried out her trials, which were approved on 4 May. The ship was placed in full commission on 25 May, and she thereafter served in the 1st Division, Mediterranean Squadron in 1889, along with her sister Amiral Baudin, and Amiral Duperré. She took part in the annual fleet maneuvers that year in company with her division-mates and six other ironclads, along with numerous smaller craft. Formidable served as part of the French force during the maneuvers, which lasted from 30 June to 6 July. During the 1890 fleet maneuvers, the ship served in the 1st Division of the 1st Squadron of the Mediterranean Fleet. At the time, the division also included the ironclads Courbet and Amiral Duperré. The ships concentrated off Oran, French Algeria on 22 June and then proceeded to Brest, France, arriving there on 2 July for combined operations with the ships of the Northern Squadron. The exercises began four days later and concluded on 25 July, after which Formidable and the rest of the Mediterranean Fleet returned to Toulon. That year, she took part in experiments with a tethered observation balloon for spotting purposes at sea.

During the fleet maneuvers of 1891, which began on 23 June, Formidable remained with the 1st Division, 1st Squadron along with Courbet and the ironclad Dévastation. The maneuvers lasted until 11 July. The ship remained in service with the Mediterranean Fleet in 1892, which by that time had been joined by the three Marceau-class ironclads. She participated in the 1893 maneuvers, again as part of the 1st Division in company with Courbet and the ironclad Redoutable. This year, Formidable served as the fleet flagship, hosting Vice Admiral Louis Vignes. The maneuvers included an initial period of exercises from 1 to 10 July and then larger-scale maneuvers from 17 to 28 July.

She remained in the 1st Squadron in 1895, by which time it had been reduced in size to Amiral Baudin, Formidable, the three Marceaus, Courbet, and Dévastation. On 13 November, while the fleet was entering Hyères, Formidable, leading the line, failed to turn in accordance with the instructions of the fleet commander, Vice Admiral Alfred Gervais. She turned too widely and ran aground on a shoal that had formed since the most recent hydrographic survey. The line of ships fell into disarray; the second ship, Marceau, managed to turn in time, but Amiral Baudin also ran aground and Courbet brushed the sea floor. Formidable was pulled free later that night and a subsequent inquiry absolved Gervais of responsibility for the accident. Despite the grounding, Formidable was not damaged in the accident.

=== 1896–1911 ===
Formidable after her refit

Formidable remained in active service with the Mediterranean Fleet in 1896. She was withdrawn from service the next year to be modernized, including the removal of her central main battery gun, which was replaced with a battery of four 163 mm guns in open single mounts. She also received new boilers, which allowed her to use mix oil and coal firing. Work on the ship was completed in 1898. She participated in the fleet maneuvers that year, which lasted from 5 to 25 July. By 1899, Formidable had become obsolescent as more modern pre-dreadnought battleships built in the mid-1890s had entered service. As a result, she was assigned to the less strategically significant Northern Squadron in the English Channel, along with Amiral Baudin, Amiral Duperré, Dévastation, Courbet, and Redoutable.

The next year, two of these new battleships—Carnot and Masséna—joined Formidable in the Northern Squadron, which at that time also included Amiral Baudin, Redoutable, and Amiral Duperré, though the latter two vessels were withdrawn from service to be modernized that year. In June and July that year, she participated in extensive joint maneuvers conducted with the Mediterranean Fleet. The Northern Squadron initially held its own maneuvers in Brest, which included a simulated blockade of the squadron in Brest, after which the squadron made mock attacks on the island of Belle Île and nearby Quiberon. In early July, the squadron met the Mediterranean Squadron off Lisbon, Portugal before the two units steamed north to Quiberon Bay and entered Brest on 9 July. Formidable and the rest of the Northern Squadron were tasked with conducting a mock attack on Cherbourg two days later. The maneuvers concluded with a naval review in Cherbourg on 19 July for President Émile Loubet.

The Northern Squadron remained unchanged for 1901, apart from the addition of the ironclad Hoche. During the fleet maneuvers that year, the Northern Squadron steamed south for joint maneuvers with the Mediterranean Fleet. The Northern Squadron ships formed part of the hostile force, and as it was entering the Mediterranean from the Atlantic, represented a German squadron attempting to meet its Italian allies. The exercises began on 3 July and concluded on 28 July. In August and September, the Northern Squadron conducted amphibious assault exercises. On 28 August, they escorted a group of troop ships from Brest to La Rochelle, which the ships bombarded, neutralized the coastal defenses, and put some 6,000 men ashore. The next year, the squadron was reorganized, leaving Formidable, Masséna, and Courbet in the unit that year, along with four coastal defense ships. During the 1902 fleet maneuvers, which began on 7 July, the Northern Squadron attempted to force a passage through the Strait of Gibraltar. Formidable served as the flagship of the squadron commander, Vice Admiral Charles-Félix-Edgard de Courthille. The squadron was unable to effect the passing unobserved by the Mediterranean Squadron's cruisers, but de Courthille was able to shake his pursuers long enough to prevent them from intercepting his force before the end of the exercises on 15 July. Further maneuvers with the combined fleet took place, including a simulated battle where Formidable and the other ships of the Northern Squadron represented the British Mediterranean Fleet; the exercises concluded on 5 August. Formidable was laid up out of service in 1903, but she returned to active service with the Northern Squadron the following year, though only briefly, as she was decommissioned after the battleships Carnot and Bouvet were transferred to the unit.

The ship was condemned on 6 November 1908 and struck from the naval register on 9 February 1909. She was sent to Landévennec, where she acted as a service ship for the vessels in reserve there through 1910. She was placed for sale on 20 July 1911, sold the same day, and subsequently broken up for scrap.
