= French ironclad Amiral Baudin =

Ironclad warship of the French Navy

- Amiral Baudinafter her reconstruction in the late 1890s

History

France
- Name: Amiral Baudin
- Namesake: Nicolas Baudin
- Builder: Brest
- Laid down: 1 January 1879
- Launched: 5 June 1883
- Commissioned: 21 January 1889
- Decommissioned: 15 May 1908
- Stricken: 6 May 1909
- Fate: Broken up, 1911

General characteristics
- Class & type: Amiral Baudin-class ironclad
- Displacement: 11,720 long tons (11,910 t)
- Length: 101.4 m (332 ft 8 in) lwl
- Beam: 21.34 m (70 ft)
- Draft: 8.46 m (27 ft 9 in)
- Installed power: 12 × fire-tube boilers; 8,400 indicated horsepower (6,300 kW)
- Propulsion: 2 × compound steam engines; 2 × screw propellers
- Speed: 15 knots (28 km/h; 17 mph)
- Complement: 625
- Armament: 3 × 370 mm (14.6 in) Modèle 1875 guns; 4 × 163 mm (6.4 in) Modèle 1884 guns; 8 × 138 mm (5.4 in) Modèle 1881 guns; 4 × 47 mm (1.9 in) guns; 1 × 47 mm Hotchkiss revolver cannon; 14 × 37 mm (1.5 in) Hotchkiss revolver cannon; 6 × 381 mm (15 in) torpedo tubes
- Armor: Belt: 356 to 559 mm (14 to 22 in); Conning tower: 79 to 119 mm (3.1 to 4.7 in); Barbettes: 406 mm (16 in)

General characteristics (1896–1898 refit)
- Armament: 2 × 370 mm Modèle 1875 guns; 4 × 163 mm Modèle 1887 guns; 8 × 138 mm Modèle 1893 guns; 2 x 65 mm (2.6 in) guns; 20 x 47 mm guns; 6 x 37 mm guns; 6 × 37 mm Hotchkiss revolver cannon; 4 × 381 mm torpedo tubes

Amiral Baudin was an ironclad barbette ship of the French Navy built in the late 1870s and 1880s. She was the lead ship of the Amiral Baudin class, which included one other vessel, Formidable. The Amiral Baudin class was designed in response to Italian naval expansion, and carried a main battery of three 370 mm (14.6 in) guns all mounted in open barbettes on the centerline. The armament was chosen after public pressure to compete with the very large guns mounted on the latest Italian ironclads. Amiral Baudin was laid down in 1879 and was completed in 1888.

Amiral Baudin spent most of her career in the Mediterranean Fleet, where she conducted fleet training exercises each year. Her career passed fairly uneventfully, though she was involved in a grounding in 1895. She was modernized between 1896 and 1898, which included removing her center main battery gun and barbette and installing a battery of light quick-firing guns in its place. After returning to service, she was transferred to the Northern Squadron, based in the English Channel, where the routine of peacetime training maneuvers continued. Withdrawn from active duty in 1903, she saw no further service and was stricken from the naval register in 1909. Converted into a barracks ship that year, she served in that capacity just through 1910 before being sold to ship breakers in early 1911.

== Design ==
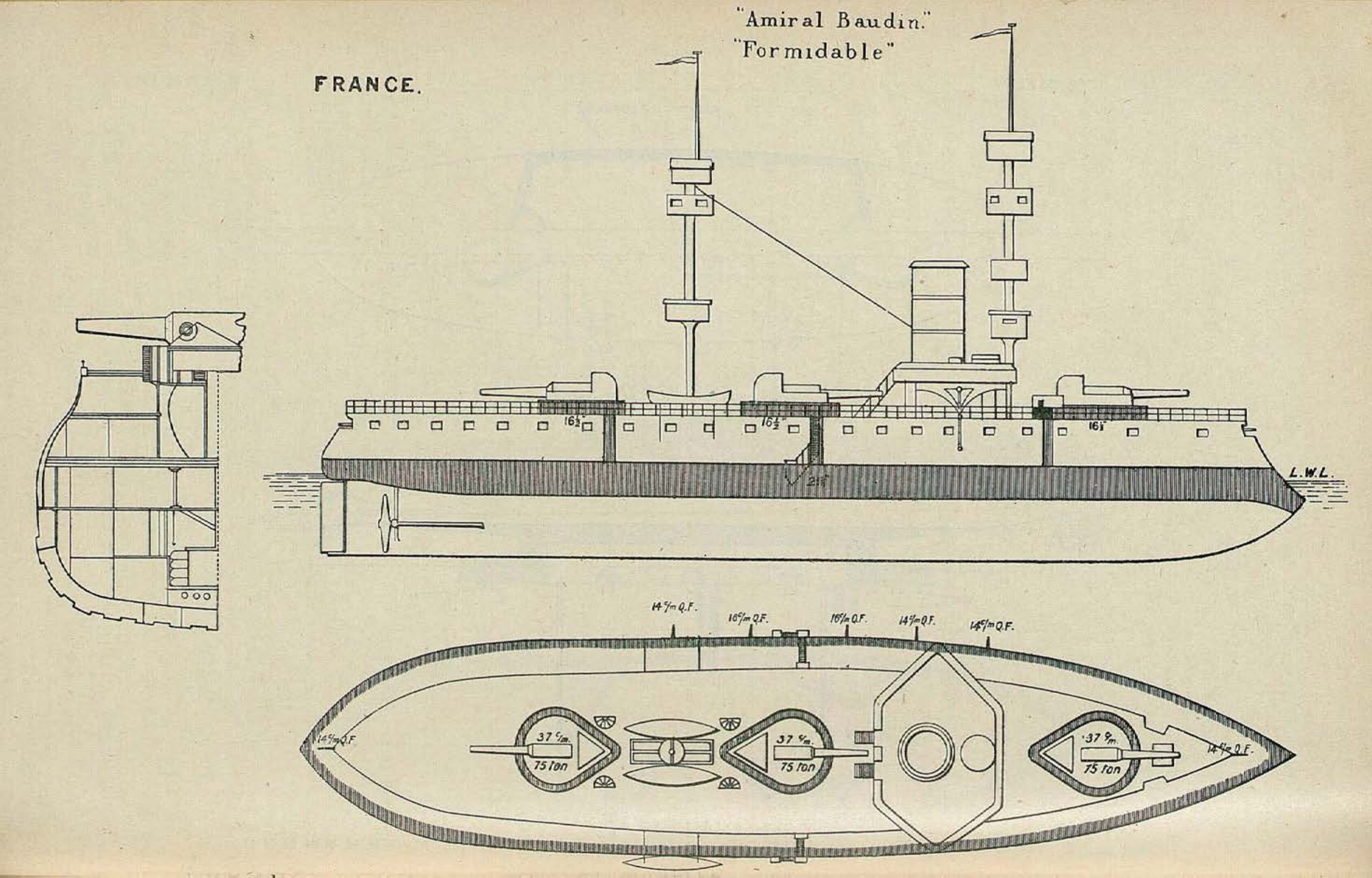
Right elevation, deck plan, and hull section of the Amiral Baudin class

Amiral Baudin and Formidable were designed in the late 1870s as part of a naval construction program that began under the post-Franco-Prussian War fleet plan of 1872. By 1877, the Italian fleet under Benedetto Brin had begun building powerful new ironclads of the Duilio and Italia classes, which demanded a French response, beginning with the ironclad Amiral Duperré of 1877. The Italian vessels carried significantly larger guns than Amiral Duperré, which prompted calls from the Chamber of Deputies to increase the caliber of future ship armament. This resulted in the development of the 370 mm (14.6 in) gun used in the Amiral Baudin class, which was in most other respects, similar to Amiral Duperré.

Amiral Baudin was 101.4 m (332 ft 8 in) long at the waterline, with a beam of 21.34 m (70 ft) and a draft of 8.46 m (27 ft 9 in). She displaced 11,720 long tons (11,910 t). She was fitted with a pair of pole masts equipped with spotting tops for her main battery guns. The crew consisted of 625 officers and enlisted men. Her propulsion machinery consisted of two compound steam engines with steam provided by twelve coal-burning fire-tube boilers. Her engines were rated to produce 8,400 indicated horsepower (6,300 kW) for a top speed of 15 knots (28 km/h; 17 mph).

Her main armament consisted of three 370 mm (14.6 in), 28-caliber guns mounted in individual barbette mounts, one forward, one amidships, and one aft, all on the centerline. These guns were supported by a secondary battery of four 163 mm (6.4 in) and eight or ten 138 mm (5.4 in) guns, all carried in individual pivot mounts. For defense against torpedo boats, she carried four 47 mm (1.9 in) 3-pounder guns, one 47 mm 3-pounder Hotchkiss revolver cannon, and fourteen 37 mm (1.5 in) 1-pounder Hotchkiss revolvers, all in individual mounts. Her armament was rounded out with six 381 mm (15 in) torpedo tubes in above-water mounts.

The ship was protected with a combination of mild steel and compound armor; her belt was 356 to 559 mm (14 to 22 in) thick and extended for the entire length of the hull. The barbettes for the main battery were 406 mm (16 in) thick and the supporting tubes were also 406 mm. Her conning tower was 79 to 119 mm (3.1 to 4.7 in) thick.

=== Modifications ===
The ship underwent a series of modifications through her career; the first of these took place in 1892, which saw her 138.6 mm guns converted to quick-firing models. In 1897, Amiral Baudin was modernized more extensively, including numerous changes to her armament. The central main battery gun was removed, along with its barbette, and a new, lightly armored battery for the 163 mm guns was erected in its place. These guns were removed from their hull sponsons and quick-firing M1887 versions were installed in the new battery. Quick-firing versions of the 138 mm guns were installed in place of the old guns, and her anti-torpedo boat defense was revised to two 65 mm (2.6 in) guns, twenty of the 47 mm guns, six 37 mm Hotchkiss guns, and six of the 37 mm Hotchkiss revolver cannon. Two of her torpedo tubes were also removed.

== Service history ==
=== Construction – 1895 ===
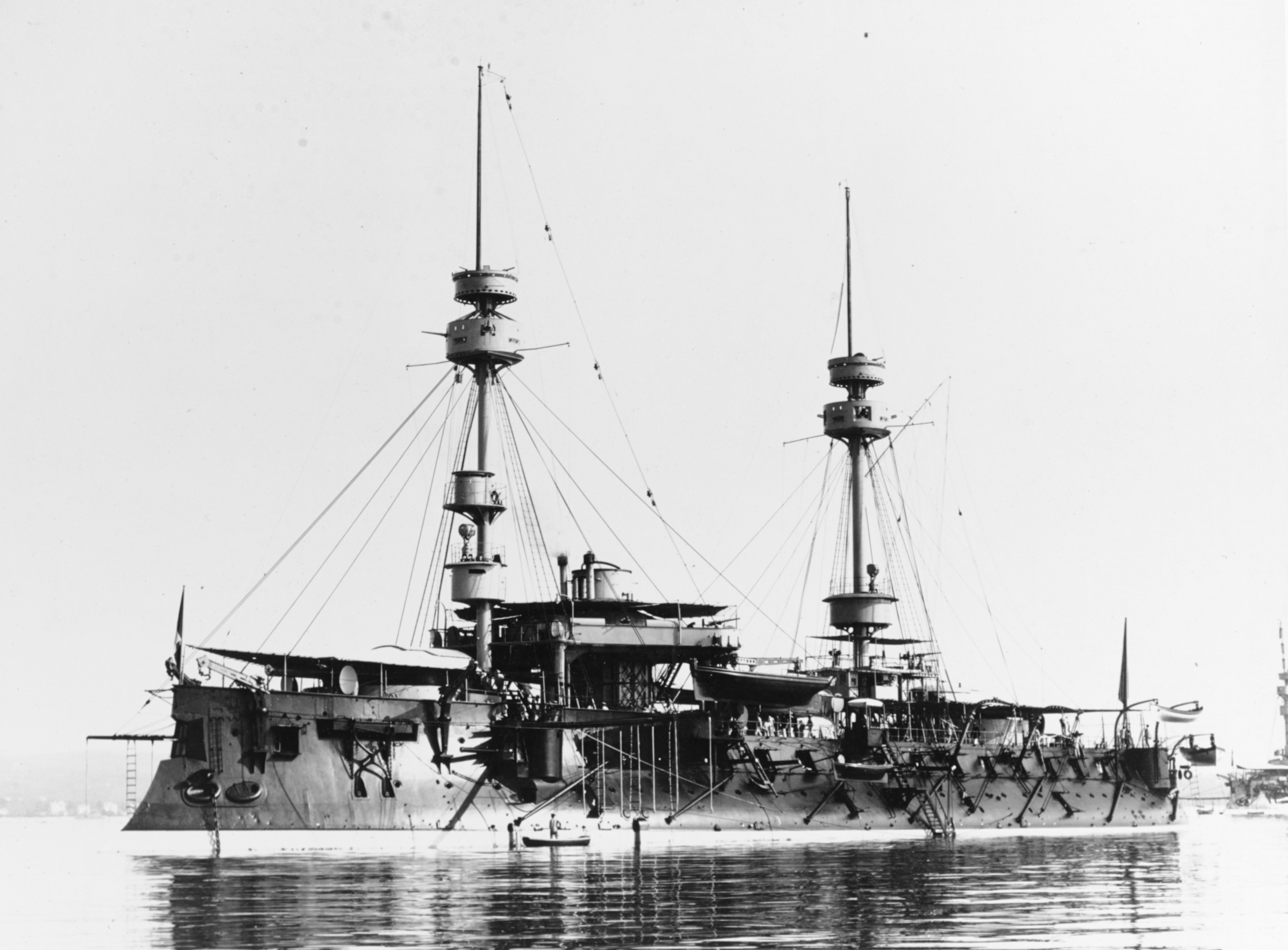
Amiral Baudin in her original configuration

Amiral Baudin ordered on 13 December 1878, and she was laid down on 1 February 1879 in Brest, France. She was launched on 5 June 1883 and the installation of her propulsion system was carried out between 22 September 1884 and 12 January 1887. She was commissioned for sea trials on 1 May 1888, and she spent the rest of the year under evaluation. The ship was finally placed in full commission on 21 January 1889, and she departed for Toulon on 5 February, arriving there ten days later. Amiral Baudin thereafter served in the 1st Division, Mediterranean Squadron, along with her sister Formidable, and Amiral Duperré. She took part in the annual fleet maneuvers that year in company with her division-mates and six other ironclads, along with numerous smaller craft. Amiral Baudin served as part of the simulated enemy force during the maneuvers, which lasted from 30 June to 6 July. During the 1890 fleet maneuvers, Amiral Baudin served in the 3rd Division of the 2nd Squadron of the Mediterranean Fleet. At the time, the division also included the ironclads Redoutable and Trident. The ships concentrated off Oran, French Algeria on 22 June and then proceeded to Brest, arriving there on 2 July for combined operations with the ships of the Northern Squadron. The exercises began four days later and concluded on 25 July, after which Amiral Baudin and the rest of the Mediterranean Fleet returned to Toulon.

During the fleet maneuvers of 1891, which began on 23 June, Amiral Baudin was transferred to the 2nd Division, 1st Squadron along with Redoutable and the ironclad Hoche. The maneuvers lasted until 11 July. The ship remained in service with the Mediterranean Fleet in 1892, which by that time had been joined by the three Marceau-class ironclads. Beginning on 24 October, the ship underwent a minor refit that included the alteration of her secondary battery; work lasted until 1 July 1893. She participated in the maneuvers that year, again as part of the 2nd Division in company with Amiral Duperré and Hoche. The maneuvers included an initial period of exercises from 1 to 10 July and then larger-scale maneuvers from 17 to 28 July.

She remained in the 1st Squadron in 1895, by which time it had been reduced in size to Amiral Baudin, Formidable, the three Marceaus, Courbet, and Dévastation. During that year's maneuvers, which began on 1 July, the 1st Squadron conducted a training cruise and practice shooting while the Reserve Squadron mobilized its ships. The main period of exercises saw the fleet divided into three units and Amiral Baudin was assigned to the third unit, tasked with defending Ajaccio from the other two fleets. The maneuvers concluded on 27 July. On 13 November, while the fleet was steaming into Hyères, Formidable turned too widely and led the line of ironclads into shallow water. Both she and Amiral Baudin ran aground; the latter had to be lightened by around 1,200 long tons (1,219 t) over the course of the next two days before she could be pulled free. The ship was not damaged in the accident, despite having been aground for two days.

=== 1896–1911 ===
Amiral Baudin after her refit

Amiral Baudin remained in active service with the Mediterranean Fleet in 1896. That year's maneuvers lasted from 6 to 30 July and took place off the coast of French Algeria. The next year, the ship was withdrawn from service to be modernized. The work included replacing her central main gun with a battery of four 163 mm guns in open single mounts. She also had her mainmast removed. Work on the ship was completed the next year, in time for Amiral Baudin to take part in the 1898 maneuvers, which lasted from 5 to 25 July. Later that year, she was transferred to the Northern Squadron in the English Channel, along with her sister, Amiral Duperré, Dévastation, Courbet, and Redoutable, since more modern pre-dreadnought battleships built in the mid-1890s had entered service by that time.

Two of these new battleships—Carnot and Masséna—joined Amiral Baudin in the Northern Squadron in 1900, which at that time also included Formidable, Redoutable, and Amiral Duperré, though the latter two vessels were withdrawn from service to be modernized that year. In June and July that year, she participated in extensive joint maneuvers conducted with the Mediterranean Fleet. The Northern Squadron initially held its own maneuvers in Brest, which included a simulated blockade of the squadron in Brest, after which the squadron made mock attacks on the island of Belle Île and nearby Quiberon. In early July, the squadron met the Mediterranean Squadron off Lisbon, Portugal before the two units steamed north to Quiberon Bay and entered Brest on 9 July. Amiral Baudin and the rest of the Northern Squadron were tasked with attacking Cherbourg two days later. The maneuvers concluded with a naval review in Cherbourg on 19 July for President Émile Loubet. On 23 November, Amiral Baudin collided with the old cruiser D'Estaing, which had recently returned from a deployment to Madagascar; both vessels were damaged in the accident.

The Northern Squadron remained unchanged for 1901, apart from the addition of Hoche. During the fleet maneuvers that year, the Northern Squadron steamed south for joint maneuvers with the Mediterranean Fleet. The Northern Squadron ships formed part of the hostile force, and as it was entering the Mediterranean from the Atlantic, represented a German squadron attempting to meet its Italian allies. The exercises began on 3 July and concluded on 28 July. In August and September, the Northern Squadron conducted amphibious assault exercises. On 28 August, they escorted a group of troop ships from Brest to La Rochelle. The ships conducted a simulated bombardment of the port, neutralized the coastal defenses, and put some 6,000 men ashore. On 9 March 1902, Amiral Baudin, was transferred to the Reserve Squadron in the Mediterranean Fleet, along with Carnot, and Hoche. She was briefly recommissioned to replace the old ironclad Couronne during a re-boilering before being returned to reserve status on 7 November 1904. She was placed in special reserve at Toulon on 25 April 1907, then decommissioned on 15 May 1908. Following her removal from the naval register on 6 June 1909, she replaced Var as a barracks ship. Amiral Baudin was condemned on 31 October 1910, placed for sale on 1 August 1911, and sold to a M. Benédic and broken up.
