= Nicolas Baudin Island =

Island in South Australia

- Location within South Australia

Geography
- Location: Great Australian Bight
- Coordinates: 33°00′58″S 134°07′50″E
- Area: 10 ha (25 acres)

Administration
- Australia

Demographics
- Population: 0

Nicolas Baudin Island is an island in the Australian state of South Australia about 500 metres (1,600 feet) west of Cape Blanche on the west coast of Eyre Peninsula about 25 kilometres (16 miles) south south-west of the town of Streaky Bay. The island is notable as a breeding site for Australian sea lions. The island has enjoyed protected area status since 2003 when it became part of the Nicolas Baudin Island Conservation Park.

== Description ==
Nicolas Baudin Island is about 500 metres (1,600 feet) west of Cape Blanche on the west coast of Eyre Peninsula in South Australia about 25 kilometres (16 miles) south south-west of the town of Streaky Bay.

The island was described in 2007 as follows:

The island is about 10 hectares (25 acres) in area and is surrounded by reefs on all but the landward (eastern) side. It is composed of large boulders and slabs of red-brown granite, as well as sandy areas and intertidal pools. Most of the island is low and partly inundated each high tide, with several elevated boulders forming the highest points.

Since January 2003, access to both to the island and the waters surrounding it have been prohibited as a regulatory measure to protect a breeding site for the Australian sea lion.

== Formation, geology and oceanography ==
Nicolas Baudin Island was formed between 6000 and 7700 years ago following the rise of sea levels at the start of the Holocene. The island's geology consists of a basement of a granite associated with the Gawler craton and which is bare of any remnants of overlying layers of rock. The island's north side drops into water of at least a depth of 15 metres (49 feet) while its west side drops to depth of 20 metres (66 feet). The sea bed falls to a depth of 50 metres (160 feet) about 2.2 kilometres (1.4 miles) to the west of the island.

== Flora and fauna ==
=== Flora ===
As of 2007, Nicolas Baudin Island is reported as not having any terrestrial vegetation.

=== Fauna ===
Surveys of fauna present on Nicolas Baudin Island have focused on vertebrates such as seal lions, seals and birds.

==== Sea lions and seals ====
The island is notable as a rookery for the Australian sea lion and as a haul out for New Zealand fur seals.

==== Birds ====
Surveys of bird life carried out from 2002 to 2005 revealed breeding populations of Pacific gull and sooty oystercatcher as well as sightings of the following species using the island as a roosting point: little penguin, short-tailed shearwater, Australasian gannet, little pied cormorant, black-faced cormorant, pied cormorant, little black cormorant, great cormorant, Australian pelican, white-faced heron, silver gull, caspian tern and crested tern.

== History ==
=== European discovery and use ===
Nicolas Baudin Island was not discovered by either of the expeditions led by Matthew Flinders and Nicolas Baudin. It was presumably identified during surveys carried out by the Government of South Australia following settlement in 1836 as ‘a result of the need to document South Australian waters and, in particular, their hazards, and to ascertain the nature of the coast for settlement.’ The island was informally known as Cape Blanche Island. The present name was selected in 2002 via a public competition held in association with the process to proclaim the island and its adjoining waters as a conservation park. The island's name officially declared in May 2003 after the proclamation of the conservation park in January 2003. The commercial fishing of greenlip abalone by the use of underwater diving methods takes place in the vicinity of the island. As of 2006, fishing by diving within the boundaries of the Nicolas Baudin Island Conservation Park is permitted by licence and only during periods outside of the breeding cycle of the Australian sea lion.

== Protected areas status ==
Nicolas Baudin Island received protected area status under the National Parks and Wildlife Act 1972 on 16 January 2003 as part of a conservation park that includes both the island and adjoining waters beyond the low water mark. The waters adjoining the island are also within a sanctuary zone in the West Coast Bays Marine Park.

== See also ==
- List of islands of Australia

== Citations and references ==
=== References ===
- South Australia. Department of Marine and Harbors (DMH) (1985), The Waters of South Australia a series of charts, sailing notes and coastal photographs, Dept. of Marine and Harbors, South Australia, ISBN 978-0-7243-7603-2
- Anon (2006). Island Parks of Western Eyre Peninsula Management Plan (PDF). Adelaide: Department for Environment and Heritage (DEH), South Australia. ISBN 1-921238-18-6.
- "Geographical Names Act 1991 - Notice to Assign a Name to a Place" (PDF). The South Australian Government Gazette. The Government of South Australia (GSA): 2066. 29 May 2003. Archived from the original (PDF) on 24 September 2015.
- Shaughnessy, Peter; Dennis, Terry (2007). "Nicolas Baudin Island, Eyre Peninsula, South Australia". Corella. 31 (3/4): 85–86.
- A.C., Robinson; Canty, P.; Mooney, T.; Rudduck, P. (1996). South Australia's offshore islands (PDF). Canberra: Australian Heritage Commission. ISBN 0-644350-11-3.
- "West Coast Bays Marine Park. Management plan 2012" (PDF). Department of Environment, Water and Natural Resources (DEWNR).
