= Baudin Rocks =

Group of islets in South Australia

- Location within South Australia

Geography
- Location: Limestone Coast
- Coordinates: 37°05′17″S 139°43′23″E
- Highest elevation: 12 m (39 ft)

Administration
- Australia

Baudin Rocks, also previously known as the Godfrey Islands, is a group of islets on the south east coast of in the Australian state of South Australia about 8.3 kilometres (5.2 miles) North-northwest of Robe. The islet group was discovered and named by Matthew Flinders in 1802 after Nicolas Baudin. The group has had protected area status since 1965 and since 1972, the group has been part of the Baudin Rocks Conservation Park.

== Description ==
Baudin Rocks is a group of islets on the south east coast of South Australia about 8.3 kilometres (5.2 miles) north-northwest of the town of Robe. The group consists of two major islets and at least 17 smaller islets with a total area about 5 hectares (12 acres). The maximum elevation is 12 metres (39 feet). As of 1996, the smaller northern islet is the most accessible in the group, having a sandy beach on its north-western corner.

== Formation, geology and oceanography ==
Baudin Rocks was formed about 6000 years ago when sea levels rose at the start of the Holocene. The island group and adjoined submerged reef are composed of Bridgewater Formation calcareous sandstone. The island group is part of a submerged ridge that rises from a depth of 10 m (33 ft) within 400 m (1,300 ft) to 800 m (2,600 ft) on the group’s west side while on its east and south side while the same transition occurs over respectively distances of approximately 400 m (1,300 ft) and 1,600 m (5,200 ft).

== Flora and fauna ==
=== Flora ===
As of 1996, the two larger islets were reported as having vegetation and this is limited to both the east-northeast and to about 50% of the total surface area of these islets. The dominant species is the low, sprawling Nitre bush. Surveys reported in both 1994 and 1996 have completely different lists of less dominant species. As of 1994, the other species included leafy sea heath, ruby saltbush, coastal lignum and leafy peppercress while the introduced African boxthorn occurred on the south islet. As of 1996, the other species present on the northern islet as of 1996 included bower spinach, austral seablite, southern sea-heath, a single bush of African boxthorn and possibly variable groundsel. The larger south islet which had not been visited at the time of reporting in 1996 was "reported to have many shrubs of the native Australian Box thorn".

=== Fauna ===
As reported in both 1994 and 1996, fauna surveys indicate that about 30 species of birds live or breed on Baudin Rocks, including the little penguin, black-faced cormorant, crested tern, fairy tern and the bridled tern. The nankeen night heron is reported as breeding on the southern islet. A colony of Australian sea lions was reported as being present on the north islet as of 1994. A feral pigeon control program was undertaken during 1982 and 1983 with assistance from the South East Field and Game Association. As of 1996, evidence of presence of both sparrow and an unidentified predatory bird presumably from the mainland was found respectively in the form of a "single nest was found in the African Boxthorn bush" and "regurgitated pellets containing the bones of small mammals".

== History ==
=== Aboriginal use ===
As of 1996, the literature had not cited any archaeological discoveries specific to Aboriginal use of land on Baudin Rocks. However, the anthropologist Norman Tindale did state in 1941 that on the basis of a partial translation of a song recorded in 1937 that Baudin Rocks may be of cultural significance to the Baundik people of the lower south east of South Australia particularly in respect to a legend known as "the Emu and the Native Companion".

=== European discovery and use ===
Baudin Rocks was discovered on 13 April 1802 by Matthew Flinders and named after Nicolas Baudin. The group was named Godfrey Islands in 1843 by Colonel Frame after Godfrey Thomas, stepbrother of George Grey, the Governor of South Australia. In 1831, John Hart, then the master of the schooner Elizabeth and later a Premier of South Australia, left a man on Baudin Rocks to carry out sealing. This appears to be the only record of sealing in the area. Baudin Rocks is one of the island sites from which guano was mined under licence from the South Australian Government prior to 1919.

== Protected areas status ==
Baudin Rocks first acquired protected area status as a Fauna Reserve proclaimed under the Fauna Conservation Act 1964 on 17 August 1965. Since the enactment of the National Parks and Wildlife Act 1972 in 1972, the group has been part of the Baudin Rocks Conservation Park.
