= Nicolas Baudin Island Conservation Park =

Protected area in South Australia

- IUCN category Ia (strict nature reserve)
- Location within South Australia
- Location: South Australia
- Nearest city: Streaky Bay.
- Coordinates: 33°0′58″S 134°7′50″E
- Area: 94 ha (230 acres)
- Established: 16 January 2003
- Governing body: Department for Environment and Water

Nicolas Baudin Island Conservation Park is a protected area associated with Nicolas Baudin Island which is located off Cape Blanche on the west coast of Eyre Peninsula in South Australia about 30 kilometres (19 miles) south of Streaky Bay. The conservation park was proclaimed in 2003 under the National Parks and Wildlife Act 1972 to "protect a significant breeding location for the Australian sea lion".

Nicolas Baudin Island's significance is argued as follows:

Recent research has confirmed that the park is of great importance as a breeding colony for a large population of Australian sea lions and is considered important in the association of sea-lions and New Zealand fur seals living side by side. South of the park, Point Labatt is the site of the largest mainland breeding colony of Australian sea lions, thought to interact heavily with the Nicolas Baudin Island colony.

Its extent includes the island with an area of about 10 hectares (25 acres) and adjoining seabed with a total area of 94 hectares (230 acres). Part of the conservation park were declared as a prohibited area at the day of establishment to prevent any disturbance of the breeding cycle of the Australian sea lion and New Zealand fur seal population.

The conservation park including its marine zone is classified as an IUCN Category Ia protected area.
