= Baudin Rocks Conservation Park =

Protected area in South Australia

- IUCN category Ia (strict nature reserve)
- Location within South Australia
- Location: South Australia
- Nearest city: Robe
- Coordinates: 37°5′23″S 139°43′24″E
- Area: 6 ha (15 acres)
- Established: 19 August 1965
- Governing body: Department for Environment and Water

Baudin Rocks Conservation Park is a protected area occupying Baudin Rocks on the south east coast of South Australia about 8.3 kilometres (5.2 miles) north-northwest of Robe. In 1965, the island was declared as a fauna reserve under the Fauna Conservation Act 1964 following a request from the Kingston Branch of the National Trust of South Australia to declare "a reserve to afford protection to the wildlife population". The protected area status was retained following the enactment of the National Parks and Wildlife Act 1972 in 1972 when it was renamed as the Baudin Rocks Conservation Park.

The conservation park is categorised as an IUCN Category IA protected area. In 1980, it was listed on the now-defunct Register of the National Estate.

== See also ==
- Protected areas of South Australia
