= Robert Baudin =

Robert Baudin (1918–1983) was an American counterfeiter, conman and aerial photographer.

Baudin was born in the United States. He started counterfeiting during the depression and World War II, after the war he "made" US$2,000,000 and eventually moved to Australia. He served a jail sentence in Australia for printing of currency. His autobiography is titled Fake: The Passing Fortunes of a Counterfeiter.

In 1980 he was acquitted of charges of extortion, when he flew his airplane at low altitudes around New York City, to protest against his publisher's editing of his book's American edition. He had undertaken a very similar protest with a small plane in Sydney, in 1969, just before his trial for counterfeiting.

== Works ==
- Baudin, Robert. Fake - The Passing Fortunes of a Counterfeiter. Methuen of Australia (1977). ISBN 0-454-00034-0
