= Winnit Club =

The Winnit Club is a voluntary service organisation that has been going to Rottnest Island since 1931. Primarily the Winnits do work on the island under the direction of the Rottnest Island Authority that benefits all those who use the island for work and recreation. Club members raise funds and provide their expertise and labour for many of these requirements. The club specialises in the construction of access boardwalks and stairs.

== Projects ==
Some of the activities club members have been involved with include:

- Raised the funds to build the island's first nursing post in 1960 and paid the wages of the nurse Fay Sullivan
- The original "Quokka Shelter" and West End board walk
- Installing emergency lighting at the airport
- Restoration of the Oliver Hill Gun Battery
- Installation of stairs at Bathurst Lighthouse, Salmon Bay, Fay's Bay and Narrow Neck
- Paving of the P Hut and train shed, construction of the Oliver Hill Railway station platforms and shelters
- Painting the seawall twice from end to end
- Maintaining the museum
- Beach access paths and all of the fencing from Villa Kitson to Bathurst Lighthouse
- Restoring the headstones, fencing and maintaining the cemetery
- Survey of the coastal risk signs and developing a database including the GPS location of each sign.
- Constructing the boardwalk at the West End
- Constructing the stairs from Pinky's Beach to the Bathurst lighthouse
- The steps and fencing at Geordie Bay
- Installation of five environmentally friendly toilets costing $650,000 at Parker point
- $141,000 grant from Coastwest to construct the walkway and tiered stairs at Henrietta Rocks (in conjunction with the Rottnest Society and the Rottnest Foundation)
