= Rottnest Express =

- Founder: Alan Kitcher
- Headquarters: Fremantle, Australia
- Parent: Journey Beyond
- Website: www.rottnestexpress.com.au

Rottnest Express operates ferry services between Fremantle and Rottnest Island in Western Australia. It is a subsidiary of Journey Beyond

== History ==
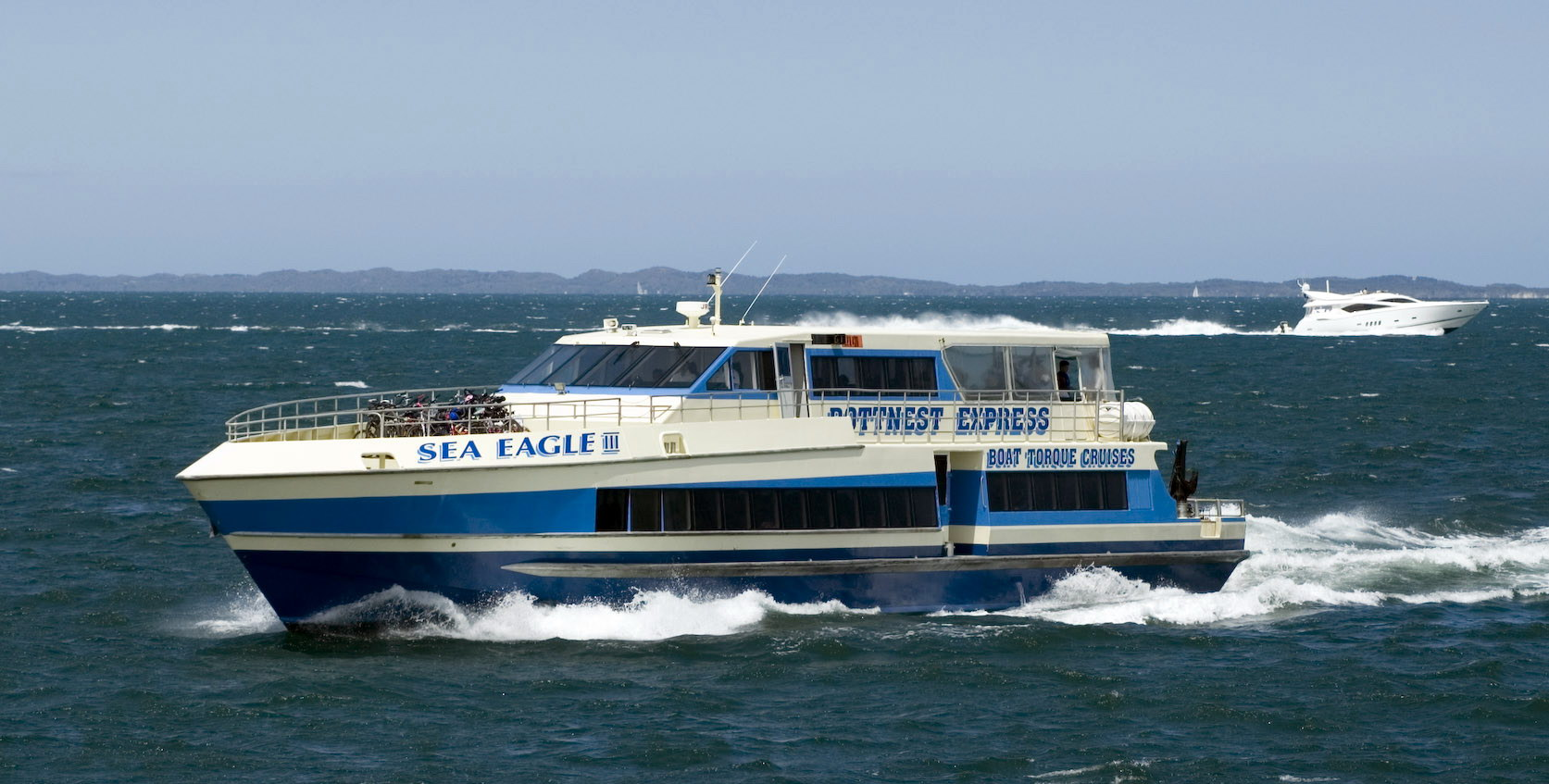
Sea Eagle III in February 2006

Star Flyte Express in November 2024

In the 1950s Alan Kitcher began operating a service between Fremantle and Rottnest Island with a 44 seat wooden hulled launch named The Temeraire. After Kitcher died, the business passed to his two sons, Trevor and Ron. In 1971 the 700 seat Temeraire II was commissioned followed in 1972 by the first high-speed ferry, the Hydroplane.

In 2002 the business was sold to Don Brown and Don Dunbar who rebranded the business Rottnest Express. In July 2007 the business was purchased by the Baileys Marine Group. In November 2016, Rottnest Express was purchased by Journey Beyond.

== Services ==
As at October 2026 eight services per day are operated from Barrack Street Jetty, Fremantle (Northport and B Shed) to Rottnest Island.

== Fleet ==
As at October 2026, the fleet consisted of three high speed ferries designed by SBF Marine Solutions.:

- Star Flyte Express, built 1988
- Sea Eagle III, built 1996
- Eagle Express, built 1999
