= Rottnest Island =

Island off the coast of Western Australia

Rottnest Island Wadjemup
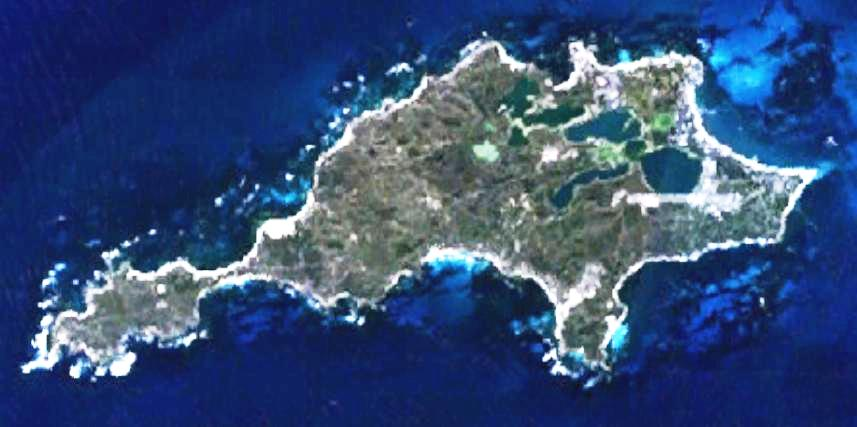
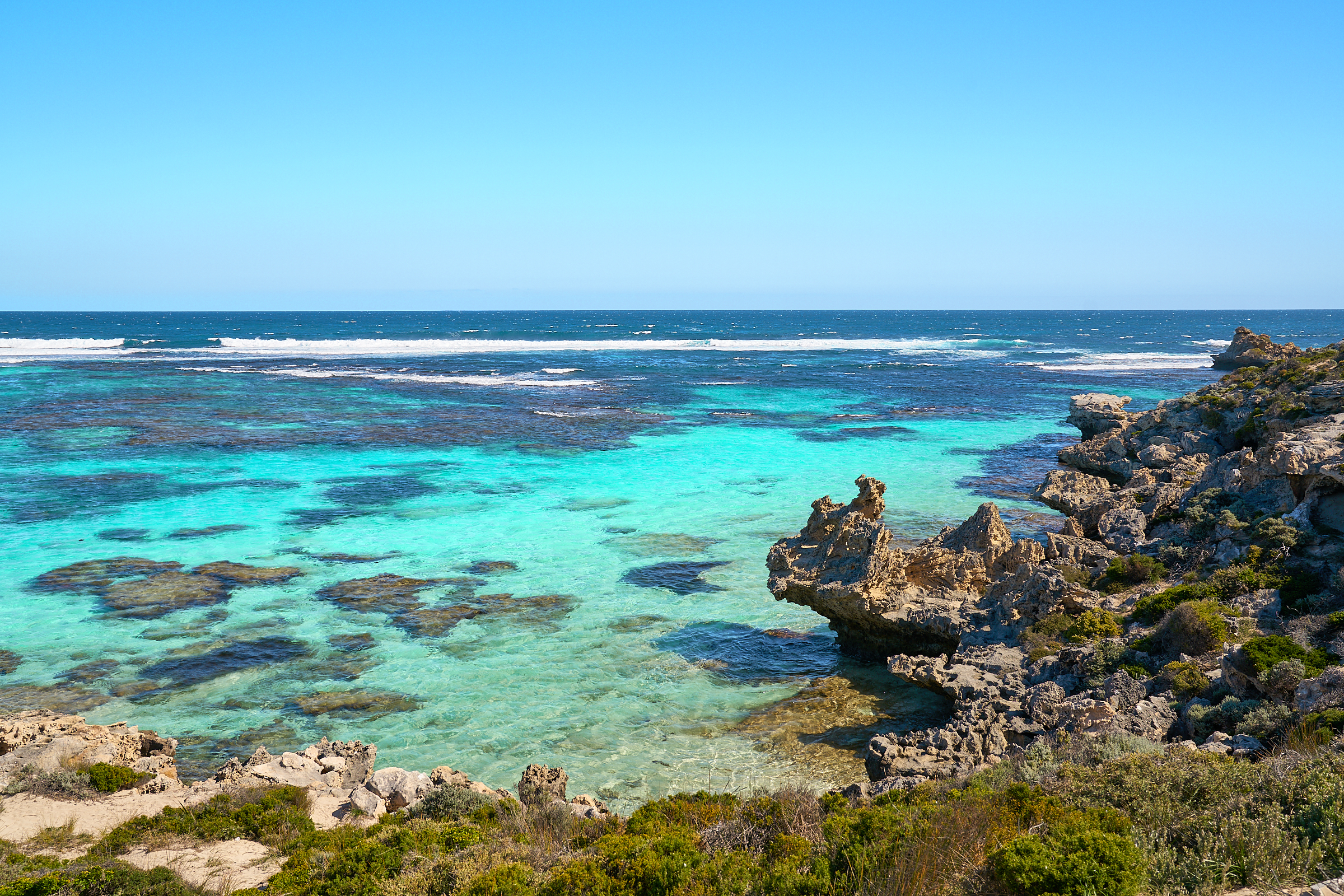
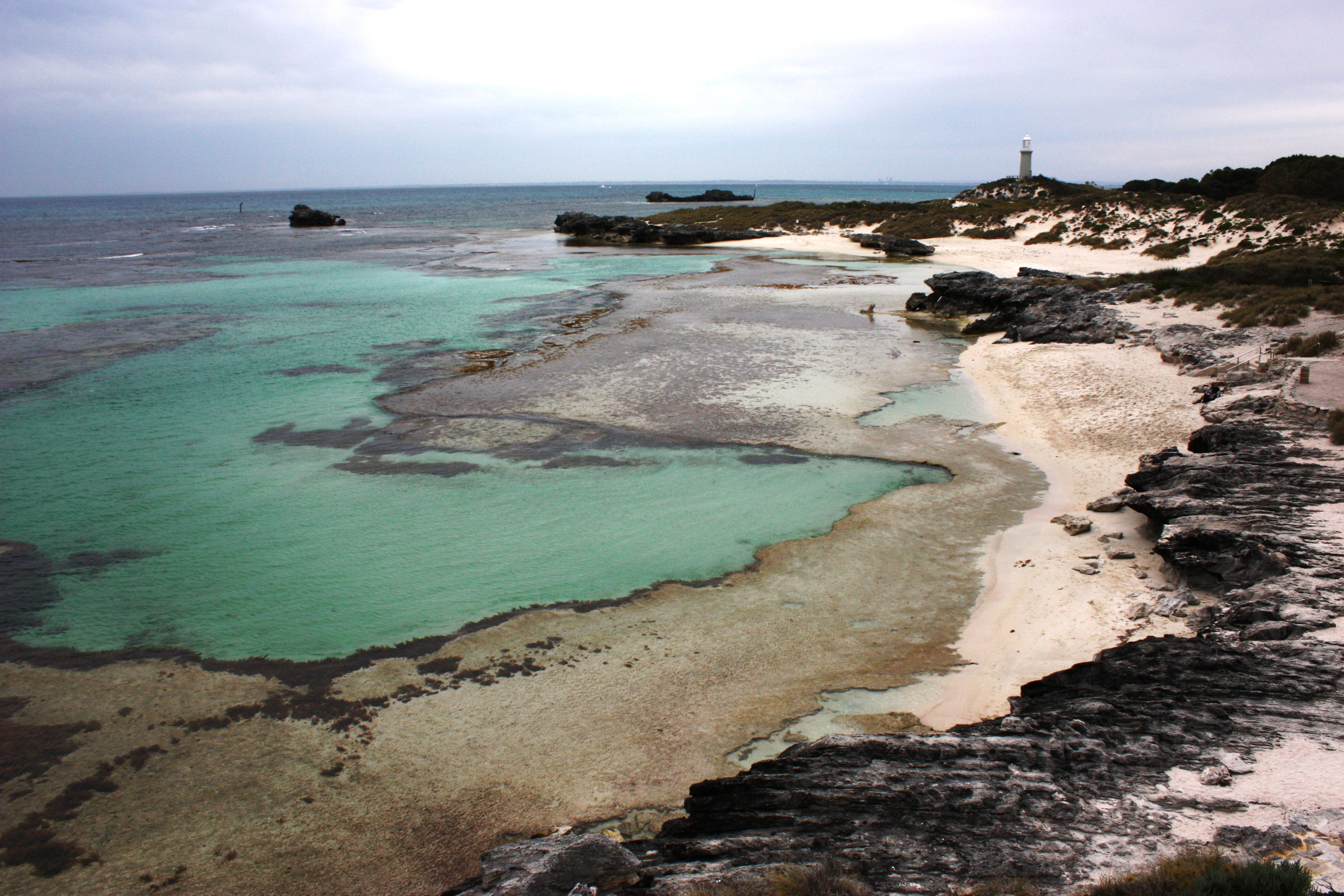
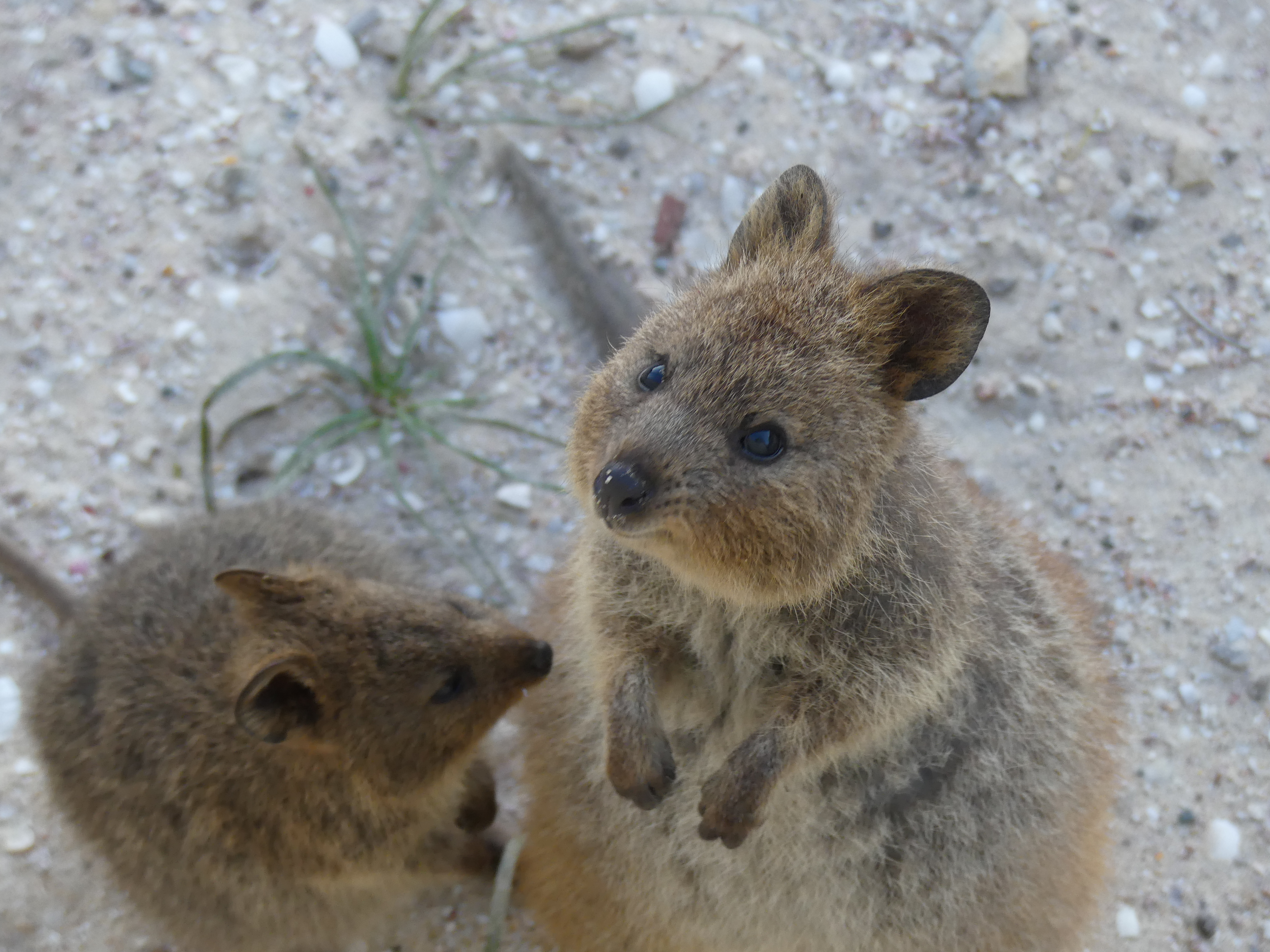
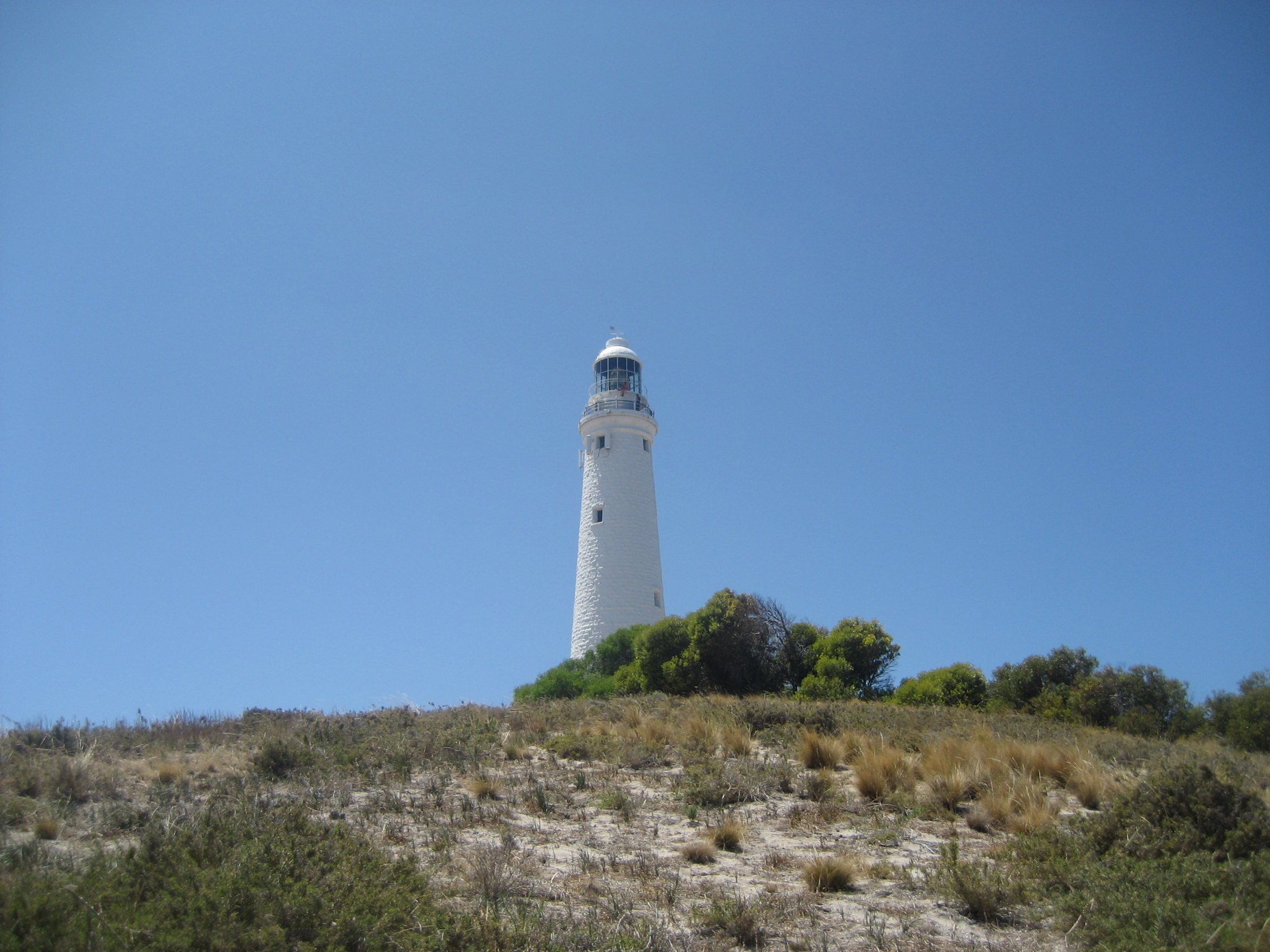
- Clockwise from top: Rottnest Island from space; the Basin; Wadjemup Lighthouse, quokkas; and Parker Point

- Coordinates: 32°00′18″S 115°30′54″E
- Country: Australia
- State: Western Australia
- LGA: City of Cockburn
- Location: 18 km (11 mi) W of Fremantle

Government
  - State electorate: Fremantle
  - Federal division: Fremantle

Area
  - Total: 19 km^{2} (7.3 sq mi)
- Elevation: 46 m (151 ft)

Population
  - Totals: 166 (SAL 2021); 15,000 (during peak holiday periods)
- Time zone: UTC+8 (AWST)
- Postcode: 6161
- Mean max temp: 21.5 °C (70.7 °F)
- Mean min temp: 14.9 °C (58.8 °F)
- Annual rainfall: 702.3 mm (27.65 in)

Rottnest Island (Wajuk: Wadjemup), nicknamed Rotto, is a 19-square-kilometre (7.3 sq mi) island off the coast of Western Australia, 18 kilometres (11 mi) west of Fremantle. A sandy, low-lying island formed on a base of aeolianite limestone, it is an A-class reserve, the highest level of protection afforded to public land.

With Garden Island, Rottnest Island is a remnant of Pleistocene dune ridges. Along with several other islands, Rottnest became separated from the mainland when sea levels rose around 7,000 years ago. The traditional Noongar name for the island is Wadjemup, which means 'place across the water where the spirits are'. The earliest recorded human presence on Rottnest was at least 17,000 years ago, but visitation and habitation of the island by the Noongar people appears to have ceased following its separation from the mainland.

Rottnest was first documented by Willem de Vlamingh in 1696, who called it 't Eylandt 't Rottenest ('rats' nest island') after the quokka population. Following establishment of the Swan River Colony (now Perth) in 1829, the island was initially used by British settlers for agriculture, and a permanent settlement was built in Thomson Bay. From 1838 to 1931, Rottnest Island was used as a prison and forced labour camp for over 3,600 Aboriginal people, who were subjected to extremely harsh conditions.

Other past uses of the island include as a military site, and for internment camps housing enemy aliens. Many of the island's buildings date from the colonial period, often made from locally quarried limestone, and are now used as accommodation for holidays.

Rottnest is an unincorporated area with no local government, subject to direct administration by the government of Western Australia. It is administered by the state's Rottnest Island Authority (RIA), which on 1 July 2017 became part of the newly created Department of Biodiversity, Conservation and Attractions. Rottnest is known for its population of quokkas, and is also home to colonies of Australian sea lions and southern fur seals, as well as various birds and three native tree species, notably the Rottnest Island pine.

The island is a popular recreational and tourist destination, with daily ferry services from Perth, the state's capital and largest city. It has a permanent population of around 300 people, with around 780,000 annual visitors.

== History ==
=== Prehistory and archaeology ===
During the late Pleistocene, when sea levels were lower, present-day Rottnest Island, Carnac Island and Garden Island were attached to the Western Australian mainland by a low-lying carbonate sand plain. When sea levels were at their lowest, around 18,000 years ago, Rottnest would have formed "a conspicuous hill, high above the surrounding coastal plain" and approximately 12 kilometres (7.5 mi) west of the mainland coastline. Rising sea levels submerged the continental shelf and isolated Rottnest in the late Pleistocene and early Holocene, with separation from the mainland occurring approximately 6,500 years ago. Sea levels continued to rise and by around 5,900 years ago the modern salt lakes in the centre of Rottnest had been inundated, resulting in the formation of up to ten smaller islands. Subsequent regressions returned the island to a single insular landform.

Archaeological evidence exists for human occupation of Rottnest prior to its separation from the mainland, comprising stone artefacts found in palaeosols in various locations on the island. As of 2019, six chert artefacts and four calcrete artefacts have been identified from sites at Charlotte Point, Little Armstrong Bay and Bathurst Point. A feldspar pebble has also tentatively been identified as a gastrolith or manuport. Optically stimulated luminescence dating of the artefact-bearing palaeosols suggests the earliest recorded human presence on Rottnest was at least 17,000 years ago. It has been suggested that the relative lack of recorded artefacts may be due to site loss from sea level changes and due to Rottnest's exposed position rendering it less suitable for human occupation than lower-lying sites which were later submerged.

The Noongar name for Rottnest is Wadjemup, meaning 'place across the water where the spirits are'. There is no material evidence or oral tradition of Aboriginal occupation of Rottnest after its separation from the mainland and prior to European colonisation. A Noongar creation myth recorded by George Fletcher Moore in the 1830s held that Rottnest and other offshore islands "once formed part of the mainland, and that the intervening ground was thickly covered with trees; which took fire in some unaccountable way, and burned with such intensity that the ground split asunder with a great noise, and the sea rushed in between, cutting off these islands from the mainland". By the time of European exploration in the 1600s, the island is thought to have been unoccupied for thousands of years.

In 2006, the Federal Court of Australia ruled that native title did not exist over Rottnest Island, as part of a ruling that recognised the claim of the Noongar people to native title over the Perth metropolitan area. Rottnest Island was later included in the South West Native Title Settlement between the Western Australian government and the South West Aboriginal Land and Sea Council, which came into effect in 2021. The island is covered by an Indigenous Land Use Agreement between the state government and the Whadjuk people.

=== European exploration and settlement ===
The island was observed and explored by various Dutch, French and English maritime expeditions from around 1619 onward, including by Frederick de Houtman around 28 July 1619.

The first Europeans known to have landed on Rottnest Island were about 14 sailors from a Dutch expedition, including Abraham Leeman van Santwits from Waeckende Boey, who landed near Bathurst Point on 19 March 1658 while their ship was careened nearby. Waeckende Boey (under command of Samuel Volkersen (Note: Also spelt Volkersenn, Volkerson.)) had been searching for survivors of Vergulde Draeck, which had been wrecked off the western coast of Australia in April 1656.

Location of Rottnest Island, Western Australia

Volkersen described the island in his journal:

In slightly under 32° S. Lat. there is a large island, at about 3 miles' distance from the mainland of the South-land; this island has high mountains, with a good deal of brushwood and many thornbushes, so that it is hard to go over; here certain animals are found, since we saw many excrements, and besides two seals and a wild cat, resembling a civet-cat, but with browner hair. This island is dangerous to touch at, owing to the rocky reefs which are level with the water and below the surface, almost along the whole length of the shore; between it and the mainland there are also numerous rocks and reefs, and slightly more to southward there is another small island.

This large island to which we have been unwilling to give a name, leaving this matter to the Honourable Lord Governor-General's pleasure, may be seen at 7 or 8 miles' distance out at sea in fine weather. I surmise that brackish or freshwater might be obtainable there, and likewise good firewood, but not without great trouble.

— Samuel Volkersen, 1658

In his 1681 chart, English captain John Daniel marked an island as Maiden's Isle, possibly referring to Rottnest. The name did not survive, however.

The island was given the name 't Eylandt 't Rottenest (transl. Rats' Nest Island; the quokkas were mistaken for large rats) by Dutch captain Willem de Vlamingh, who spent six days exploring the island from 29 December 1696. De Vlamingh led a fleet of three ships, De Geelvink, De Nijptang and Weseltje, searching for the survivors of Ridderschap van Holland that had gone missing two years earlier, and anchored on the northern side of the island, near the Basin. He described the island as "pleasurable above all islands I have ever seen—a paradise on earth". During their time on the island, they found no people. Holes were dug on the island, yielding water of good drinking quality. They also noted that the wood from the trees on the island had an exquisite scent – akin to rosewood – and a quantity was cut and brought on board the ship.

Other explorers who stopped at the island included members of the French expedition of Nicholas Baudin in Naturaliste and Géographe in 1801 (when he planted a flag and left a bottle with a letter) and 1803, Phillip Parker King in 1822, and Captain James Stirling in 1827. Early visitors commonly reported that much of the island was heavily wooded, which is not the case today.

In 1831, shortly after the establishment of the British Swan River Colony at nearby Fremantle, William Clarke and Robert Thomson received land grants for town lots and pasture land on the island. Thomson immediately moved to the island with his wife and eight children. He developed pasture land for hay production west of Herschel Lake as well as salt harvesting from the several salt lakes which was then exported to the mainland settlement. Salt was an important commodity before the advent of refrigeration.

=== Aboriginal prison ===
The Colonial Secretary, Peter Broun, announced in June 1839 that the island would be converted to "an Establishment for the Aborigines", and between 1838 and 1931 (except for the period from 1849 to 1855) Rottnest was used as an Aboriginal prison. Henry Vincent, the Gaoler at Fremantle, was put in charge of the establishment. Six Aboriginal prisoners were sent to Rottnest Island in August 1838 under the superintendence of Constable Laurence Welch and a small military force: Helia, for murder; Buoyeen, for assault; Molly Dobbin, Tyoocan, Goodap and Cogat, for theft. All six escaped shortly after their arrival by stealing Thomson's boat. Helia drowned during the crossing, but the others apparently survived.

On 7 December 1848, there was another escape by Aboriginal prisoners, with eight out of the 10 prisoners then on the island escaping. Those who escaped came from the north and eastward. "The plan of escape, as related by one of themselves, exhibits considerable foresight and sagacity, being not only well conceived, but as well executed". The Aboriginals burrowed under the sill door until there was room for them to all pass underneath. They all then crept over the roof of Vincent's kitchen and proceeded to the salt house, through the window of which they got out a dinghy which was confined there. They then went to the pilot's whaleboat moored a short distance offshore, and succeeded in getting to the mainland 16 kilometres (10 mi) north of Fremantle. Five of the escapees were retaken by J. Drummond at Toodyay.

A quadrangular building was constructed between 1863 and 1864, and which is generally referred to as the Quod (deriving from the abbreviation quod for quadrangle); it was used for tourist accommodation until 2018, when it was closed after decades of protests by Aboriginal people. There were about twenty prisoners there in 1844; by 1880, there were 170. Vincent retired in 1867 after complaints regarding cruelty to prisoners; he was replaced by William Jackson. In the early 1880s, an influenza epidemic struck, killing about sixty inmates.

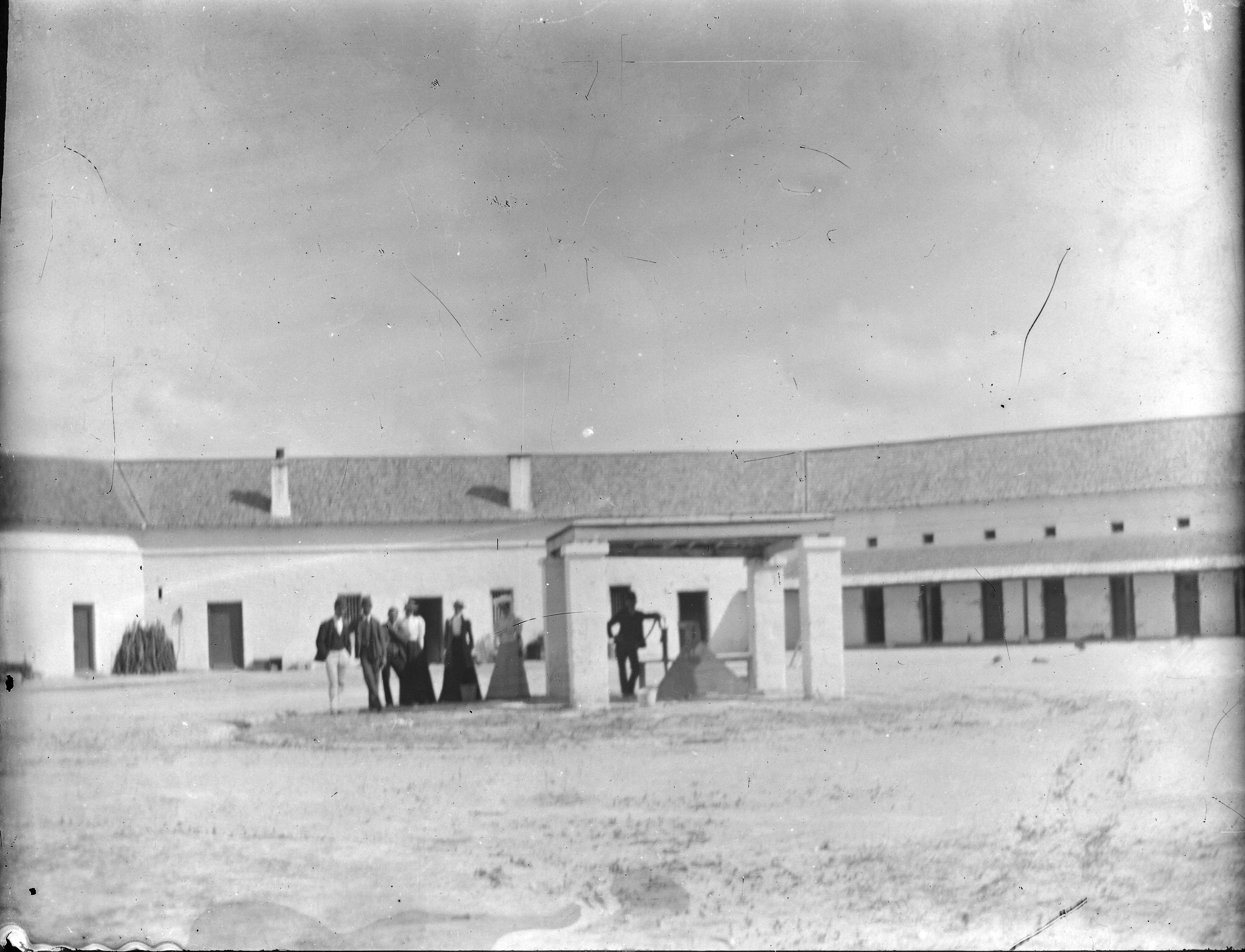
Visitors to the "Quod", early 1900s

In 1902, the abolition of the prison was announced. At that time, there were 33 Aboriginal prisoners serving sentences there. However, the prison continued to be used as a forced labour camp for Aboriginal prisoners until 1931.

Of the approximately 3,600 people imprisoned over the 93 years the prison existed, at least 373 people died and were buried in unmarked graves in at least two areas to the north of the Quod. It is the largest known deaths in custody grave site in Australia.. There may be as many as 369 inmates' graves on the island; one writer has suggested that 95% of the deaths were from influenza. In 2015—after numerous protests from local Aboriginal people for the Rottnest Island Authority to create a memorial recognising the events, deaths and unmarked graves which lie on Rottnest Island—work began on the Wadjemup Aboriginal Burial Ground. As of June 2016 buildings have been removed from the site and a pathway constructed around it. Prior to the closure of the tourist camp in 2018, the burial ground was being used as a spot to pitch tents..

Historical records note that the first cemetery, likely adjacent to the European cemetery, became full following an outbreak of influenza in 1883 and that a second was established further away from the prison. The area is now known as the Wadjemup Aboriginal Burial Ground. Although slavery, as legally defined, was never widespread in Western Australia (and, indeed, called blackbirding rather than plain slavery in the pearling industry), the "assignment" system effectively implemented a system of forced labour, and was condemned by Reverend J. B. Gribble and the Anti-Slavery Society. Aboriginal people who refused assignment were sent to Rottnest Island to be "civilised", and were used in chain gangs to perform hard labour, including farming, quarrying and collecting salt. Most of the island's historic Settlement—including Government House (Hotel Rottnest), the church, Salt Store, museum, gift shop, original waterfront cottages and The Quod—was built by forced Aboriginal prison labour working under extremely harsh conditions.

Artefacts from this period continue to be identified and recorded. Len Collard describes these artefacts, such as glass and ceramic spearheads, as an important demonstration of transitional cultural engineering through use of traditional methods to modify the new materials of European settlement.

==== Executions ====
Five Aboriginal prisoners were executed on Rottnest in the late 19th century, all for murder:

- Tampin (16 July 1879): Hanged for the murder of John Moir at Stokes Inlet on 29 March 1877
- Wangabiddi (18 June 1883): Hanged for the murder of Charles Redfern at Minni-Minni on the Gascoyne River in May 1882
- Guerilla (18 June 1883): Hanged for the murder of Anthony Cornish at Fitzroy River on 12 December 1882
- Naracorie (3 August 1883): Hanged for the murder of Charles Brackell at Wandagee on the Minilya River on 31 July 1882
- Calabungamarra (13 June 1888): Hanged for the murder of a Chinese man, Indyco, at Hamersley Range

=== Boys' reformatory ===
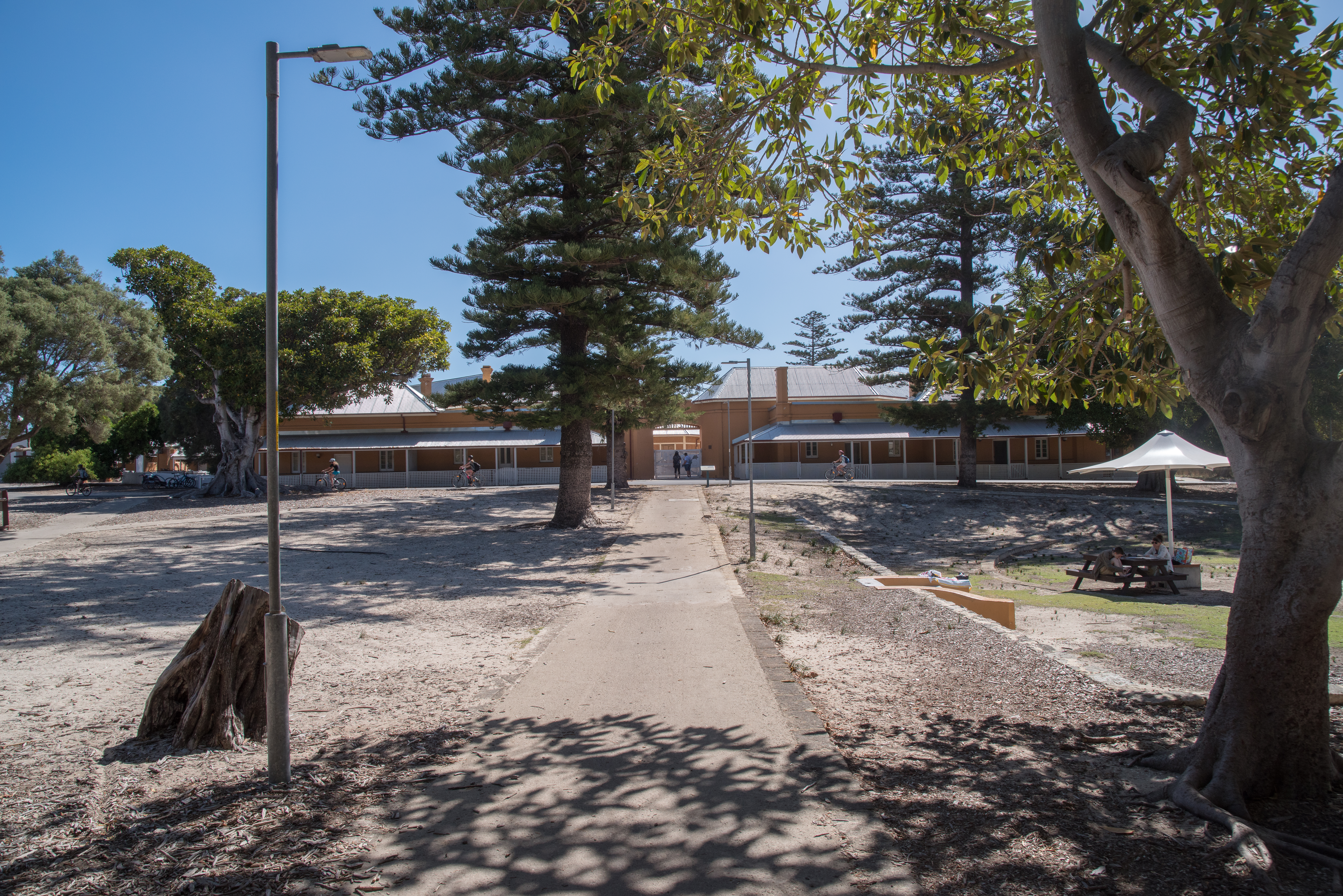
The Quod buildings in 2021

A reformatory for boys was opened on 16 May 1881. The reformatory buildings were adjacent to the Quod and included a workshop, a kitchen, two large dormitories, a school room and four small cells. Carpenter John Watson constructed the buildings and became the superintendent for the life of the establishment. Watson taught the boys carpentry, joinery and gardening.

During a severe influenza epidemic in 1883, the colonial surgeon, Alfred Waylen, directed one of the large rooms in the reformatory to be used as a hospital. An estimate of sixty Indigenous deaths for that year was given by eye-witness Edward Watson. In 1887, the prison superintendent reported one room in the reformatory still being used for sick prisoners, with two rooms used the previous winter, and made an appeal for a new hospital to be built for the Indigenous prisoners.

In May 1898, two boys disappeared, apparently drowned, after escaping from the reformatory and stealing a dinghy.

After 20 years of operation, the facility closed on 21 September 1901 when the remaining 14 inmates were transferred to an industrial school on the mainland.

The reformatory buildings were used as holiday accommodation as part of the Rottnest Lodge until 2022 when they were closed for redevelopment of more recently constructed parts of the site to create new accommodation and tourist facilities.

=== Fires ===
In 1856, the settlement structures—the two-storey prison / workshop building, stables, barns and piggery were burnt down. Their former locations are identified in the area between the shops in the settlement area. The fire was deliberately lit by the superintendent, Henry Vincent, after two prisoners had escaped into nearby bush. Vincent lit the fire with the intent of flushing the prisoners out of their hiding place. The prevailing winds at the time were blowing away from the buildings; however, the wind changed direction which brought the flames into the settlement. About 51 tonnes (110,000 lb) of hay was also destroyed.

Major bushfires occurred in March 1894, January 1910, January 1917, March 1939, February 1949, and a very significant fire which consumed around two-thirds of the island in 1955. Some of these bushfires were caused by European hunting parties and on one occasion almost wiped out the quokka population.

=== Pilot service ===
In 1846, a pilot service was established under Captain Edward Back. It continued for 56 years until 1903. (Note: The West Australian (1903) suggested that the service is no longer needed. The service closed the same year.) The pilot's and crews quarters were located in at least three of the colonial buildings identified in the colonial buildings of Rottnest Island – buildings 4, 5 and 6.

=== Internment camp ===
Rottnest was the site of internment camps in both World War I and World War II In World War I, it was mostly used for German and Austrian suspected enemy aliens, and was closed towards the end of the war, due to poor living conditions. The camp was sited near the present-day Caroline Thomson Camping Area.

In World War II, the camp was used exclusively for Italian enemy aliens and was situated near the airstrip. It had capacity for 120 internees.

It was closed about halfway through the war, and its occupants were sent to various other internment and work camps on the mainland.

=== Military history ===
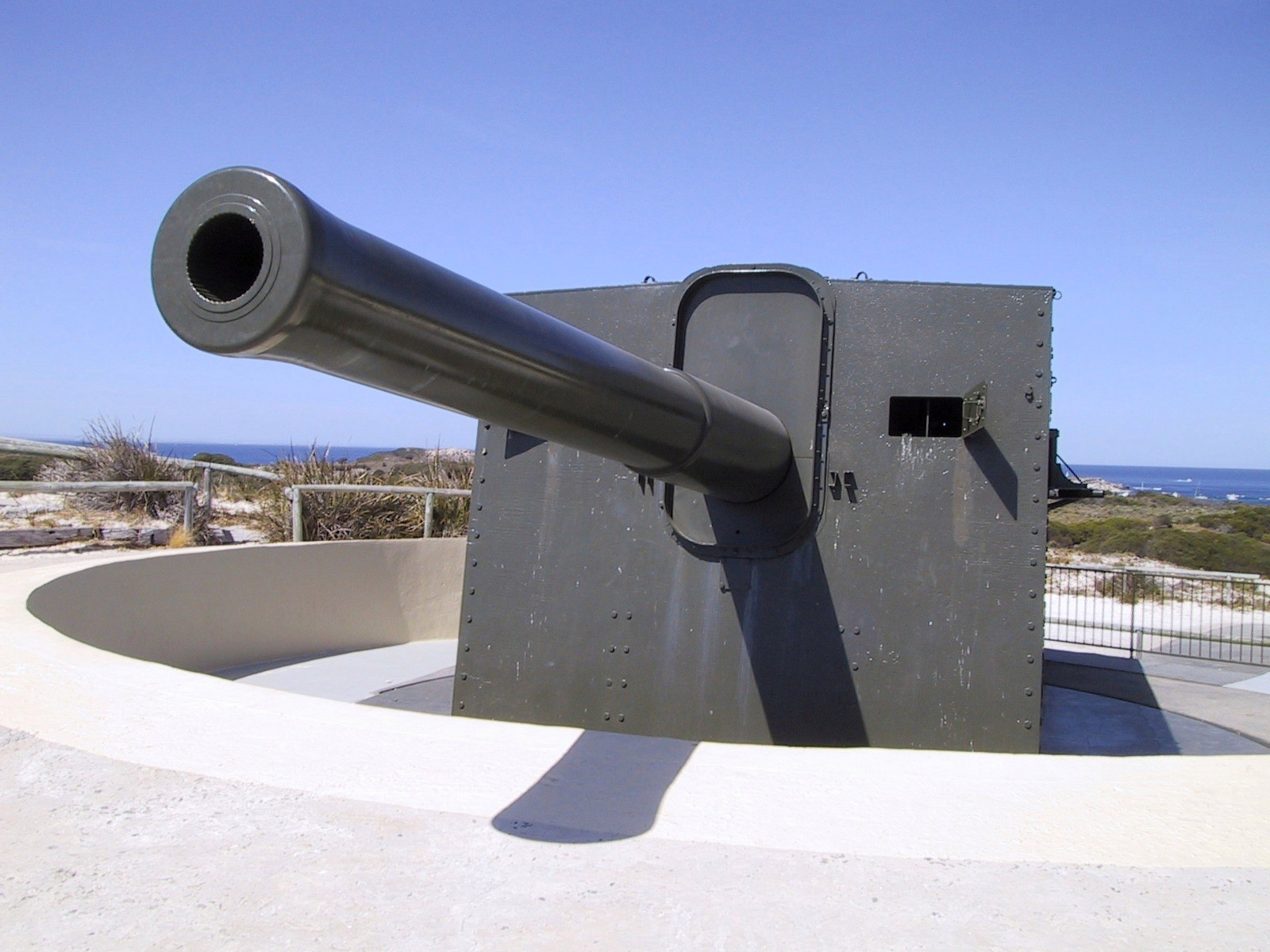
BL 9.2 inch Mk X gun at Oliver Hill

Also during World War II, two 9.2-inch guns were installed near the middle of the island at Oliver Hill, and two six-inch guns installed at Bickley Point, for defence of the Fremantle port. The location of the island was seen as being important to the defence of the important port of Fremantle, the major base for the Allies in the Indian Ocean, as bombardment of any attacking ships could be made from the island before the ships would come into range of the port.

A light railway was built from the jetty at Kingstown Barracks on Thomson Bay, to transport materiel and munitions to the guns. Captain (later Brigadier) Frank Bertram Hussey (1908–1985) was seconded from the Australian Staff Corps to oversee the construction of this. The military fixtures including the barracks and railway became known as the "Rottnest Island Fortress". A number of concrete lookouts and bunkers were built around the island also.

Near Wadjemup Lighthouse, a Battery Observation Post (BOP) was built as a lookout to coordinate aiming and firings from the Bickley and Oliver Hill Batteries. A Signals Building, associated with the BOP and a Women's Army Barracks, built to house officers and staff who operated the BOP were constructed there also. The latter building is used nowadays for occasional accommodation for University and other scientific research groups working on the island.

After World War II, the guns and infrastructure were decommissioned and parts of the railway removed. The 9.2-inch battery, however, was saved from disposal because the high cost of removing and shipping the guns to the mainland exceeded their value as scrap metal.

In the 1990s, the gun emplacements and railway were extensively reconstructed, and since then a popular tourist activity has included a tour of the guns and the tunnels, with the journey to the battery being made on a purpose-built train from Kingstown Barracks.

=== Communications ===
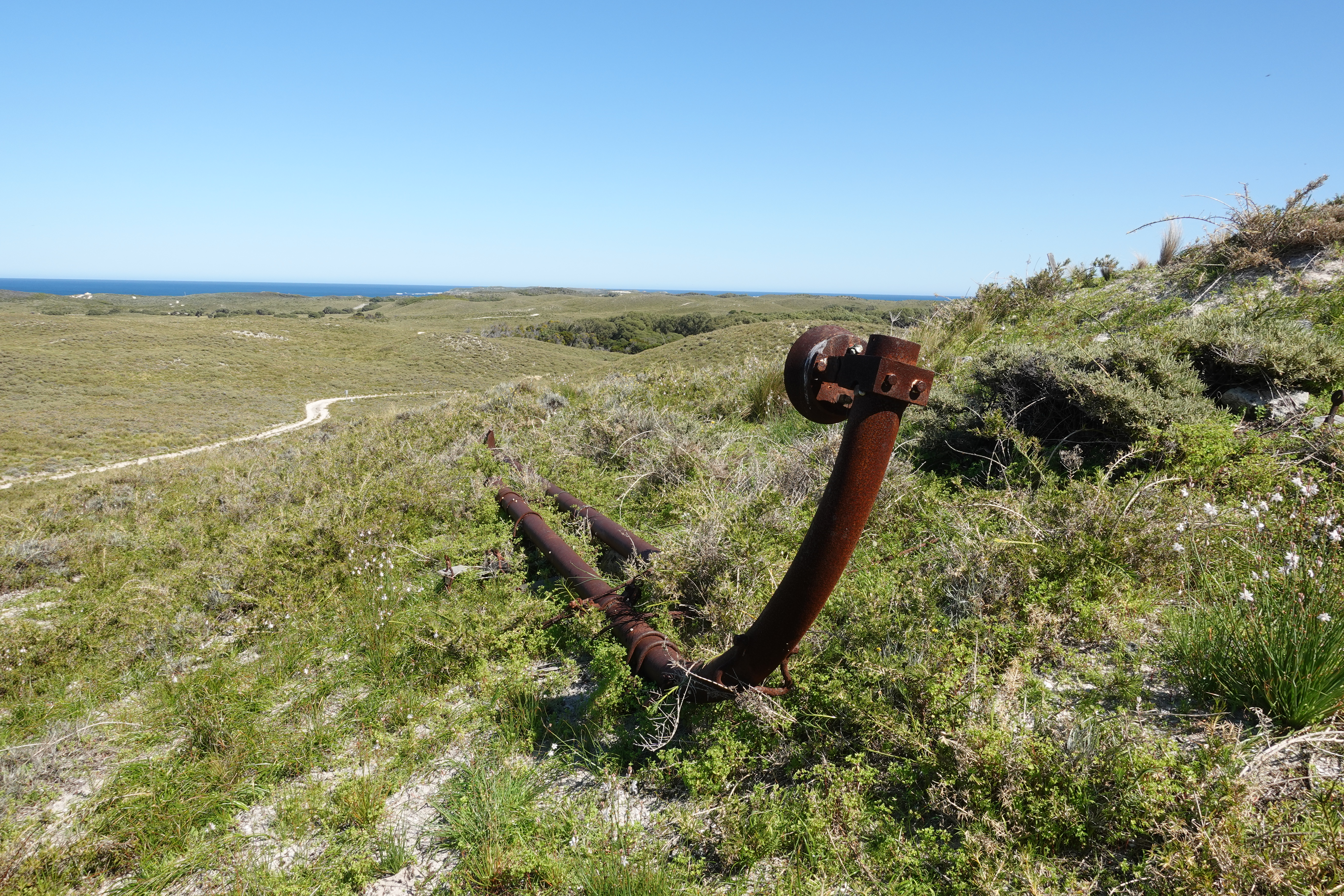
Ruins of the 1907 fog signal

Prior to about 1880, communication with the mainland was primarily with semaphore flags and flares. A staffed lookout at Bathurst Point included a signalling station which relayed shipping information between Wadjemup Lighthouse at the centre of the island and Arthur Head at Fremantle.

A heliograph was installed in 1879 at Signal Hill, the small rise overlooking the main settlement in Thomson Bay. A Frenchman by the name of Henri Courderot was the heliograph operator and was paid $10 per year to operate the service once a day weather permitting.

A single circuit submarine communications cable was laid from Cottesloe in 1900, after which the heliograph service was discontinued. This was replaced with a larger cable in 1935.

=== Administration ===
After Rottnest was proclaimed as an A-class Reserve in 1917, management was vested in the "Rottnest Island Board of Control" which continued until 1956. The first chairman was Hal Colebatch, who served from 13 May 1917 to 23 July 1956. Rottnest Island was declared an A class reserve under the Permanent Reserves Act in May 1917. A Board was then appointed under the Parks and Reserves Act to control and manage the island (excluding the lighthouse and prison reserve). The Board of Control became a Body Corporate in 1956 and became a Board of Management.

Between 24 July 1956 and 29 May 1988, it was changed to the "Board of Management". Section 3, subsection 4 of the Parks and Reserves Act 1895–1955 provided legislative scope for the Rottnest Island Board of Control became a Body Corporate on 24 July 1956. The Rottnest Island Board of Control became the Rottnest Island Board of Management

with power to sue and be sued in its corporate name, to acquire, hold, lease and dispose of real and personal property, to borrow money with the approval of the Governor and to do and permit to be done all things which are required by the Act to the be done by the Board"

until 1988 at which time it became the Rottnest Island Authority. During this time the managing instrumentality was informally and generally referred to as the "Rottnest Island Board" (RIB). In 1988 the "Rottnest Island Authority" commenced operations.

In May 1966, Rottnest Island and Carnac Island were included in the boundaries of the Shire of Cockburn, which became the City of Cockburn in 1971. However, the council has "no involvement in or responsibility for any functions relating to the control and management of the islands".

On 28 April 2017, the Government of Western Australia announced that the Department of Parks and Wildlife would merge with the Botanic Gardens and Parks Authority, the Zoological Parks Authority and the Rottnest Island Authority on 1 July 2017 to form the Department of Biodiversity, Conservation and Attractions. (Note: The Public Sector Commissioner has released the list of agency heads to lead the new departments in the medium term on 28 April 2017. This follows the Premier's announcement on significant public sector reform and structural changes across the public sector.)

Uniquely for Western Australia, the island is classified as a state reserve, called Rottnest Island State Reserve, being the only area in the state with this classification. The reserve extends beyond the island's shore and covers 5,669 hectares (14,010 acres).

=== COVID-19 pandemic ===
Between March and May 2020, during the COVID-19 pandemic in Australia, the island was used as a quarantine station for arriving tourists and returning Australians.

== Flora and fauna ==
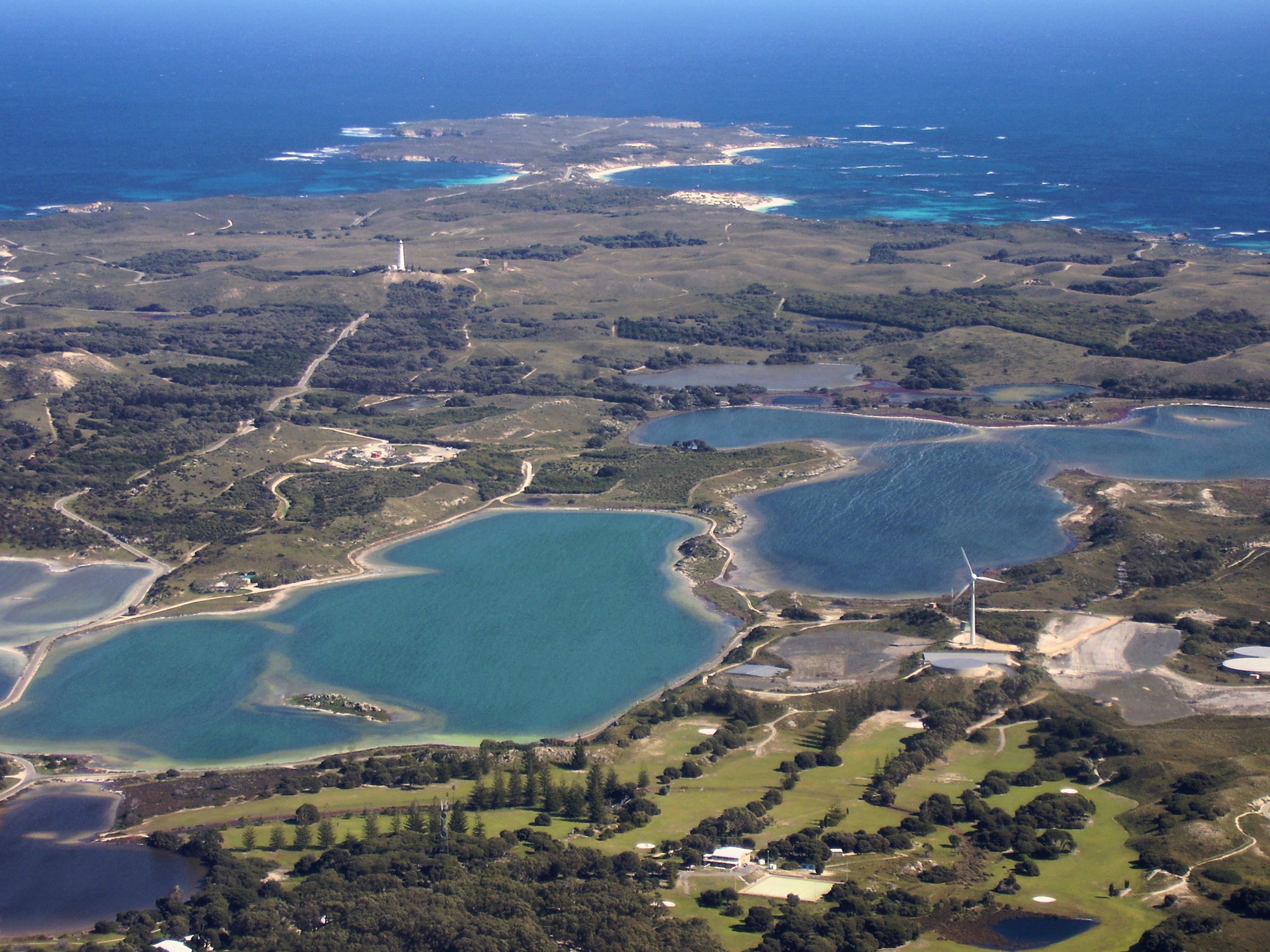
Naturally occurring salt lakes are a refuge for the abundant birdlife.

=== Birds ===
Many coastal birds are frequently found in Rottnest. These include the pied cormorant, osprey, pied oystercatcher, silver gull, crested tern, fairy tern, bridled tern, rock parrot and the reef heron. The island salt lakes contain brine shrimp which support birds such as the red-necked avocet, banded stilt, ruddy turnstone, curlew sandpiper, red-capped dotterel, Australian shelduck, red-necked stint, grey plover, white-fronted chat, Caspian tern and the crested tern. Several pairs of osprey nest at Rottnest each year; one nest at Salmon Point is estimated to be 70 years old. Introduced peafowl are often seen near the main settlement.

The island has been identified by BirdLife International as an Important Bird Area (IBA) because it supports important breeding populations of the fairy terns (200 to 300 breeding pairs), over 1% of the non-breeding population of banded stilts (with up to 20,000 birds) and regionally significant numbers of wedge-tailed shearwaters and red-necked stints.

=== Other animals ===
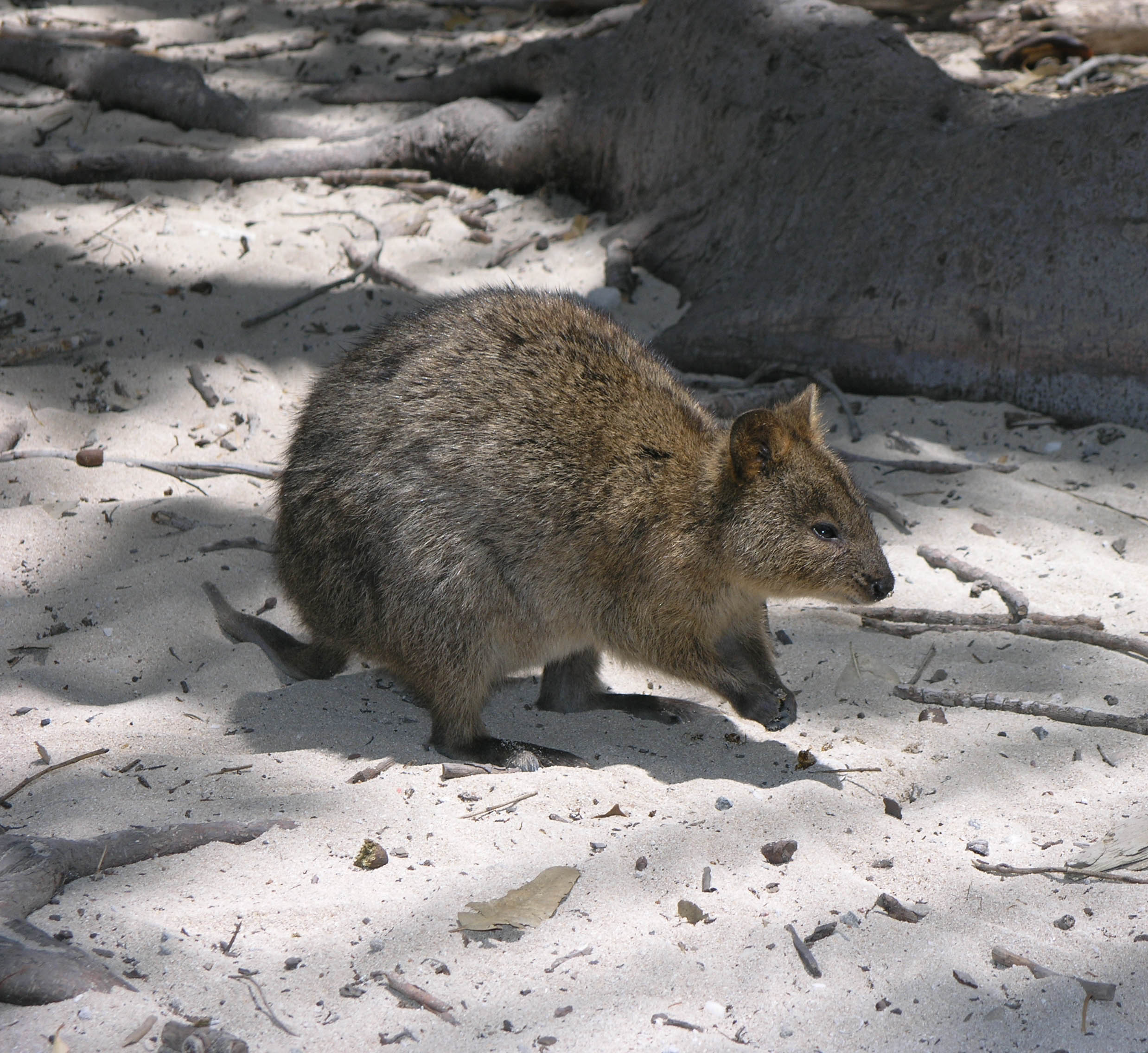
A Rottnest quokka

Rottnest is one of the few areas in the world where the native quokka can be found. Its survival there is largely due to the exclusion of natural or introduced predators compared to the mainland.

Reptiles include dugite (Pseudonaja affinis), the southern blind snake (Ramphotyphlops australis), King's skink (Egernia kingii), bobtail (Tiliqua rugosa), marbled gecko (Christinus marmoratus), west coast ctenotus (Ctenotus fallens) and Burton's legless lizard (Lialis burtonis). There are three species of frogs: the moaning frog (Heleioporus eyrei), the western green tree frog (Litoria moorei) and the sign-bearing froglet (Crinia insignifera).

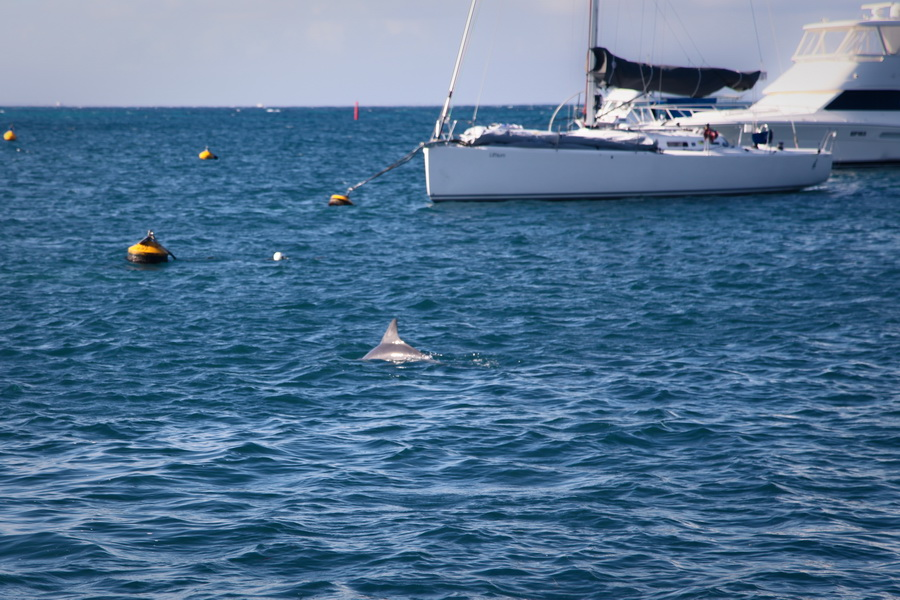
Dolphin in Thomson Bay

With the extensive reefs surrounding the island, many species of fish, crustaceans and coral can be found. Cetaceans such as bottlenose dolphins, and migrating humpbacks, and fewer southern rights, and the Perth Canyon off the island is one of main habitats for blue whales in Australia, for which there are also whale watching expeditions. A colony of Australian sea lions resides at Dyer Island and a colony of long-nosed fur seals resides at Cathedral Rocks.

=== Feral animals ===
Domestic cats were introduced to Rottnest both as pets and as predators of commensal pest animals such as the black rat and house mouse at various times since European settlement. Historically, the Rottnest Island Authority has attempted to rid the island of all cats since the 1960s. It was suggested that cats may be influencing the abundance of native fauna and if left uncontrolled, the cat population was likely to increase and could result in considerable damage to ground-nesting birds and heavy predation pressure on quokkas and reptile species.

A feral cat monitoring and trapping campaign was conducted in November 2001 and 2002. Four cats were trapped and no further cat activity has been observed or cats sighted by Rottnest Island staff or the general public in the eight years subsequent to this program suggesting that eradication has been successfully achieved.

In 2008, the island implemented a pest bird management plan to target birds considered to be pest species, including silver gulls, Australian ravens, common (ring-necked) pheasant, galahs, peafowl and rainbow lorikeets. Peafowl were believed to have been released on the island between 1910 and 1915. During the late 1950s, the population reached no more than fifty birds. Only three males (peacocks) were left after a 2009 cull.

=== Plants ===
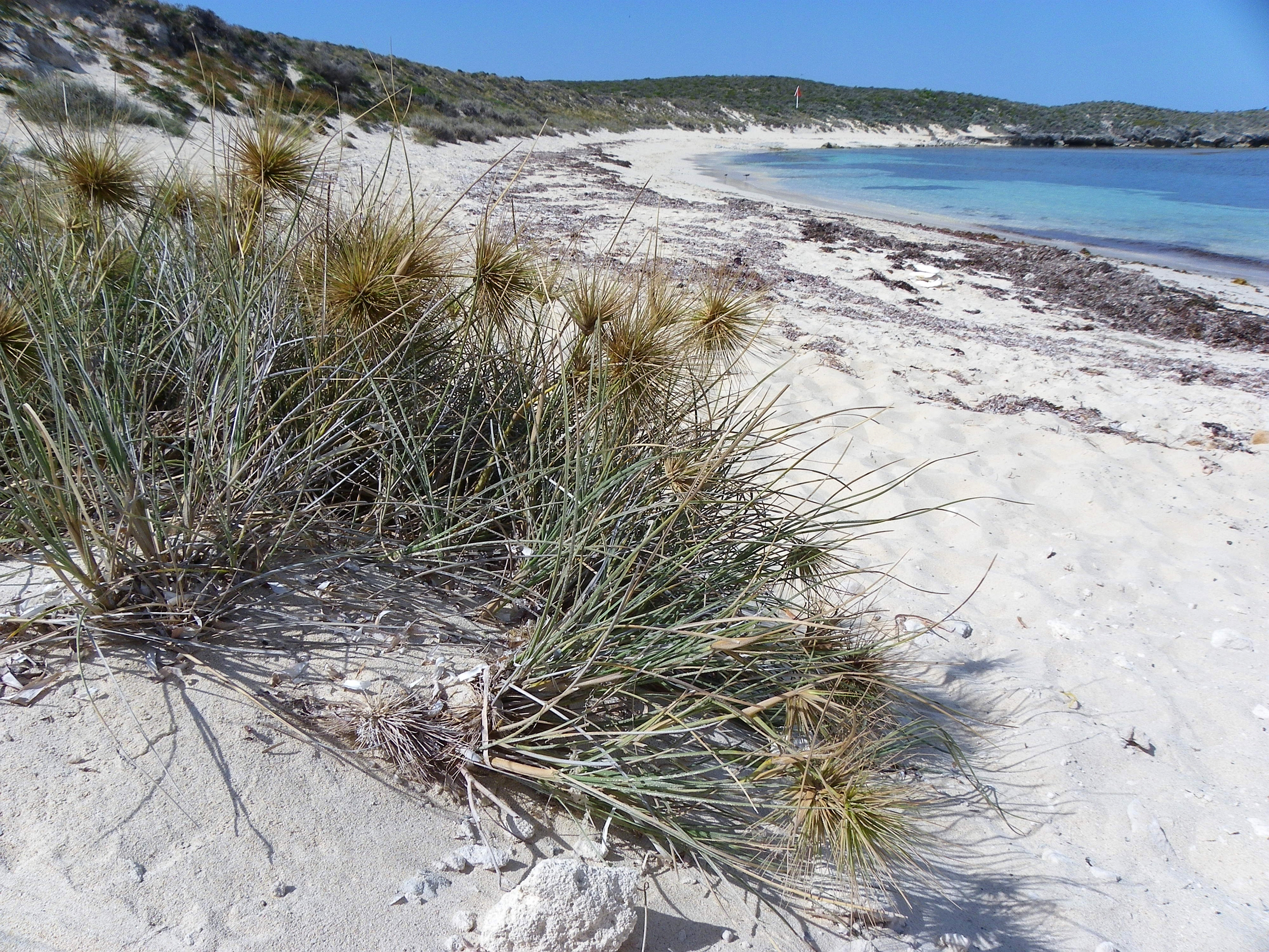
Spinifex longifolius growing on a Rottnest beach

The island has three native woodland tree species: the Rottnest Island pine (Callitris preissii), the Rottnest Island teatree (Melaleuca lanceolata), and Acacia rostellifera. The Rottnest Island daisy (Trachymene coerulea) is a commonly occurring flowering native that is also grown widely as an ornamental garden plant. Coastal dune flora include searocket (Cakile), beach spinifex (Spinifex longifolius) and wild rosemary (Olearia axillaris).

A Pinus radiata plantation was established by internees during World War I, roughly bordering the main settlement, The Basin and Bathurst. Plantation remnants can be seen around the golf course.

Rottnest was often described as heavily wooded by early explorers. Nearly 200 years of farmland clearing, firewood collection and bushfires have denuded much of the 19 square kilometres (7.3 sq mi) of large trees, and a fragile and fresh water-scarce environment has limited natural recovery. A conservation program including reforestation is ongoing. An island-based nursery propagates plants with island provenance used in the reforestation program and in remediating uncontrolled beach access.

== Climate ==
Rottnest Island has a Mediterranean climate (Köppen climate classification Csa) with warm, dry summers and mild, wet winters. Although the summers get little rain, they are humid.

Climate data for Rottnest Island
Month	Jan	Feb	Mar	Apr	May	Jun	Jul	Aug	Sep	Oct	Nov	Dec	Year
Record high °C (°F)	41.9 (107.4)	41.5 (106.7)	40.8 (105.4)	35.2 (95.4)	29.2 (84.6)	24.9 (76.8)	23.4 (74.1)	28.3 (82.9)	32.8 (91.0)	36.4 (97.5)	38.4 (101.1)	42.5 (108.5)	42.5 (108.5)
Mean maximum °C (°F)	36.5 (97.7)	36.1 (97.0)	35.3 (95.5)	30.4 (86.7)	25.8 (78.4)	22.3 (72.1)	21.2 (70.2)	21.6 (70.9)	24.0 (75.2)	28.8 (83.8)	32.5 (90.5)	35.3 (95.5)	38.8 (101.8)
Mean daily maximum °C (°F)	26.7 (80.1)	27.3 (81.1)	26.1 (79.0)	23.8 (74.8)	21.2 (70.2)	18.8 (65.8)	17.9 (64.2)	18.0 (64.4)	18.9 (66.0)	20.6 (69.1)	23.1 (73.6)	25.3 (77.5)	22.3 (72.1)
Mean daily minimum °C (°F)	19.2 (66.6)	19.5 (67.1)	18.8 (65.8)	17.3 (63.1)	15.2 (59.4)	13.4 (56.1)	12.5 (54.5)	12.4 (54.3)	13.0 (55.4)	14.1 (57.4)	15.9 (60.6)	17.8 (64.0)	15.8 (60.4)
Mean minimum °C (°F)	15.1 (59.2)	15.3 (59.5)	14.2 (57.6)	13.1 (55.6)	11.1 (52.0)	9.9 (49.8)	8.8 (47.8)	8.7 (47.7)	8.8 (47.8)	10.0 (50.0)	11.5 (52.7)	13.4 (56.1)	7.8 (46.0)
Record low °C (°F)	11.3 (52.3)	10.9 (51.6)	9.5 (49.1)	10.3 (50.5)	8.8 (47.8)	7.0 (44.6)	6.6 (43.9)	6.2 (43.2)	6.7 (44.1)	7.2 (45.0)	6.6 (43.9)	10.8 (51.4)	6.2 (43.2)
Average rainfall mm (inches)	13.7 (0.54)	10.3 (0.41)	18.4 (0.72)	32.6 (1.28)	70.2 (2.76)	102.0 (4.02)	111.9 (4.41)	85.2 (3.35)	51.0 (2.01)	27.2 (1.07)	18.7 (0.74)	9.7 (0.38)	553.4 (21.79)
Average precipitation days	2.2	1.9	3.9	7.6	11.3	15.3	18.3	17.1	13.1	8.6	5.4	3.3	108.0
Average afternoon relative humidity (%) (at 15:00)	63	61	60	61	60	63	64	64	64	63	63	61	62
Source: Bureau of Meteorology; Temperatures and rain data: 1983–2020; Relative humidity: 1991–2010

== Tourism and facilities ==
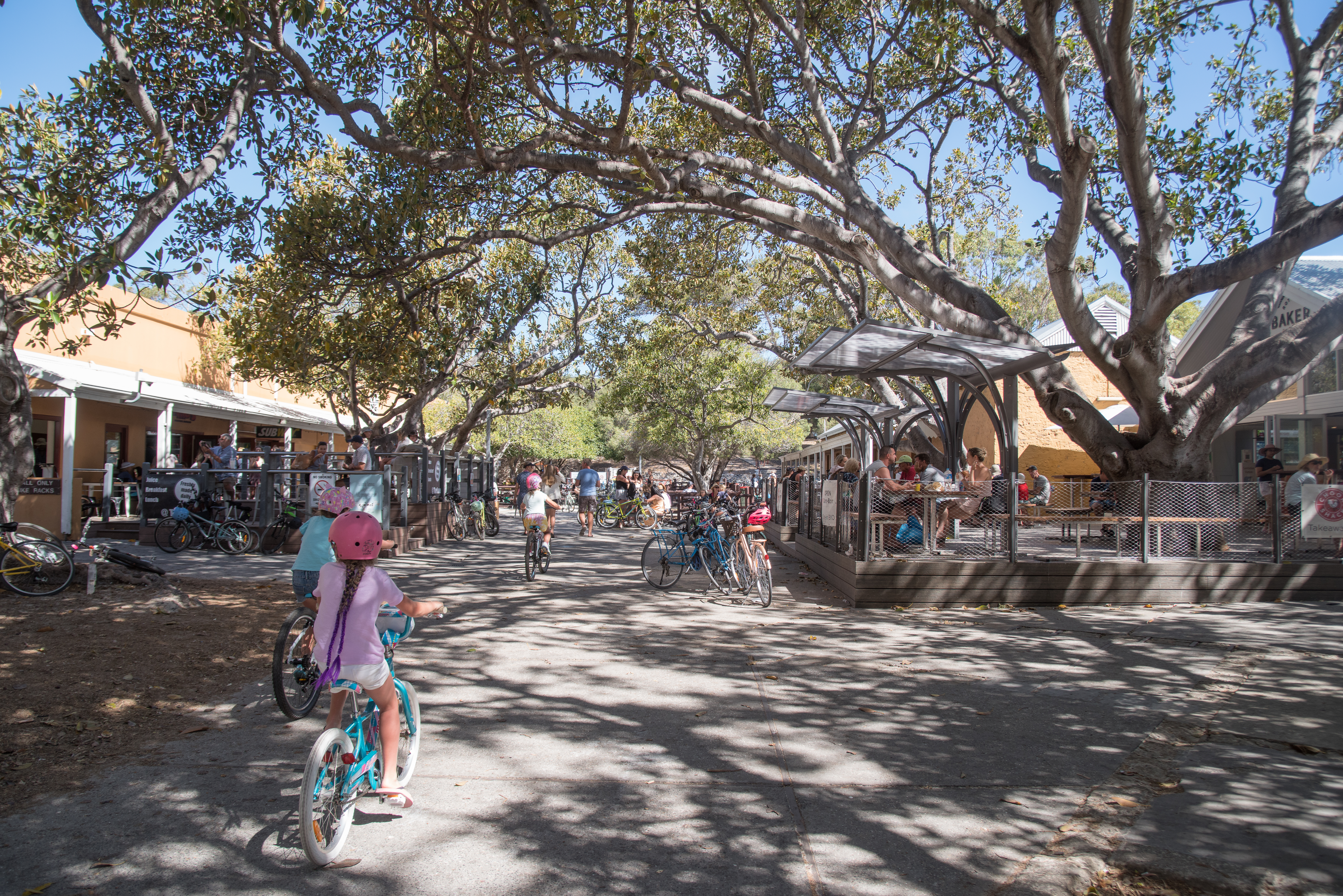
The main shopping area at Thomson Bay

The island became largely devoted to recreational use from the 1900s, aside from a brief period of exclusive military use during World War II. It is now visited annually by 450,000 to 500,000 visitors, an average of 330,000 of those arriving by ferry or air taxi. Seventy per cent of all visitors come for the day only. The majority of visitors arrive in summer, with nearly 20% of all visitors coming in January.

The only motor vehicles permitted on the island are emergency and service vehicles, although there is also a bus service. Cycling is the transport of choice for most visitors, with many either bringing a bicycle with them or hiring one at the island's facility.

The main settlement is located at Thomson Bay, which is a protected north-easterly bay facing the mainland. Other settlements are located at Geordie Bay and Longreach Bay on the northern side of the island. All are sheltered bays and well suited for boating and swimming. Many other bays around the island have permanent boat moorings which can be leased from the Rottnest Island Authority.

The island has accommodation for up to 5,500 visitors, while day-only visitors can number up to 20,000 at any one time. Rottnest Island Authority accommodation options include 291 villas, units and cottages which sleep four, six or eight people and which are self-catering. This style of accommodation is reasonably basic. Demand for accommodation is very high during the summer months. Ballots are no longer held and guests can book up to 18 months in advance.

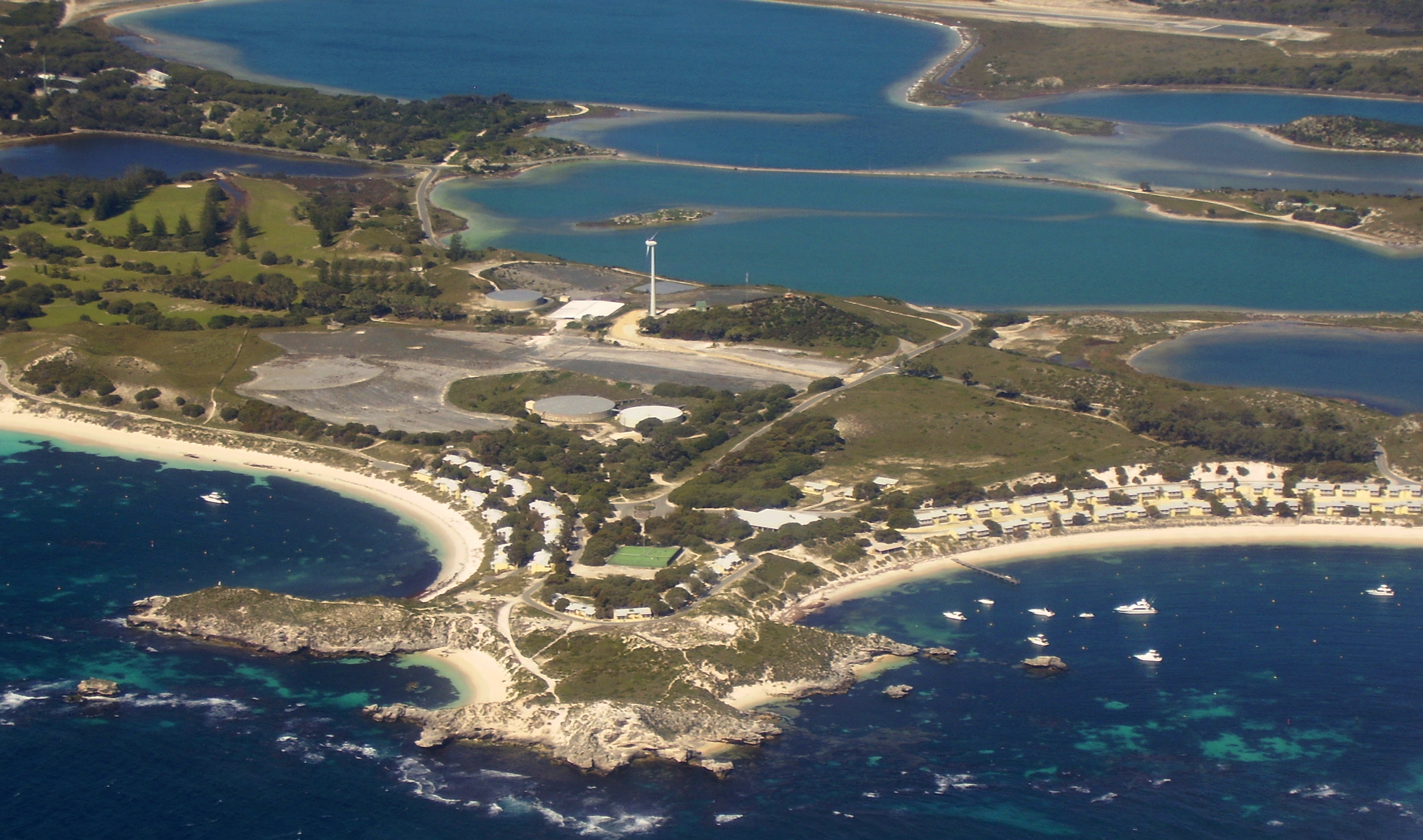
Rottnest's secondary settlement was constructed during the 1970s at Longreach (left) and Geordie Bays.

Other accommodation options include the below.

- Group accommodation at Kingstown Barracks.
- The Hotel Rottnest, formerly called the Quokka Arms Hotel and prior to that the Governor's residence.
- The Rottnest Lodge.
- Cabins at Caroline Thomson provide an alternative to camping and are popular with families, sleeping up to six with self-contained cooking and washing facilities.

Most visitors arrive on one of the ferries from Fremantle, Perth and Hillarys. These are operated by Rottnest Express, Rottnest Fast Ferries and SeaLink. Rottnest Island Airport for light aircraft is located near the main settlement.

The island was previously popular with Year 12 school leavers celebrating the end of their exams each November—known in Western Australia as "leavers week" or just "leavers"—RIA accommodation on the island was reserved for leavers during this time. Identification and proof of being a current secondary school leaver was required to book accommodation during this period. A decrease in attendance over this period of time has led to leavers week no longer occurring on Rottnest.

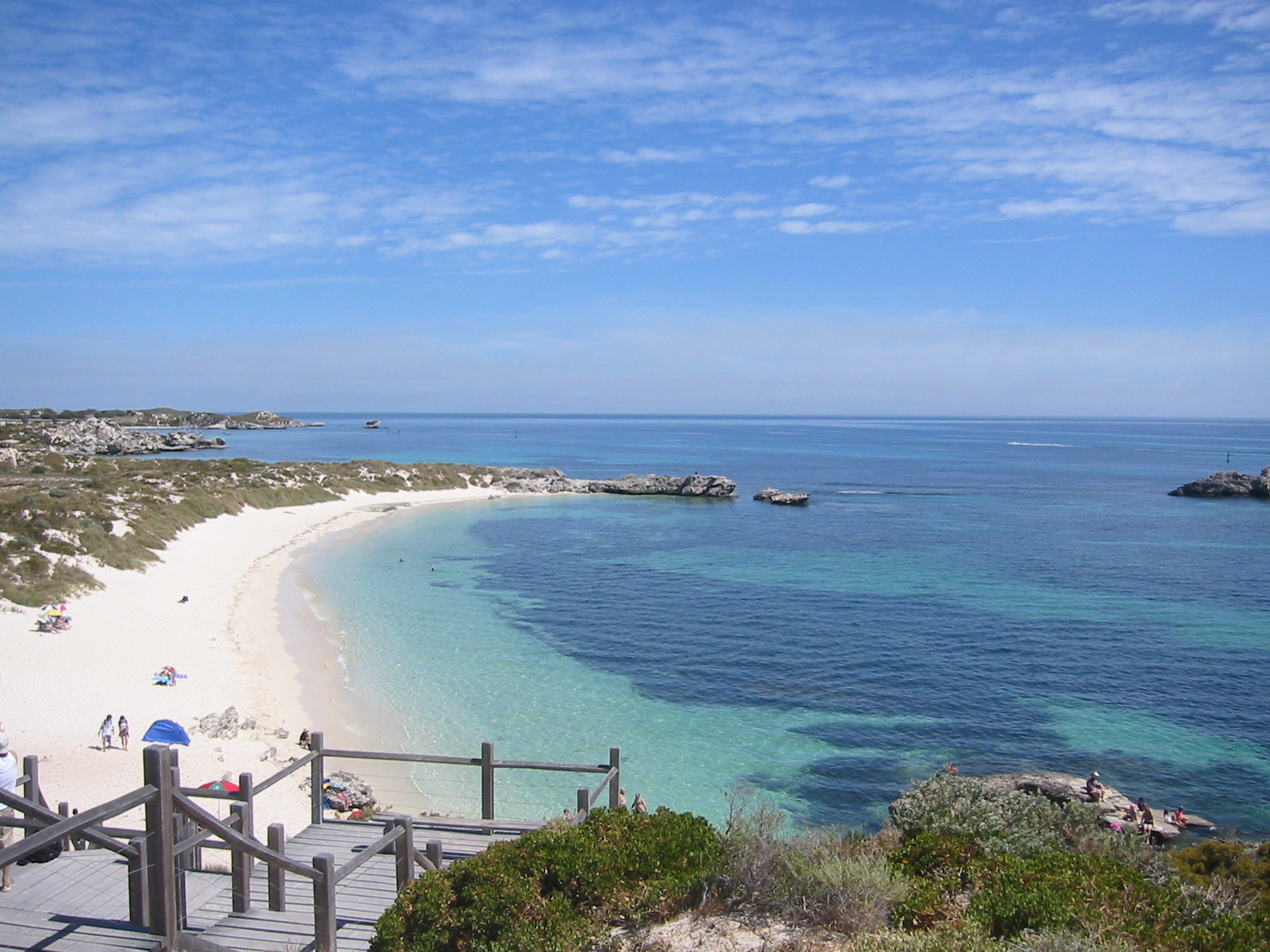
Pinky's beach, near Bathurst Lighthouse

Catering facilities in the Thomson Bay foreshore area include a Dôme coffee shop, Thomsons Restaurant; Quokka Joes; Rottnest Lodge and the Hotel Rottnest. The main settlement has a general store, including a liquor outlet, a bakery, cafe/coffee shop, Subway restaurant and clothing store. The Red Rooster store closed in 2011. The Lodge includes several restaurants and bars also. Geordie Bay also has a general store, liquor outlet and Geordie Cafe.

A luxury hotel was planned for the island but negotiations with preferred proponents ceased. The Authority stated that "The development of a new hotel at Mount Herschel remains a priority."

The island was the site of an important Australian High Court case, Nagle v Rottnest Island Authority, which arose after a man dived off a rock on Rottnest Island and became a quadriplegic. It was held that, as the island authority had promoted the site as a venue for swimming and had not put up a warning notice, it was liable for causing the injury.

=== Activities ===
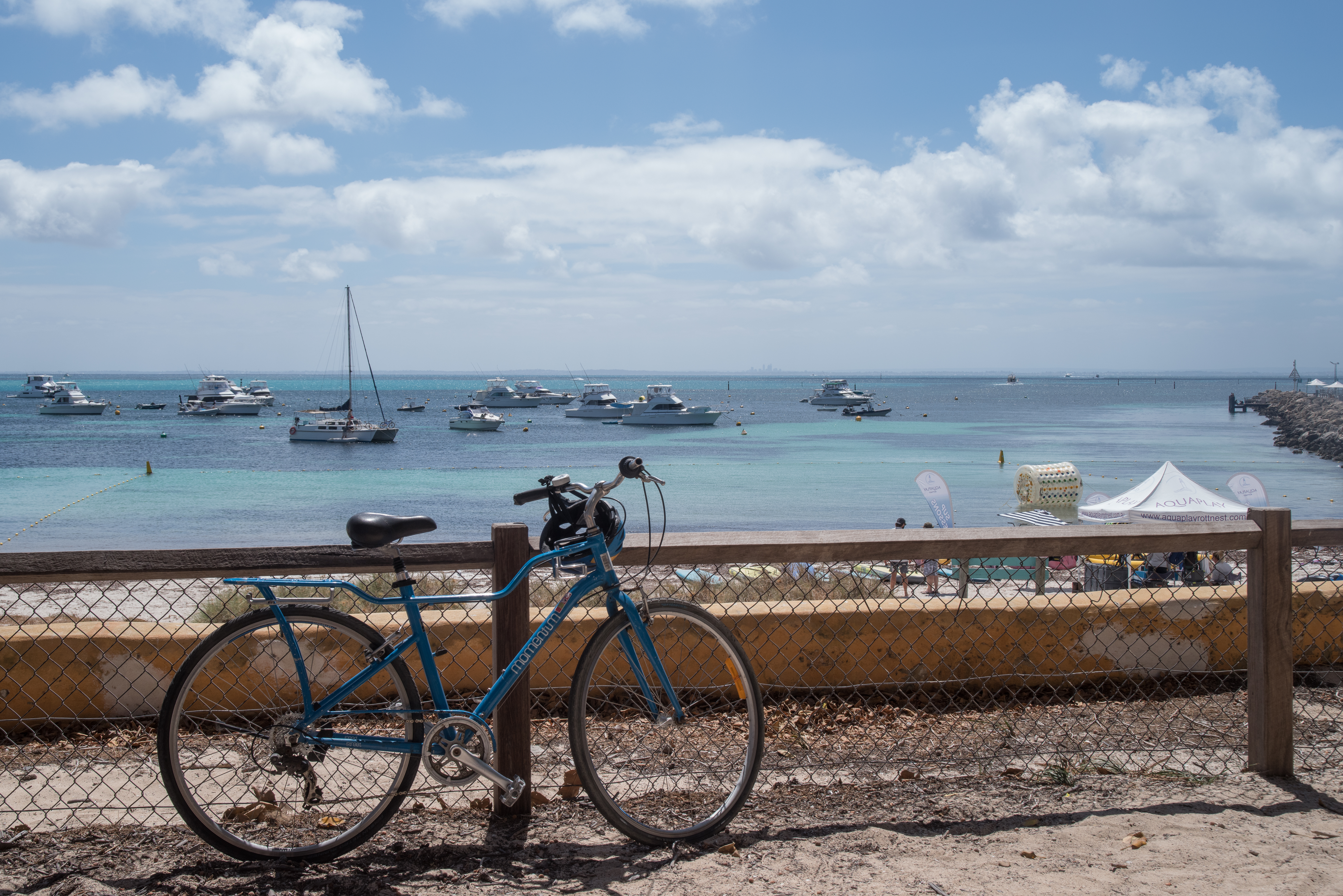
Bicycles are a primary form of transport on Rottnest.

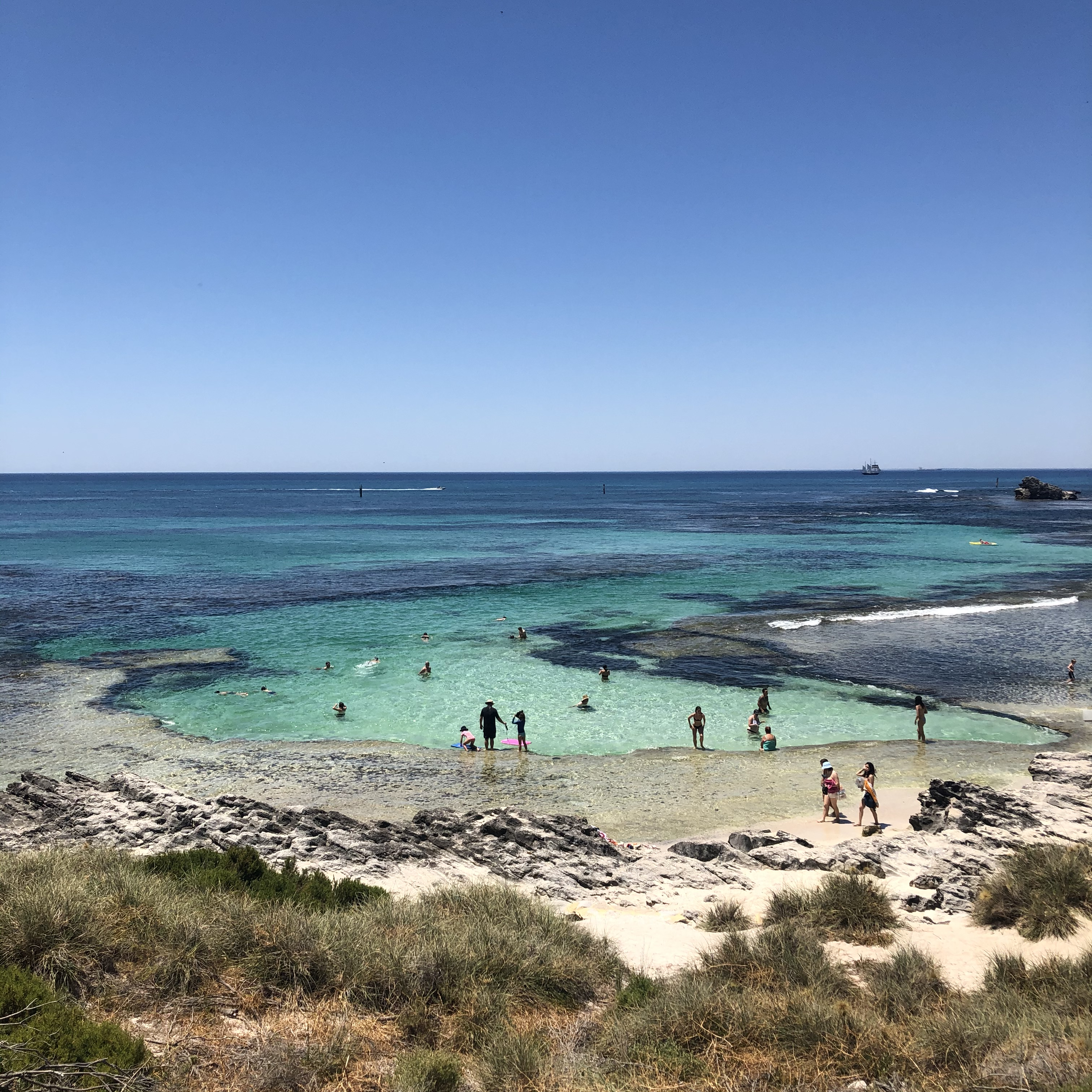
Swimmers at The Basin.

Diving is a popular activity at Rottnest. Its varied limestone reef terrain and plentiful fish make it an interesting diving destination. In particular, diving for crayfish and Western rock lobster is popular in the summer months. The season opens on 15 November each year and runs until 30 June. Crayfish may be caught in special traps or "pots", or when diving either by hand or by using a crayfish "loop". The loop is a spring-loaded steel cable attached to a long pole. It is illegal to use any means that might puncture the shell to catch the crayfish. The bag limit is 6 per licence per day, with a maximum of 12 per boat per day.

A snorkel trail at Parker Point features underwater interpretative plaques that give information about the marine environments surrounding Rottnest. The island is the southernmost point along the Western Australian coastline at which coral grows. The Rottnest Island Wreck Trail was developed in conjunction with the Western Australian Museum in 1980 as the first underwater interpretative trail in the southern hemisphere. Visits to some of the Rottnest Island shipwrecks, in essence a museum-without-walls can be made by glass-bottomed boat, or by scuba and snorkel. The SS Macedon site is one of the most visited wrecks in Australia.

The island's historic buildings and beaches are all reachable by cycling tracks. Cycling is the island's primary mode of transport. Private or hire cars are not allowed on the island.

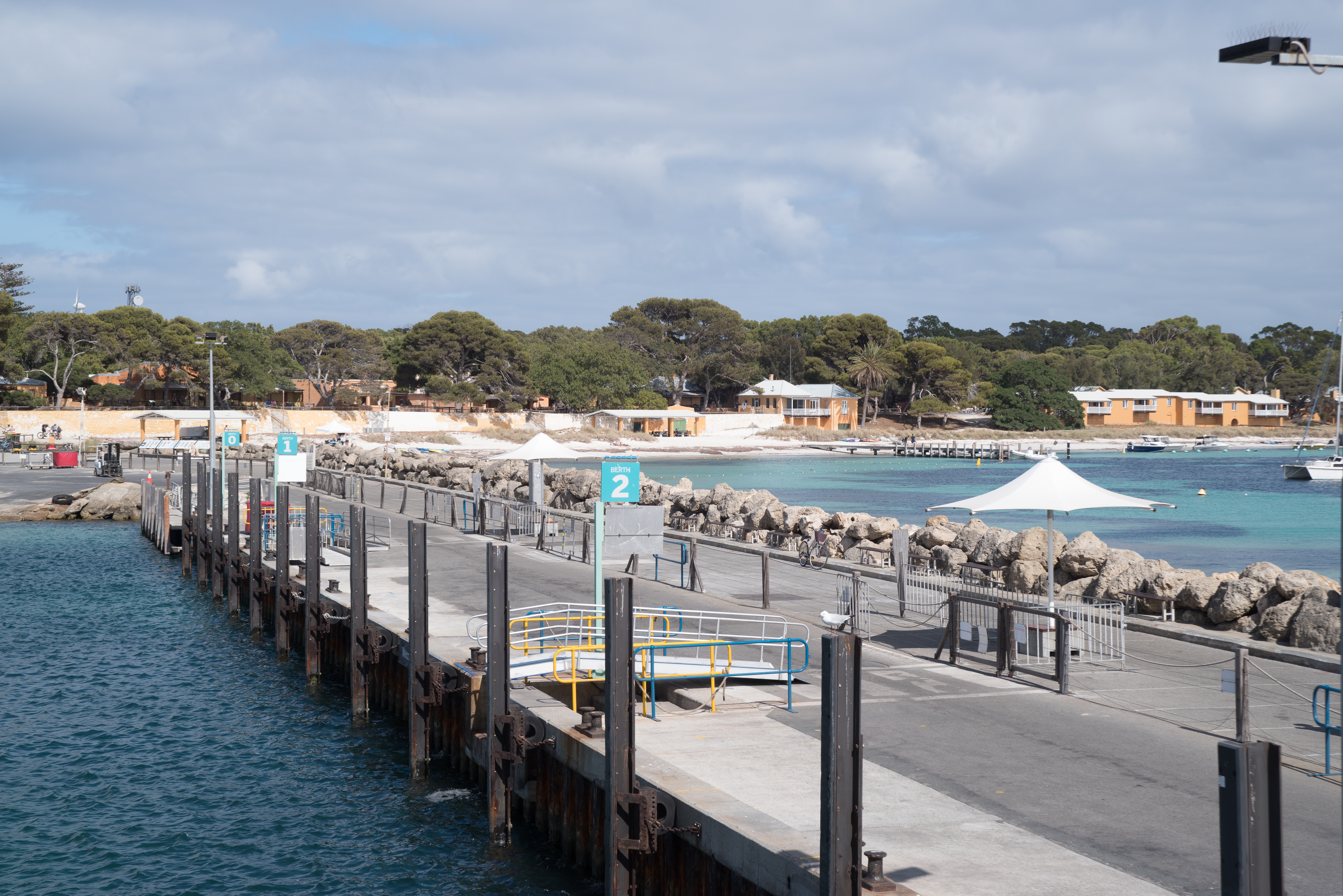
The island's main settlement is located at Thomson Bay.

=== Annual events ===
- The Rottnest Channel Swim is a long-distance swimming event from Cottesloe Beach to Rottnest Island held each February.
- The Rottnest Marathon & Fun Run is an annual running event operated late each October by the West Australian Marathon Club. Event distances are 5 km (3.1 mi), 10 km (6.2 mi) and the marathon distance 42.2 kilometres (26.2 mi).
- "Rottofest" is a popular comedy, film and music festival held annually in September.
- Leavers week (November), when high-school graduates visit Rottnest to celebrate the end of their final exams. Although in recent times 'leavers' no longer occurs due to major falls in popularity.
- "Swim Thru Rottnest" is an annual 1,600-metre swim held on the first Saturday in December. The event was first held in 1977. Competitors start on the east side of the Army Jetty in Thomson Bay, swim to the natural jetty and then return to the Army jetty. The event is run by the Cottesloe Crabs Winter Swimming Club.
- "The Doctor" is a 27 km (17 mi) surfski and paddle race from the Army jetty to Sorrento Beach. It is held each January.
- "Fremantle to Rottnest Big Splash" is a masters swimming race from Leighton Beach to Rottnest.

== Transport ==
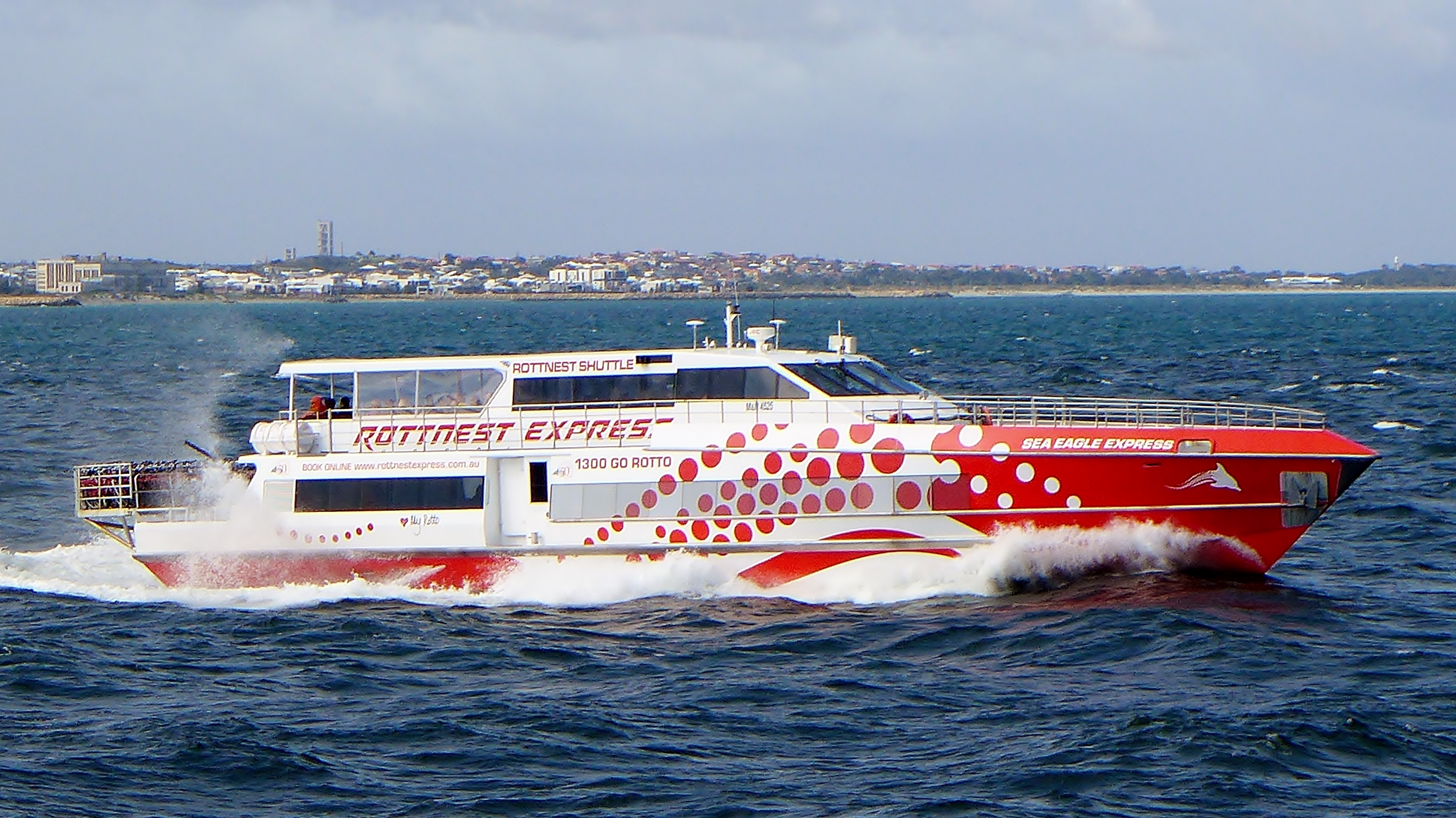
Rottnest Express' Sea Eagle Express departing from Fremantle

Rottnest Island is accessed by ferry services. Rottnest Express commenced operating in the 1950s, while SeaLink commenced in November 2017. Both operate services from Fremantle with a few from Barrack Street Jetty in the Perth central business district. Rottnest Fast Ferries operate services from Hillarys Boat Harbour.

From the early 1970s, bus services on the island were operated by the Rottnest Island Authority with ex Metropolitan Transport Trust buses including Bedford SB, Guy Arabs, Albion Vikings, Leyland Tiger Cubs, Hino RC520Ps, Mercedes-Benz O305s and Renault PR100s.

In November 2015, Adams Coachlines commenced a contract to operate all bus services. The service operates under the Quokka Coaches brand.

Helicopter and light plane flights are also available.

Private cars are not allowed on the island; the most common private transport is by bicycle or walking.

=== Oliver Hill Railway ===
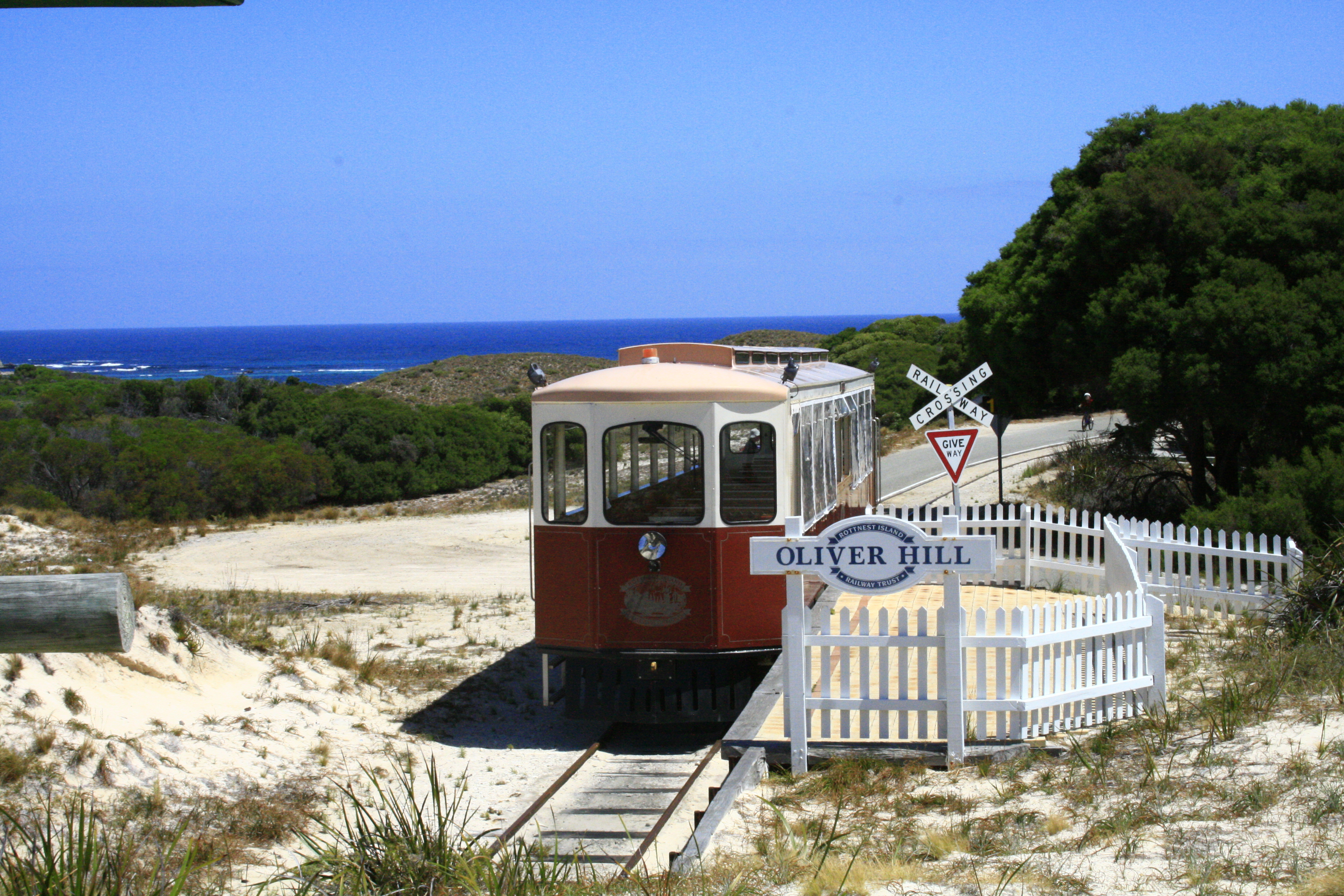
Oliver Hill railway station in 2011 with the railcar Captain Hussey

In 1935 construction commenced on a nine kilometre military railway to service two 9.2-inch guns at Oliver Hill and two six inch guns at Bickley. It had fallen out of use by the 1950s.

In 1966 the Rottnest Island Board of Control purchased the line with a petrol locomotive and eight wagons from the Australian Army with the aim of reopening it as a scenic railway. However it wasn't until 1993 that work began to restore 6.5 kilometres of the line. The Oliver Hill Railway was officially opened by Premier of Western Australia Richard Court on 3 July 1994.

== Services ==
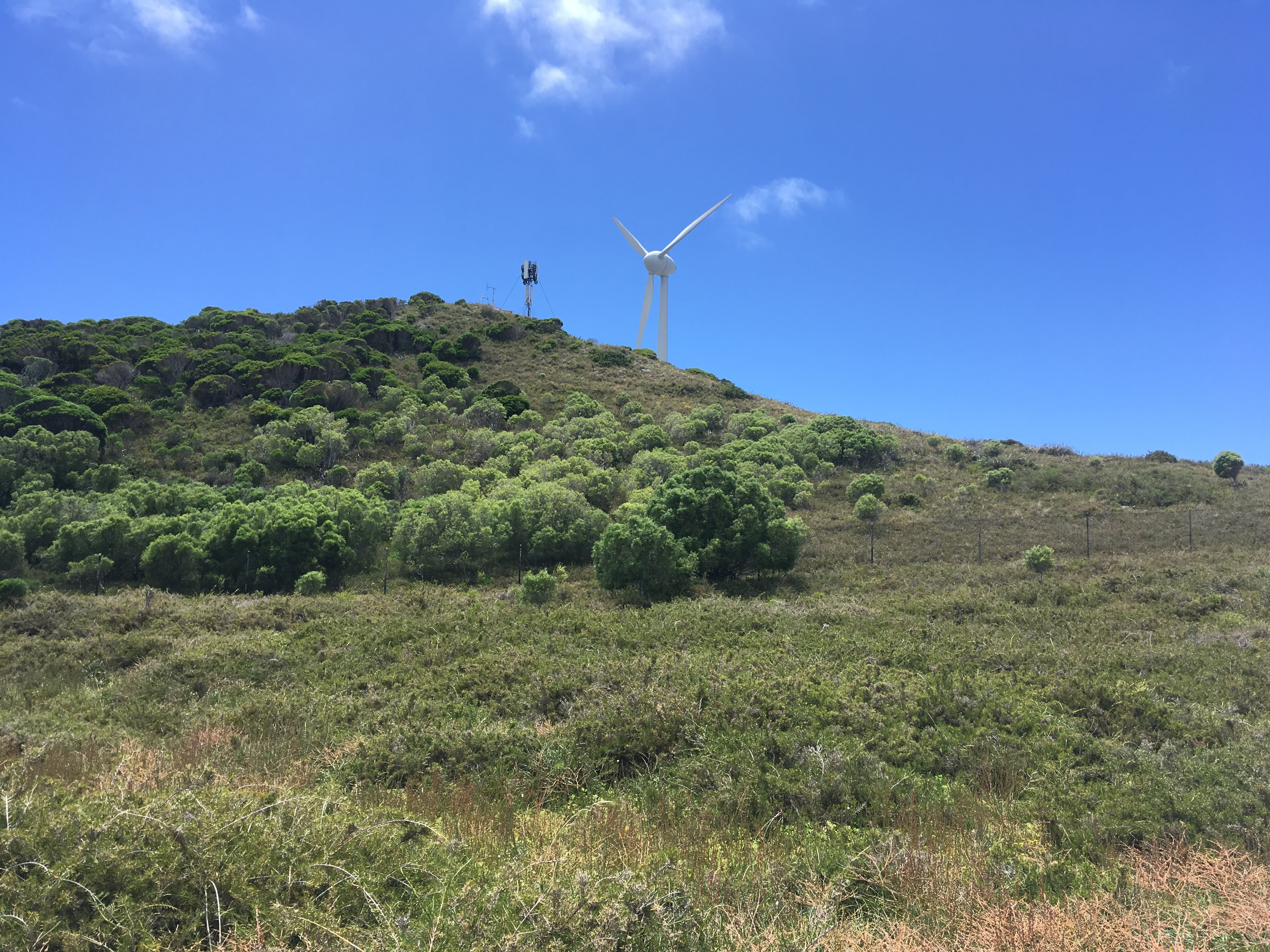
The wind turbine on Rottnest Island

Rottnest Island has few permanent residents, with most island workers commuting from the mainland.

As Rottnest is isolated from the mainland, and has no fresh surface water, providing water, power and waste disposal has always been difficult and expensive. In 1996, Rottnest introduced the first public-place recycling program in Western Australia. In 2000, the island won the 3R awards (reduce, reuse and recycle). A daily supply barge (the Spinifex) makes a return trip from Fremantle, delivering supplies and removing rubbish.

For many years during the twentieth century, the water supply was rainwater harvested from several large bitumen-sealed catchment areas behind Longreach Bay. In the 1970s, fresh water was found underground and was used to supplement the rainfall supply. In 1995, the supply was further supplemented with desalinated groundwater, using a reverse osmosis plant producing up to 500 kL (130,000 US gal) per day.

Experimental wind turbines were commissioned in 1978; however, high maintenance requirements and excessive power generation resulted in diesel fuel remaining the main power source. In 2004, a new Enercon 600 kW (800 hp) wind turbine was erected; other works at the time included upgrades to the power station and the installation of low load diesel generators in a wind-diesel system. The wind turbine delivers approximately 37% of Rottnest's power requirements and saves over 400,000 L (110,000 US gal) of diesel fuel per year. 500 kW of solar panels were added in 2017.

Two fully automated lighthouses operate on the island to aid passing maritime traffic: Bathurst Lighthouse and Wadjemup Lighthouse. An extensive network of flashing markers and transit beacons indicate safe passages through the rocky entrances to bays.

== Volunteer groups working on Rottnest ==
Volunteering has been a part of the culture on Rottnest Island since the Winnit Club began working there in the summer of 1930–1931. Other volunteer organisations have included the Rottnest Island Foundation, the Rottnest Society, and the Rottnest Voluntary Guides Association. Tasks vary, including guided tours, tree planting, litter collection, and the building of access boardwalks and stairs.

The RIA employs a full-time volunteer coordinator. Rottnest Island Volunteer Fire and Rescue Services, this brigade is a "private brigade" where the RIA funds critical funding to allow the brigade to function. The brigade is trained to be first response to any emergency on the island, assisted by agencies on and off the island. Most of the members are working residents in volunteering roles.

== Popular culture ==
- A 1912 film, Trip to Rottnest, made by the Australian Government to popularise Rottnest as a holiday destination, is thought to be one of the first of its kind.
- Rottnest was visited by contestants during The Amazing Race 9 and The Amazing Race Australia 6.

== See also ==
- Rottnest ship graveyard

== Sources ==
- Dortch, Joe; Dortch, Charles (2012). "Archaeological evidence for early human presence in the western reaches of the Greater Swan Region, Western Australia". Fremantle Studies. 7: 51–76.
- Dortch, Joe; Dortch, Charles (2019). "Late Quaternary Aboriginal hunter-gatherer occupation of the Greater Swan Region, south-western Australia". Australian Archaeology. 85: 15–29. doi:10.1080/03122417.2019.1594556.
- Heeres, Jan Ernst (1899). The Part Borne by the Dutch in the Discovery of Australia 1606-1765 (in Dutch and English). Leiden, London: Brill Publishers. hdl:2027/njp.32101073851337. LCCN 05012045. OCLC 13214159. OL 52349613M. Wikidata Q133908667.
- McGlade, Hannah (30 May 2018). "Rottnest Island 'tent land' closure an important day for Aboriginal people". Australian Broadcasting Corporation.
- Nannup, Noel (2026). "Nyoongar Stories Speak of Time When People Could Walk Out to Place Across Water Where Spirits Are". ABC. Deep Time. "Nyoongar stories have been passed down about the time when people used to walk out to Wadjemup which means 'place across the water where the spirits are', also known today as Rottnest Island."
- Playford, Phillip (2004). "Geology and Hydrogeology of Rottnest Island, Western Australia". Developments in Sedimentology. 54. Elsevier: 783–810. doi:10.1016/s0070-4571(04)80049-9. ISBN 978-0-444-51644-2.
- "Rottnest Pilot Service". The West Australian. Perth. 2 April 1903. p. 7 – via Trove.
