= The Basin (Rottnest Island) =

Bay on Rottnest Island, Western Australia

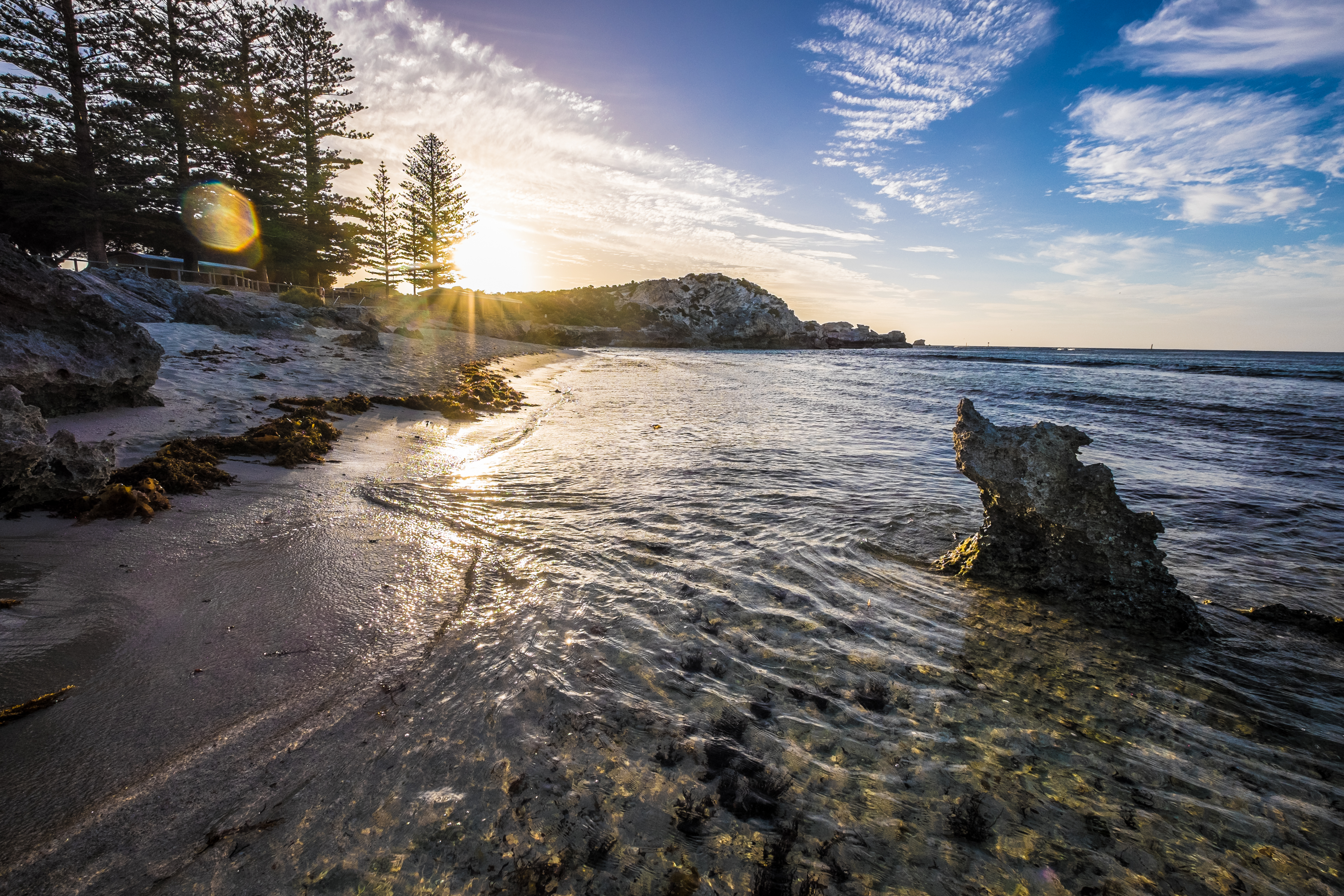
- The Basin during golden hour

- Location within Perth
- Interactive map of The Basin
- Location: Rottnest Island, Western Australia
- Coordinates: 31.9886°S 115.536°E
- Type: Bay
- Ocean/sea sources: Indian Ocean
- Max. length: 90 m (300 ft)
- Max. width: 350 m (1,150 ft)
- Surface area: 2.3 ha (5.7 acres)
- Shore length^{1}: 468 m (1,535 ft)
- ^{1} Shore length is not a well-defined measure.

The Basin is a popular ocean swimming location at the northeast of Rottnest Island, between Pinky Beach and Longreach Bay in Western Australia.

John T. McMahon (1893–1989) once wrote of it:

I challenge the world to produce a better swimming place than the Basin. Nature has been eloquent here. Two jagged headlines guard the cove whose slopes are covered with white sand. Climb up the hill that separates us from Longreach Bay, and look down upon the unbelievable shades of green water in the Basin, curving around the reefs to meander in and out until it reaches a sandy beach, a delightful swim, an objective for the before-breakfast plunge...

The Basin offers safe bathing for the diffident, and the excitement of swimming in deep water for the few who round the bends of the reefs and face the open great pools further out. Sharks cannot enter, so that the only monsters to fear are the blue-bottles. The water feels as if the seas' best vintage was filtered through miles of reefs. Other bays offer bathing, fine surfing at Bickley Bay, at Salmon Bay, and Longreach is always inviting, but back to the Basin one comes, and having enjoyed the walk to more distant beaches, one becomes satisfied at last with the best, which is the Basin.

— John T. McMahon, 1976

== Gallery ==
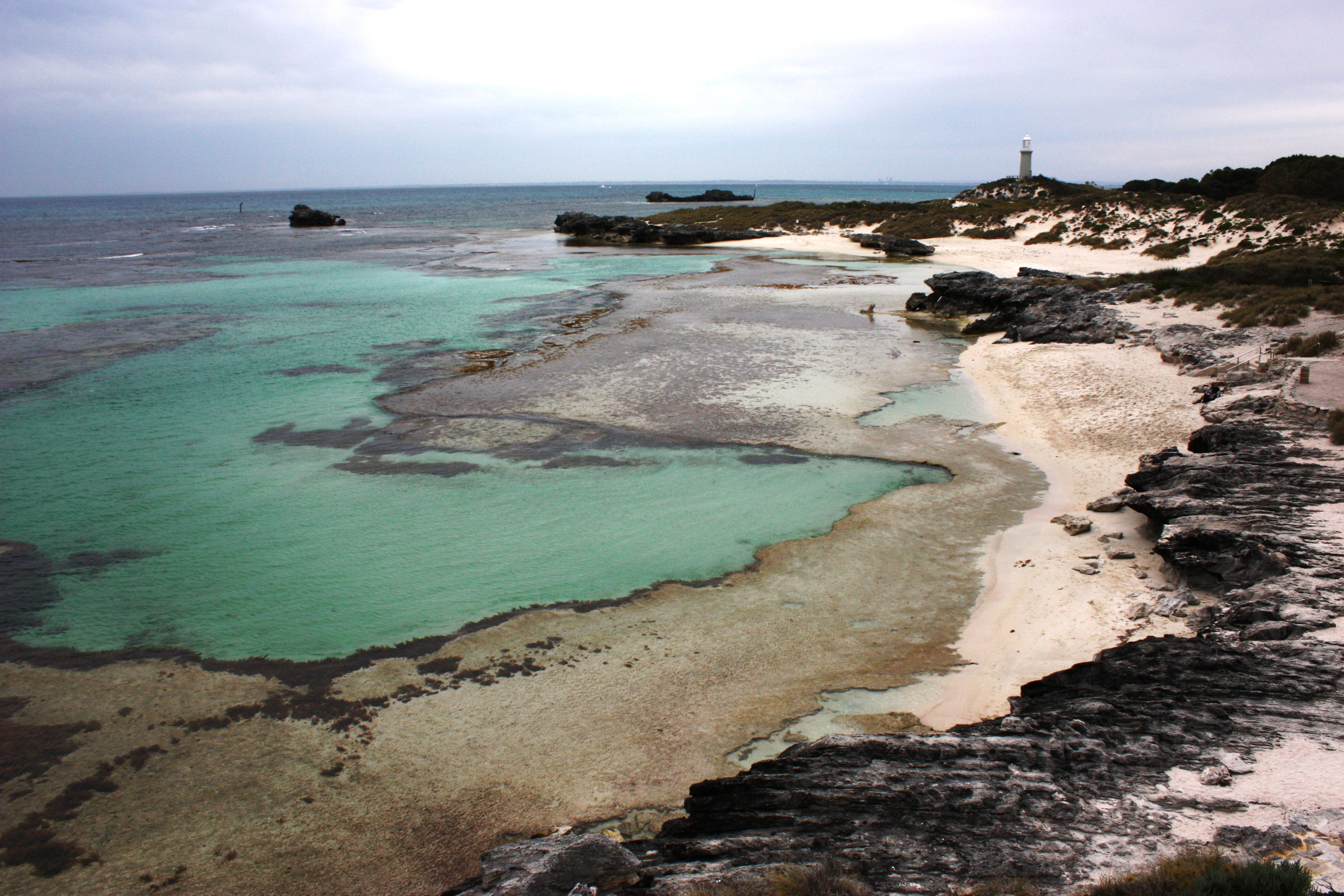
View of the Basin, from atop the limestone outcrop at its western end

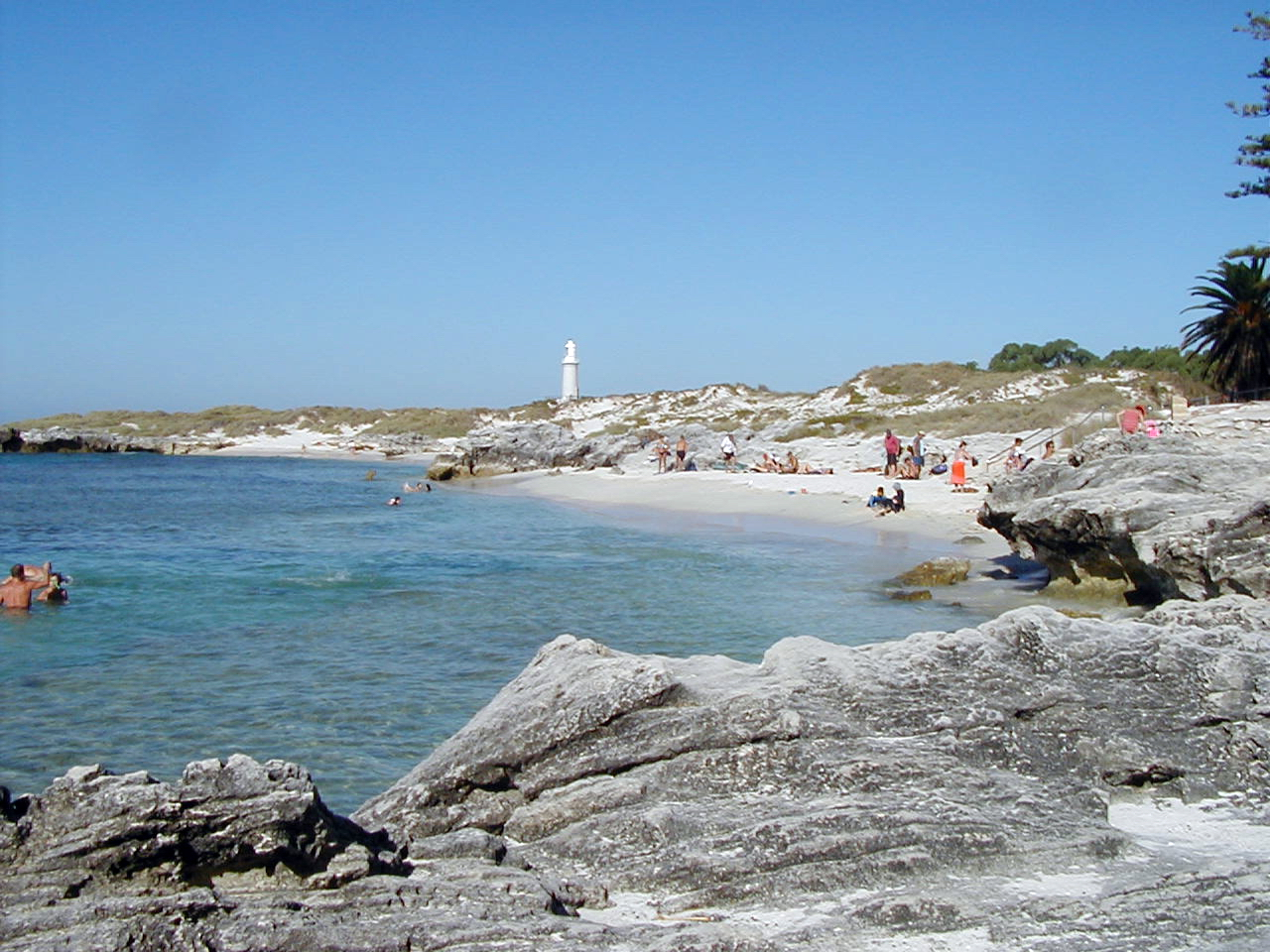
Swimmers in the middle part of the Basin

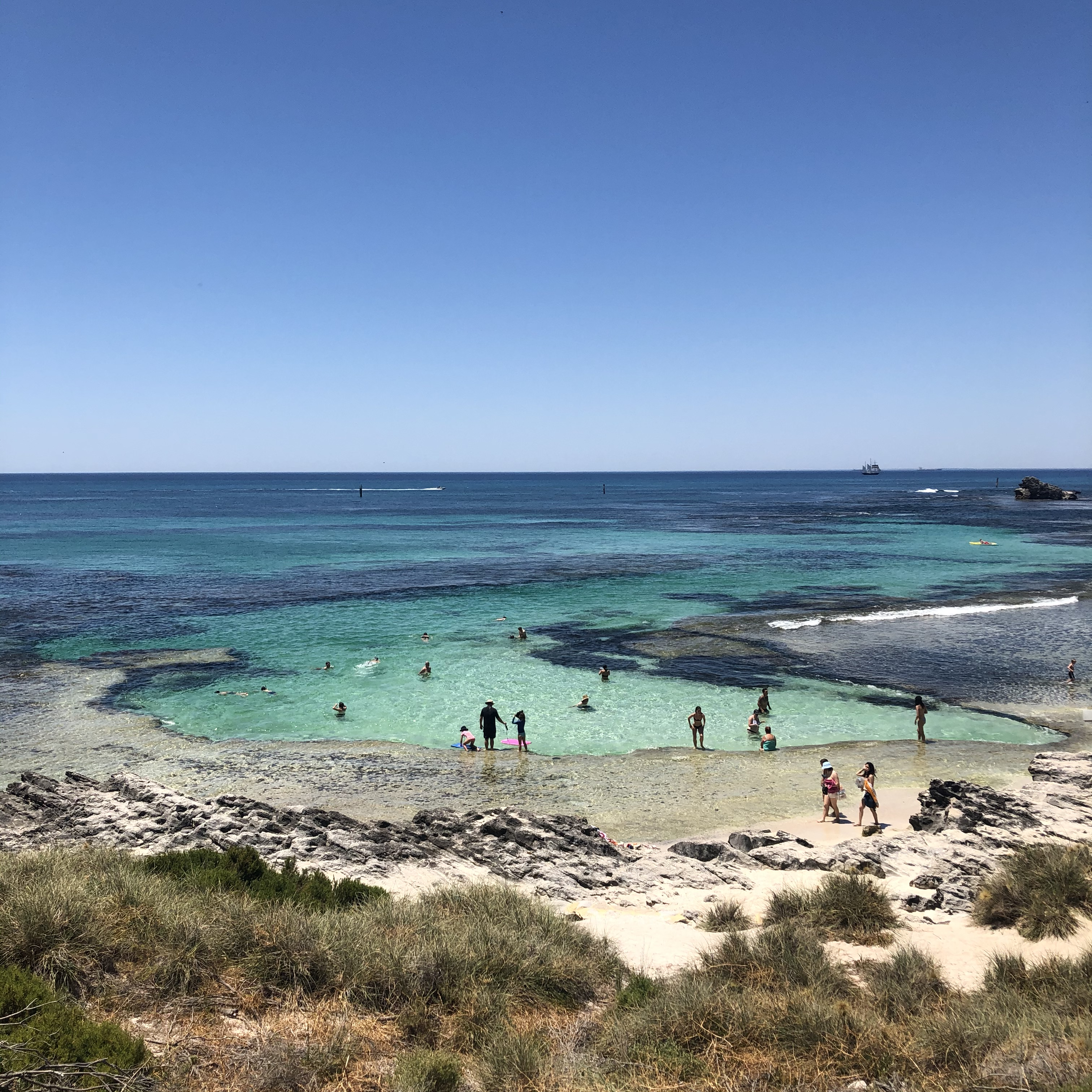
The Basin in 2019
