= Thomson Bay Settlement =

Thomson Bay
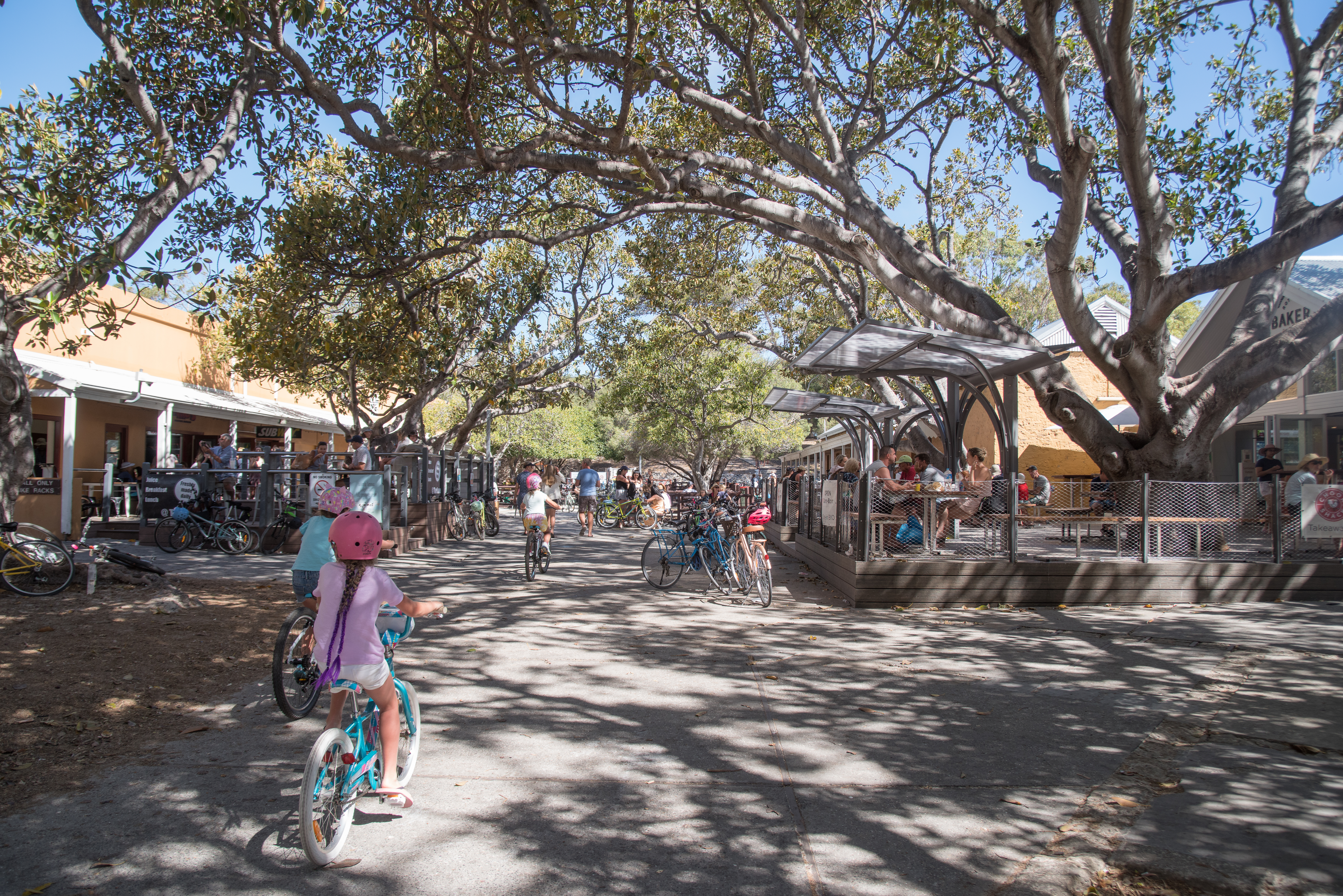
- An afternoon at the settlement during the COVID-19 pandemic

- Interactive map of Thomson Bay
- Coordinates: 31°59′45″S 115°32′26″E
- Country: Australia
- State: Western Australia
- LGA: City of Cockburn

Population
  - Total: 166 (2021)
- Time zone: UTC+8 (AWST)
- Postcode: 6161

Thomson Bay, known in full as Thomson Bay Settlement and also known as The Settlement, is the largest settlement of Rottnest Island, Western Australia, situated on the island's northeastern coast. It is home to most of Rottnest's stores, restaurants and nearly all of the island's population. It is a one-minute walk from the bay with the same name. As of the 2021 census, the settlement had a population of 166.

The settlement is opposite from Fremantle, and the city of Perth is visible from the beach.
