= Bathurst Lighthouse =

Lighthouse on Rottnest Island, Western Australia

Bathurst Lighthouse Bathurst Lighthouse
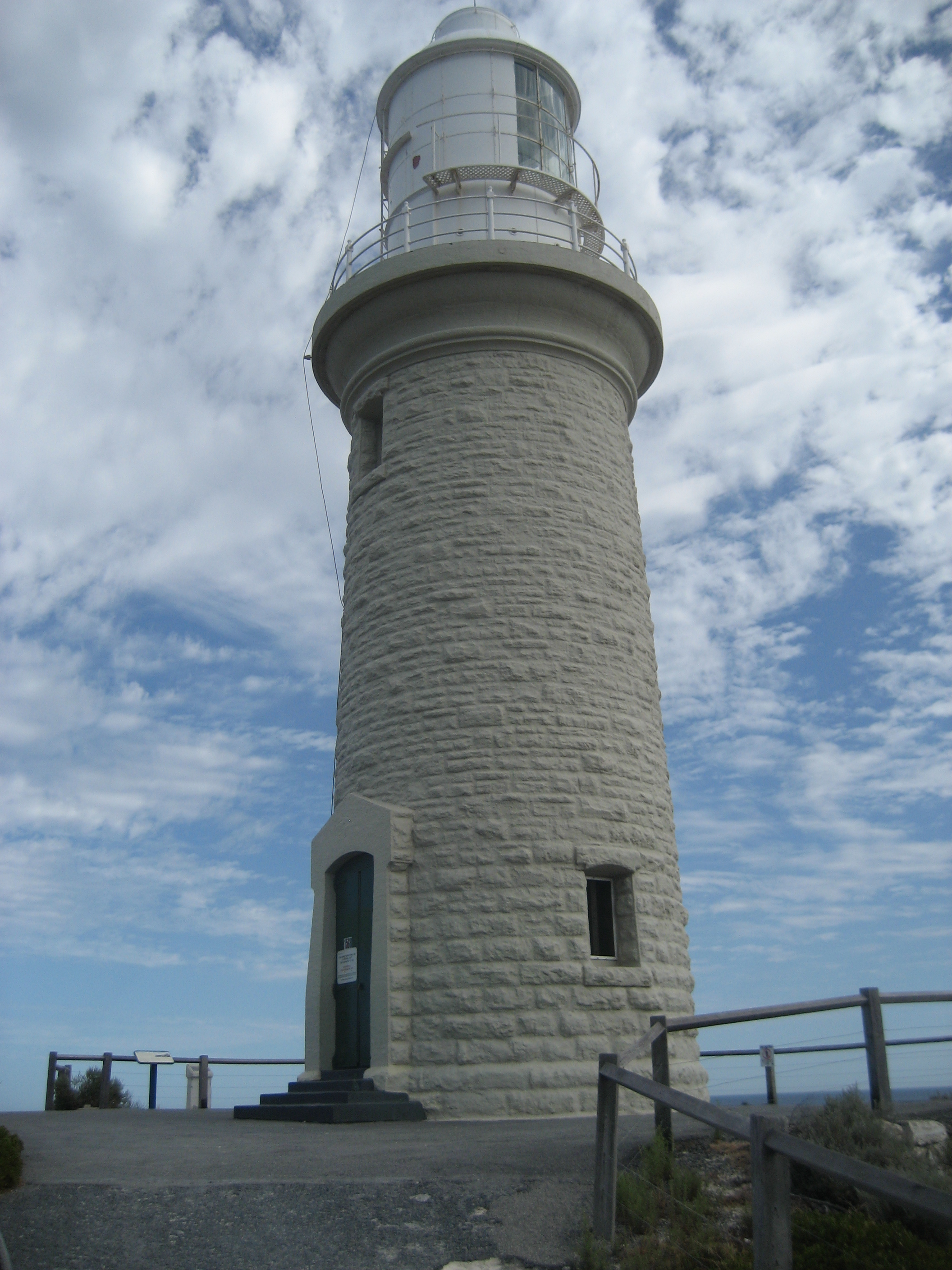
- Location: Rottnest Island, Bathurst Point, City of Cockburn, Australia
- Coordinates: 31°59′22″S 115°32′26″E

Tower
- Constructed: 1900
- Construction: limestone
- Automated: 1920
- Height: 19.2 m (63 ft)
- Shape: conical
- Markings: white (tower), white (lantern), gold (dome)
- Power source: mains electricity
- Operator: Australian Maritime Safety Authority

Light
- First lit: 1900
- Focal height: 30 m (98 ft)
- Intensity: 13,800 candela
- Range: 14 nmi (26 km; 16 mi)
- Characteristic: Fl(4) W 16s

Western Australia Heritage Register
- Designated: 4 May 2001
- Reference no.: 517

Bathurst Lighthouse is one of two lighthouses on Rottnest Island, the other being Wadjemup Lighthouse. It is located on Bathurst Point, in the northeast of the island, and was activated in 1900. The lighthouse was erected in response to a series of shipping disasters in the area, which included the loss of City of York in 1899.

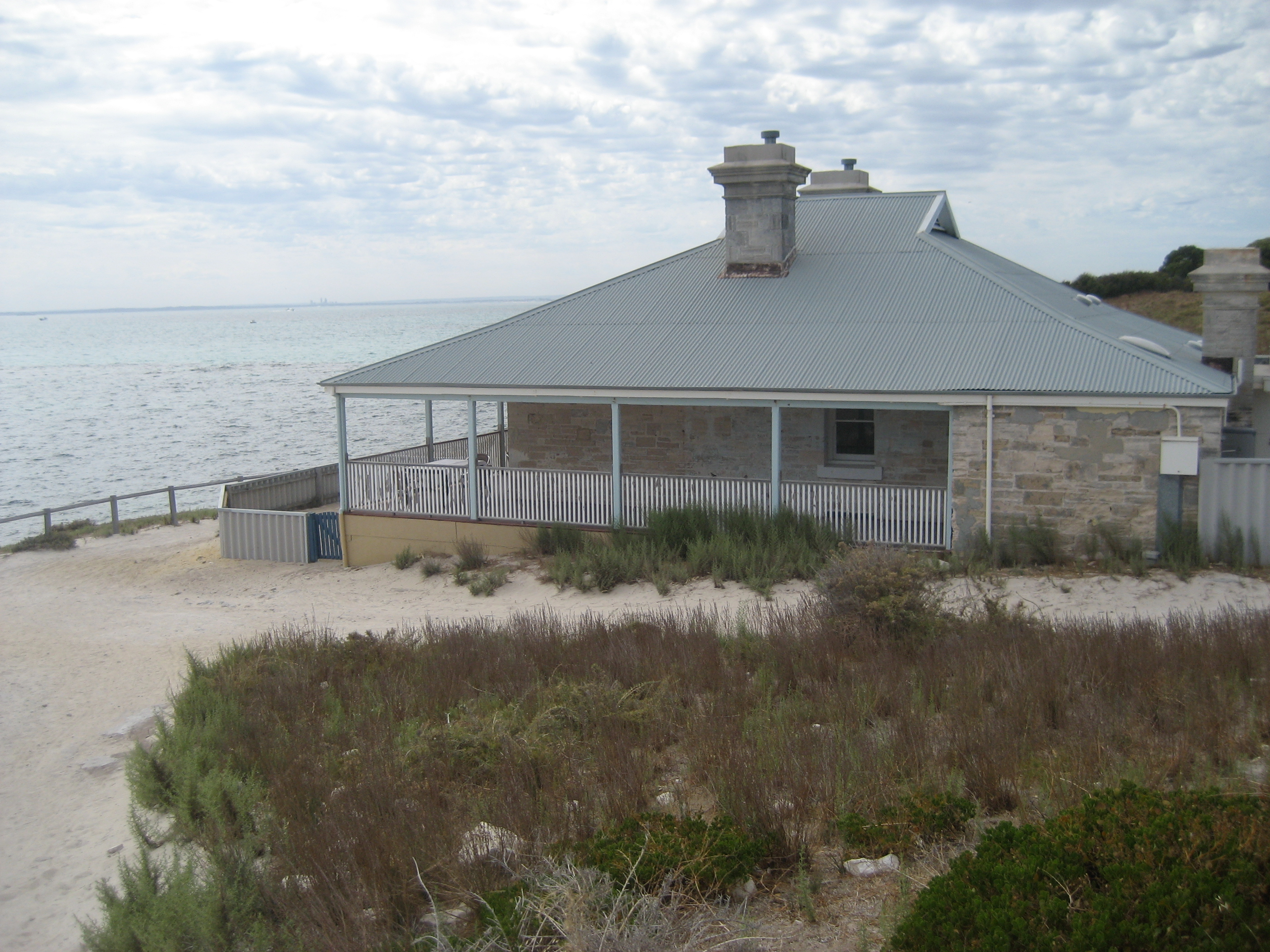
Former lighthouse keeper's residence

The light source and lantern house were originally to be used at Cape Leeuwin but were then built in on Rottnest Island. In 1920 the original acetylene flame was replaced by a flasher, which made the keeper superfluous. An electric light was installed in 1986.

Bathurst Lighthouse serves as the rear light in the pair of Kingston Reef's leading lights, which guide ships departing from Fremantle through the reefs near the island. Its light is characterised by a group of four flashes that occurs every sixteen seconds.

The original land allocation for the lighthouse and surrounds was reduced in size in 1934.

== See also ==
- List of lighthouses in Australia
