= Shipwrecks of Western Australia =

Over 1400 ships have been wrecked on the coast of Western Australia. This relatively large number of shipwrecks is due to a number of factors, including:

- a long and very difficult coastline with very few natural harbours;
- powerful storms and gales that are very common at certain times of the year (these winds are normally on-shore);
- a long cyclone season rendering all sea travel hazardous and many harbours ineffectual in providing a safe haven;
- the inability to accurately measure longitude until the late 18th century, and the tendency to reduce ships' travel time by keeping them in the "Roaring Forties" for as long as possible, which caused many ships to fail to turn north for the Indies at the right time.

== Listings ==
Most listings of the wrecks of Western Australia present them chronologically or group them into regions, areas or adjacent capes and coastal features, so as to divide the large number into manageable collections, thematic or regional studies. These groupings and individual data on each site can be seen in electronic databases and in a number of 'hard copy' works produced by a number of authors (e.g. the Australian Shipwrecks series, by Charles Bateson and then by Jack Loney appearing in both formats) and in focussing specifically on Western Australia, by the Department of Maritime Archaeology at the Western Australian Museum. Its CEO is charged with the responsibility of managing the wrecks lying offshore and in inland rivers and estuaries for both the State of Western Australia and the Commonwealth Government. A chronological listing of all known wrecks on the Western Australian coast, for example, appears in the three volume 'Unfinished Voyages' Series produced by Graeme Henderson with the assistance of other authors. Sarah Kenderdine produced an analysis of the historic wrecks of the Metropolitan coast. WA Museum volunteers and Honorary Associates, Peter and Jill Worsley, together with David Totty produced an analysis of wrecks on the mid-west coast. Other databases produced by the WA Museum include its 'Strangers on the Shore' listing. This work produced by cultural heritage student Lesley Silvester assisted by Michael Murray appears in both hard copy and electronic form and it documents the many interactions between Indigenous people and shipwreck survivors. They landed bereft of the trappings of power that are normally associated with those arriving for exploration, trading or commerce, rendering the interaction doubly of importance in analysing indigenous reactions to 'foreign' presence on their shores. The Australian Netherlands Committee on old Dutch Shipwrecks (ANCODS) provides details specific to the Dutch East India Company (VOC) ships lost on the coast, including a database on the artefacts raised. The VOC Society is another group providing information on the Dutch wrecks on the coast. Though concentrating on the Dutch East India Company, it also produces regional listings providing information on many shipwrecks. To assist researchers in obtaining detailed information on many of the wrecks (other than that appearing in its books, articles and journal entries) the WA Museum has made all its unpublished departmental reports available in PDF form. These deal with a wide variety of shipwreck-related issues.

== Regions ==
The WA Museum has also produced a series of pamphlets documenting wrecks in specific regions. Part of its 'wreck trail', or 'wreck access' concept welcoming visitors to shipwrecks as part of 'their' maritime heritage, these and the plaques placed above and below water at many sites are aimed towards cultural tourism, the recreational visitor and schools. Provision is also made for access to sites for people with disabilities, though this program produced with assistance from residents of the Rocky Bay Village is yet in its infancy. Sustainable visitation to the shipwrecks is welcomed and only three wrecks off the coast of Western Australia require a permit for entry to the site. These are the VOC ship Zuytdorp and the WWII adversaries Kormoran and HMAS Sydney. While also presenting its work in books, journals and other specialist outlets, the Department has also promulgated all its wreck reports to the web where they are available in PDF form. Appearing also are bibliographic and artefact databases, shipwreck projects and other data.

== Notable wrecks ==
The first known wreck on the Western Australian coast was the Trial (Tryall) in 1622. The Dutch East India Ship (VOC) Batavia, which was lost in 1629, is the best known, being the subject of many books, articles, an opera and numerous films. All the VOC ships following (see list below) have attracted considerable interest, partly because of the treasure they carried, the remarkable stories of their destruction and in some cases salvation, and also the possibility that in some cases survivors may have intermingled with the indigenous inhabitants. This is especially of interest at the wrecks of the Vergulde Draeck and Zuytdorp.

Other notable pre-colonial wrecks include Correio da Azia, a Portuguese Despatch vessel bound for Macau, and Rapid, an American China Trader bound for the Indies. These were both wrecked on the Ningaloo Reef, which like the Abrolhos Islands off Geraldton was a notorious "ship trap". Of the colonial-era wrecks, the James Matthews, a former slave ship, and the SS Xantho, an iron-hulled steamer with a unique ex-gunboat engine are the most prominent. Others prominent on the basis of their being excavated and on the amount of research conducted into them include the Elizabeth Belinda, Stefano, and Eglinton, all early wooden-hulled merchant vessels; the Sepia and Europa, iron barques; the Day Dawn, a former American whale ship; and the wooden whalers Star, Lively, and Lady Lyttelton. The iron-hulled SS Macedon, the composite barque Lady Elizabeth and the other Rottnest Island shipwrecks assume considerable prominence as a suite of sites presented in the "wreck trail", "wreck access" or "museum-without-walls" mode. The Swan River in Perth contains at least 37 shipwrecks. The oldest known wreck in the river is Dearden's flat, wrecked with a cargo of limestone near Dyoondalup Point Walter in 1882.

In the modern era, HMAS Sydney and the German auxiliary cruiser Kormoran, adversaries in World War II, have been the subject of extensive study. Both wrecks were discovered in 2008.

== Timeline of significant wrecks ==
This is a listing of all shipwrecks recorded on the WA Museum database.

- 1622 Tryall, British East India Company ship, on the Tryal Rocks [sic], near the Monte Bello Islands
- 1629 Batavia, Dutch East India Company (VOC) ship, on the Houtman Abrolhos
- 1656 Vergulde Draeck, VOC ship, near Ledge Point
- 1712 Zuytdorp, VOC ship, north of Kalbarri
- 1727 Zeewijk, VOC ship, on the Houtman Abrolhos
- c.1806-08 Lively, English whaler, on Mermaid Reef, Rowley Shoals
- 1811 Rapid, American China trader, on Ningaloo Reef
- 1816 Correio Da Azia, Portuguese Despatch vessel, on Ningaloo Reef
- 1824 Belinda, A coastal brig, at Middle Island, Esperance
- 1829 Marquis of Anglesea, a ship, at Fremantle
- 1830 James, A colonial trader, at Owen Anchorage, south of Fremantle
- 1830 Emily Taylor, a brig, blown ashore near Fremantle
- 1830 Cumberland, British ship, south of Hamelin Bay
- 1839 Elizabeth, Australian barque, near Cottesloe
- 1839 Lancier, French barque, near Stragglers Reef, Fremantle
- 1839 North America, American wooden ship rig, whaler, at Koombana Bay
- 1840 Governor Endicott, American barque, whaler, at Toby Inlet, Geographe Bay
- 1840 Samuel Wright American whale ship, beached at Koombana Bay
- 1841 Perseverant, French whaler, on Dirk Hartog Island
- 1841 James Matthews, a wooden brig and former slave-ship, at Woodman Point
- 1842 Ocean Queen, British barque, on the Abrolhos
- 1844 Cervantes, a wooden whaling barque, at Cervantes
- 1849 Arpenteur, British brig, Hassell Beach in Cheyne Bay
- 1850 Harlequin, Australian schooner, West Cape Howe, west of Albany
- 1850 Wave, Australian brigantine, in Cheyne Bay
- 1852 Eglinton, a wooden barque, lost off Wanneroo
- 1859 Robertina, Australian brig, near Rockingham
- 1861 Cochituate, American barque, on the Abrolhos
- 1863 African, British ship, on African Reef south of Geraldton
- 1864 Calliance, British ship, at Camden Harbour
- 1867 Emma, Australian schooner, Ningaloo Reef
- 1867 Lass of Geraldton, Australian 2-masted schooner, southwest of Peel Inlet
- 1867 Favourite, Australian coaster, Port Gregory
- 1867 Lady Lyttleton, British barque, in King George Sound
- 1868 Northumberland, a wooden barque, in King George Sound
- 1872 SS Xantho, an iron hulled steamer, at Port Gregory
- 1872 Fanny Nicholson, Australian whaling barque in King George Sound
- 1874 Centaur, Scottish-built iron brig, north of Fremantle
- 1874 Chalmers, British ship, near Rockingham
- 1874 Sea Bird, Australian two-masted schooner, Seabird near Moore RIver
- 1874 Contest, British barque, near Rockingham
- 1875 Fairy Queen, Australian brigantine, at Exmouth Gulf
- 1875 Stefano, an Austro-Hungarian barque, on the Ningaloo Reef
- 1870s An unidentified wooden ship, on the Ningaloo Reef
- 1875 Zedora, British barque, off Fremantle
- 1876 Gem, Australian cutter, off Rottnest island
- 1876 Hero of the Nile, British barque, near Rockingham
- 1876 SS Georgette Australian steamer, Calgardup Gully, Margaret River
- 1877 Hadda, Australian barque, in the Abrolhos Islands
- 1877 Twilight, Australian cutter, Twilight Cove, near Esperance
- 1877 Bunyip, Australian cutter, Twilight Cove, near Esperance
- 1878 Lady Elizabeth, British composite barque, off Rottnest island
- 1878 Diana, British schooner, south of Fremantle
- 1878 James Service, Australian iron barque, off Mandurah
- 1878 Marten, Australian schooner, in the Abrolhos Islands
- 1879 Ben Ledi, British iron ship, in the Abrolhos Islands
- 1879 Rosette, Australian schooner, Rosemary Island, Dampier Archipelago
- 1879 Mary, Australian schooner, near Busselton
- 1879 Manfred, British barque, in the Lacepede Islands
- c.1880 Browse Island unidentified, Guano ship?
- c.1880 Ringbolt Bay unidentified, Australian barge near Augusta
- c.1880 Mardie Station unidentified, Australian pearler?
- 1880 Batoe Bassi, Dutch barque, near Esperance
- 1880 Mayflower, Australian brig, near Augusta
- 1880 Star, Australian schooner, near Rockingham
- 1882 Agincourt, Australian wood barque, Hamelin Bay
- 1882 Dearden's Flat, cargo barge, Swan River
- 1883 Chaudiere, Australian wood barque, Hamelin Bay
- 1883 SS Macedon, an iron steamer, off Rottnest island
- 1884 Yarra, Australian iron barque, Scott Reef
- 1885 Kingfisher, Australian iron hulk, Albany
- 1886 SS Right Jeremy, a former whale chaser, Esperance
- 1886 Mira Flores, German iron barque, off Rottnest island
- 1886 Belle of Bunbury, Australian schooner, off Penguin Island
- 1886 Day Dawn, Australian barque, in Careening Bay
- 1887 Janet, Australian schooner, off Rottnest island
- 1887 SS Perth, Australian iron screw steamer, Ningaloo reef
- 1887 Amur, Australian barque, near Rockingham
- 1888 Benan, British iron ship, Ningaloo reef
- 1888 Ada, Australian cutter, Oyster harbour, Albany
- 1890 Denton Holme, British iron barque, off Rottnest island
- 1891 Raven, Australian barque, off Rottnest island
- 1891 Eveline Mary, Australian schooner, Abrolhos
- 1892 SS Sunbeam, British iron screw steamer, Osborne Islands
- 1893 Dato, Australian brig, Carreening Bay
- 1893 Ulidia, British iron schooner, off Fremantle
- 1893 Priestman Dredge, British grab dredge, off Fremantle
- 1894 SS Eddystone, Australian iron screw steamer, Depuch Island
- 1894 Sarah Burnyeat, Australian wood hulk, Albany
- 1895 Mayhill, British steel 4-masted barque, off Geraldton
- 1897 Europa, Italian barque, near Jurien Bay
- 1897 Villalta, British steel barque, Moore River
- 1897 Carbet Castle, British iron barque, Koombanah Bay
- 1898 Redemptora, (ex North American), wooden Clipper ship (built in 1851) abandoned/sunk in Jervoise Bay in 1898
- 1898 Sepia, an iron barque, off Carnac Island
- 1899 City of York, British iron barque, off Rottnest island
- 1899 Carlisle Castle, British iron ship, near Rockingham
- 1900 Katinka, German iron barque, Hamelin Bay
- 1900 Cambria, Australian steamship, off Rottnest Island
- 1901 Gudrun, Norwegian barque, Shark Bay
- 1901 SS Karrakatta, Australian iron screw steamer, Cape Leveque
- 1901 Highland Forest, British barque, Warnbro near Rockingham
- 1901 Ville de Rouen, French 4-masted barque, Moore River
- 1902 SS Zvir, Australian iron screw steamer, Ningaloo reef
- 1902 SS Franklin, Australian iron screw steamer, Point Malcolm east of Esperance
- 1903 SS Escort, Australian steam tug, Walpole
- 1903 Camilla, Australian lighter, south of Fremantle
- 1904 SS Mildura, Australian iron screw steamer, North West Cape
- 1904 Conference, Australian iron barque, Quinn's Rocks north of Fremantle
- 1905 Omeo, Australian iron barque South of Fremantle
- 1905 SS Orizaba, British steel screw steamer, near Rockingham
- 1908 SS Windsor, British steel screw steamer, Abrolhos islands
- 1910 SS Pericles, off Cape Leeuwin.
- 1911 Mandalay, Norwegian iron barque, south coast
- 1912 Crown of England, Norwegian iron ship, Depuch Island
- 1912 SS Koombana, off Port Hedland
- 1914 SS Cambewarra, Australian iron screw steamer, Jurien Bay
- 1914 Grace Darling, Australian schooner, Lancelin
- 1916 Dunster Castle, Australian screw steamer, Shoal Cape, Esperance
- 1917 SS Dunskey, Australian tug, Nornalup Inlet
- 1923 SS Fin, Norwegian iron whaleship, Ningaloo reef
- 1923 SS Venus, Australian, Moore River
- 1923 Sea Flower, Seabird near Moore River
- 1920s 19-Mile Unidentified pearling schooner?, Broome
- 1921 Arab, Australian schooner, Abrolhos
- 1922 SS Kwinana, Australian, off Kwinana
- 1926 Abemama, 3-masted schooner, Jervoise Bay
- 1930 SS Dolphin, Penguin Island, Jervoise Bay
- 1930s Turtle Boat, Australian, wooden, near Rockingham
- 1931 SS Alacrity, tugboat, Jervoise Bay
- 1931 SS Chofuku Maru, Japanese iron screw steamer, Ningaloo reef
- 1936 SS Stanford, Norwegian motor ship, African Reef south of Geraldton
- 1942 Uribes, Australian 3-masted schooner, Thomson Bay, Rottnest island
- 1942 HMAS Sydney and the German auxiliary cruiser Kormoran, off Shark Bay
- 1961 Jon Jim, a fishing boat, wrecked at Pelsaert Island, Houtman Abrolhos
- 1963 SS Alkimos, a former Liberty Ship, north of Fremantle
- 1990 SS Cheynes II, a former whale chaser, in King George Sound
- 1991 Sanko Harvest, in the Archipelago of the Recherché

== See also ==
- ANCODS (Australian Netherlands Committee on Old Dutch Shipwrecks)
- List of shipwrecks of Australia § Western Australia
- Rottnest Island shipwrecks
- Western Australian Museum § Maritime and Shipwrecks Museums
