= Rottnest Island shipwrecks =

Shipwrecks around Rottnest Island, Western Australia

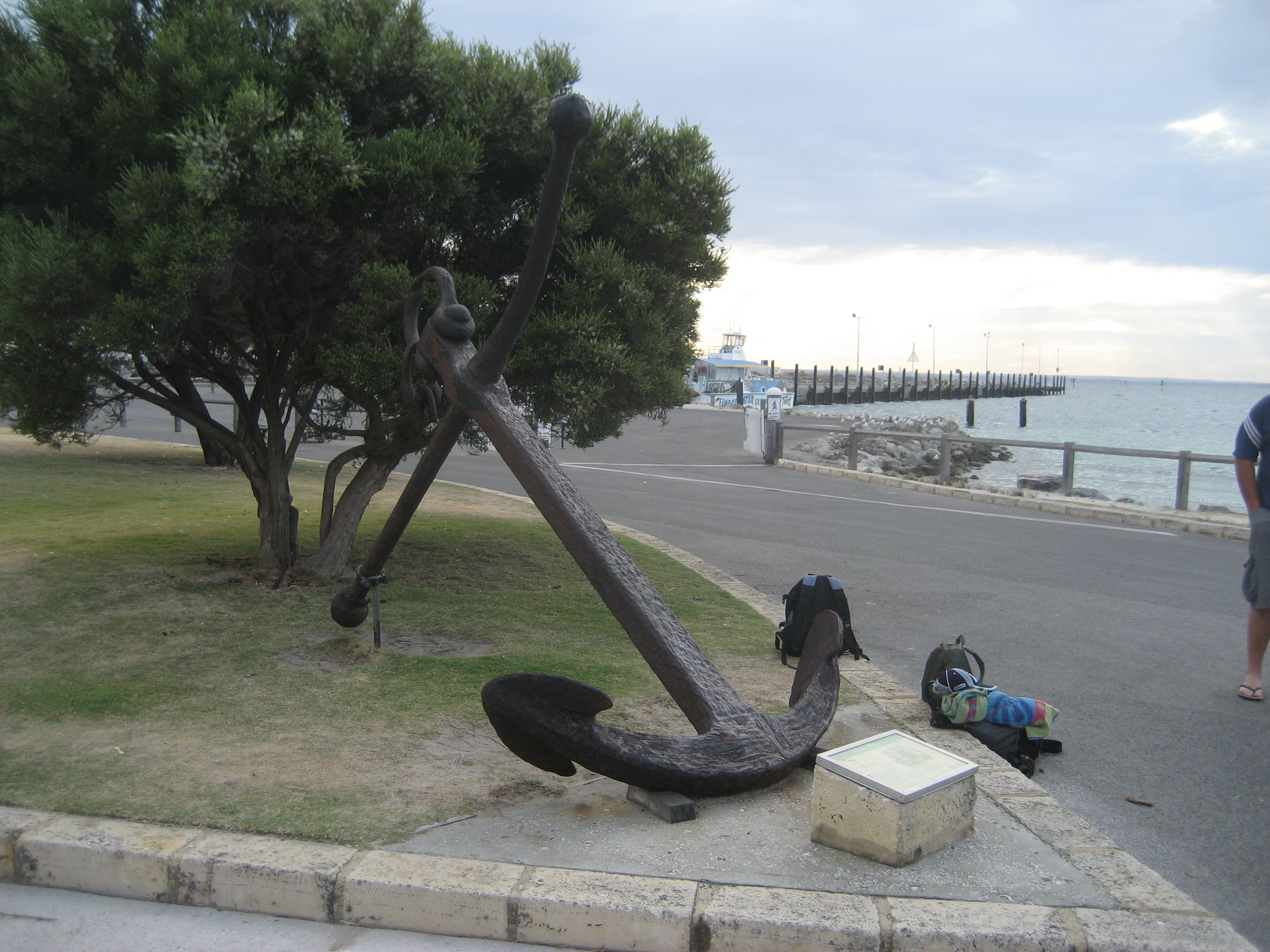
Anchor from Mira Flores (1886)

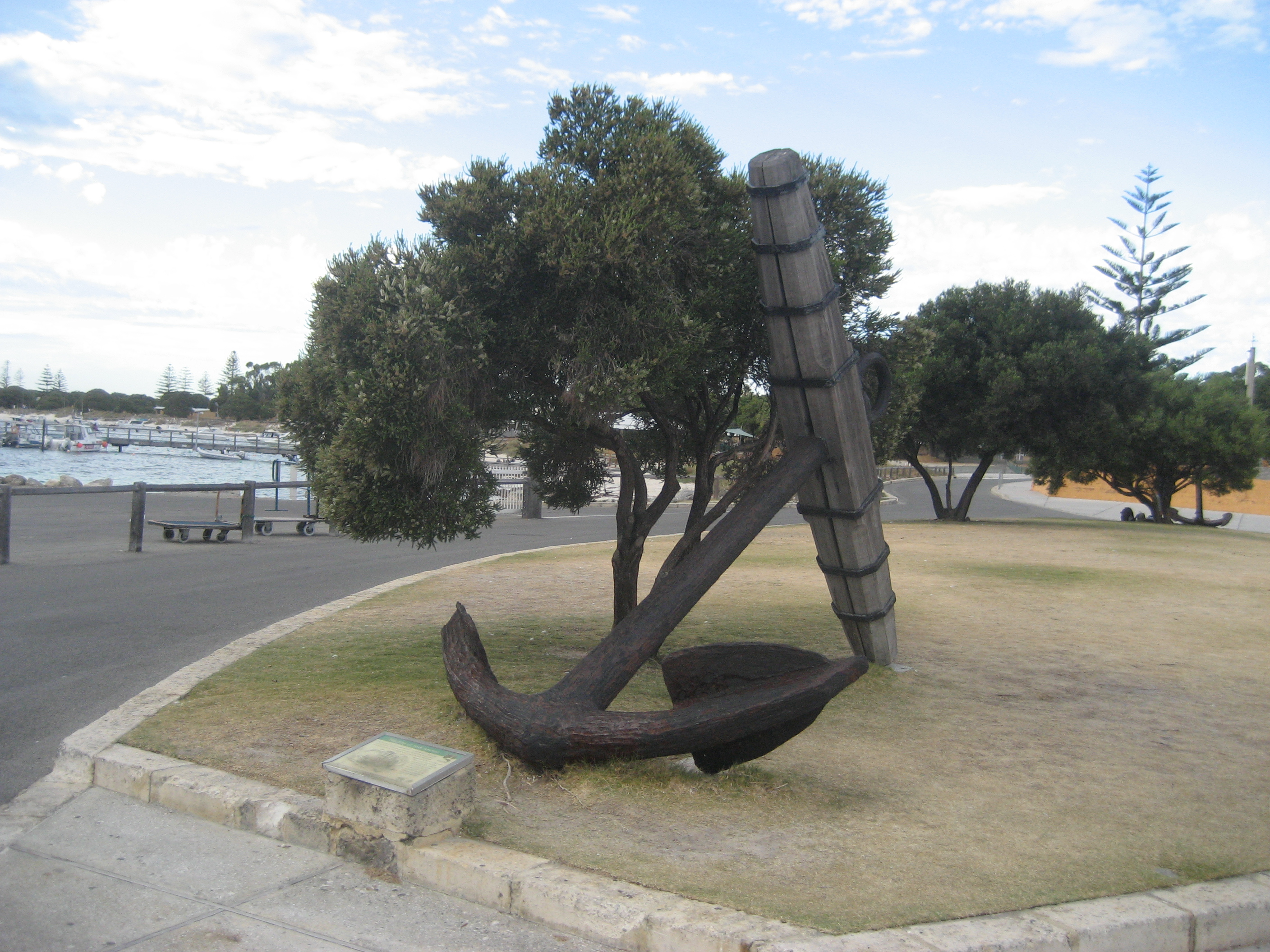
Anchor from City of York (1899)

Since the first Europeans visited the west coast of Australia in the 17th century, Rottnest Island has seen numerous shipwrecks. The 11-kilometre-long (6.8 mi) and 4.5-kilometre-wide (2.8 mi) island is surrounded by hidden and partly exposed reefs whilst being buffeted by north-westerly winter gales as well as very strong south-west summer sea "breezes". It is situated 12 kilometres (7.5 mi) west of the port of Fremantle, meaning that much of the maritime traffic to Western Australia's major port passes close by.

Following is a list of the thirteen larger and surveyed shipwrecks close by to Rottnest Island (32°0′S 115°31′E). The list is in chronological order. Details of every shipwreck at the island are unknown, as many thousands of vessels of varying size have visited the island each year. Other ships have been lost (or in the case of the Rottnest ship graveyard, deliberately scuttled) in waters further off-shore, including some closer to Fremantle. Still others were stranded on rocks at Rottnest but were refloated. Anitra II, for example is in this latter category, but is included in the list as the hull was on display on the island near the main settlement. It was lost at night during the 1979 Parmelia Yacht Race only a few nautical miles from the finish line.

Plaques have been located next to the wrecks as well as onshore to indicate their locations as part of a "wreck trail" concept produced by the Western Australian Museum in association with the Rottnest Island Authority. In encouraging full access to all the sites, by marking them on navigation charts and by producing interpretive materials in exhibitions, pamphlets and on the plaques, the wrecks have become part of a "museum-without-walls" concept. All of the wrecks are protected under Commonwealth legislation in the Historic Shipwrecks Act 1976 and State legislation in the Maritime Archaeology Act (1973). The Rottnest Island Wreck Trail was the first in the Southern Hemisphere and the first of Western Australia's heritage trails. The concept has been widely copied since.

== Lighthouses ==
The first stone lighthouse built in Western Australia was completed in 1849 and built in the centre of the island. The 20-metre (66 ft) tower was replaced in 1896 with a new tower, the current Wadjemup Lighthouse.

Following an inquiry after the City of York disaster in 1899, the Bathurst Lighthouse was built at Bathurst Point on the north-eastern end of the island.

== Major shipwrecks ==
Major shipwrecks around Rottnest Island, in chronological order.

#	Ship	Date wrecked	Location	Notes
1	Transit	8 May 1842	Transit reef (Duck rock), Thomson Bay; 31°58′59″S 115°33′00″E	Wooden schooner, 124 tons, 27.1 metres (88.8 ft) long. Voyage from the Cape of Good Hope. There was a suggestion that her master had been careless or had deliberately wrecked the vessel. No lives lost.
2	Gem	18 May 1876	Thomson Bay; 31°59′15″S 115°33′41″E	Wooden cutter, 52 tons. Carrying 500 tons of wheat from Port Irwin to Fremantle. The day after she left port, the assistant lighthouse keeper on Rottnest reported seeing her 3 kilometres (1.9 mi) east of the island. The lighthouse keeper at Arthur Head also saw the vessel, but later saw only the top mast and crosstree visible above the water. The Fremantle harbour master found the vessel sunk with no sign of survivors. Two days later, divers found a rug in the captain’s cabin. Three days later decking, personal possessions and sacks of grain began washing ashore. “A cover-up by the harbour-master was also suggested because of the discrepancies in the information he gave about the vessel’s position. He is thought to have profited from unlawful salvage.”
3	Lady Elizabeth	30 June 1878	near Dyer Island; 32°01′03″S 115°32′58″E	Wooden barque, 658 tons. From Fremantle for Shanghai, one life lost. Wreck lies on a sandy bottom in Bickley Bay with the bow wedged into a reef in about 10 metres (33 ft) with a portion of her hull and ribs exposed. Some artefacts remain.
4	Macedon	21 March 1883	Transit Reef; 31°59′12″S 115°33′25″E	Iron steamship, 826/796 tons. Carrying passengers, luggage and a cargo of horses from Fremantle to Beagle Bay. She struck a reef and began taking water quickly filling the engine room with water. Rough weather quickly destroyed the vessel. The hull was sold for salvage at auction for £170.
5	Mira Flores	30 January 1886	Horseshoe Reef (north); 32°00′19″S 115°28′15″E	German-owned iron barque, 500 tons, 161.5 feet (49.2 m). From London under charter by the Western Australian Shipping Association. Crew saved. Lies on a shallow reef in about 10 metres (33 ft) of water showing considerable damage to her stern and midships.
6	Janet	11 December 1887	Transit Reef 31°59′11″S 115°33′30″E	Three masted wooden schooner, 211 tons built in Fremantle (at the time, the largest vessel having been built there). Wrecked while inward bound to Fremantle from Colombo. Wreckage including two anchors lies in about 5 metres (16 ft) of water a short distance from Macedon and Denton Holme.
7	Denton Holme	25 September 1890	Transit Reef; 31°59′09″S 115°33′24″E	Iron barque, 998 tons 213.2 feet (65.0 m) long. Built as Star Of Denmark in 1889, name changed. From Glasgow to Fremantle, wrecked almost on top of Macedon in about 6 metres (20 ft) of water.
8	Raven	11 May 1891	Dyer's Island Reef; 32°01′16″S 115°33′05″E	Wooden barque, 344 tons, 121.1 feet (36.9 m) long. Lies partly buried in the sand at a depth of about 6 metres (20 ft).
9	Ulidia	18 May 1893	Stragglers Reef south of Rottnest; 32°03′28″S 115°37′44″E	Iron ship, 2405 tons, 300 feet (91 m) long. Left Fremantle for Newcastle, England.
10	City of York	12 July 1899	200 metres (660 ft) offshore at Cape of York Bay; 31°59′39″S 115°29′20″E	1218 tons, 229.8 feet (70.0 m) long. On a voyage from San Francisco to Fremantle carrying timber cargo. Wrecked during a storm after receiving confused signals from the lighthouse operator on the island. Eleven men drowned.
11	Uribes	1 July 1942	Just north of False Jetty at Phillip Rock, Thompson Bay; 32°00′10″S 115°33′26″E	Auxiliary powered three-masted wooden schooner, 250 tons, 110 feet (34 m) long. Built in Stockton-on-Tees. Engines failed and she dragged her anchors, going ashore. Cargo included 150 six-inch shells and two motor vehicles. Lies in shallow water about 12 metres (39 ft) from shore.
12	Anitra II	26 November 1979	Cape Vlamingh (West End); 32°01′33″S 115°26′55″E	26 ton ketch. Was competing in the 14,000-nautical-mile (26,000 km) Parmelia Yacht Race and nearing the finish at Fremantle. Hull was salvaged and was on display near main settlement.
13	Kiryo Maru 1	6 August 1984	Cathedral Rocks; 32°01′13″S 115°26′58″E	Japanese tuna boat, 36 metres (118 ft).

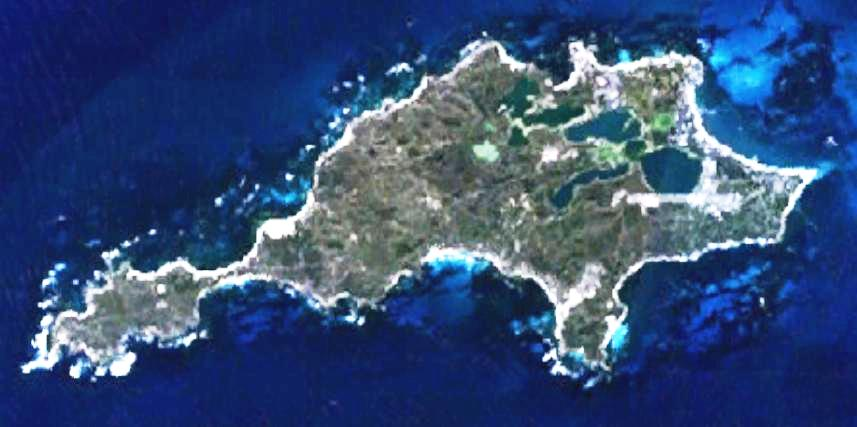
Rottnest from space, showing the extensive reef system surrounding the island's coast.

== See also ==
- Shipwrecks of Western Australia
