= Aagtekerke (1724) =

Ship lost sailing from the Cape of Good Hope to Batavia in 1726

History

Dutch Republic
- Name: Aagtekerke
- Namesake: Village of Aagtekerke
- Owner: Dutch East India Company
- Builder: Chamber of Zeeland
- Launched: 1724
- Fate: Lost without trace in 1726

General characteristics
- Displacement: 280 tons
- Length: 41 m (135 ft)
- Complement: 200

Aagtekerke (Dutch pronunciation: [ˈaːxtəˌkɛrkə]) was a ship of the Dutch East India Company built in 1724. It was lost without trace during its maiden voyage in 1725–26, sailing from Cape of Good Hope in the Dutch Cape Colony to Batavia in the Dutch East Indies.

== Description ==
Aagtekerke was built in 1724 by the Chamber of Zeeland of the Dutch East India Company, on their wharf in Middelburg. It was named after the nearby village of Aagtekerke. The ship was 41 metres (135 ft) long and had a load capacity of 425 last. It had a crew of 200 men, and carried 36 guns.

== Maiden voyage ==
On 27 May 1725, the ship sailed out from Fort Rammekens (near Ritthem) under the command of Jan Witboon. The ship first sailed to Cape of Good Hope in the Dutch Cape Colony, where it arrived on 3 January 1726, possibly to load ivory.

On 27 January 1726, the ship left for Batavia in the Dutch East Indies, but was lost without trace. At the time, the ship was carrying silver coins and precious metals with a total value of 200,000 guilders, equivalent to €5.9 million in 2024.

There is some evidence from the crew of the wrecked ship Zeewijk that Aagtekerke may have been wrecked on the Abrolhos Islands, because they found some remains of a Dutch vessel that had been wrecked before them.

== See also ==
- List of people who disappeared mysteriously at sea

== Sources ==
- Anderson, Ross; Duivenvoorde, Wendy van; Morrison, Patrick; Shefi, Deb; Paterson, Alistair; Manders, Martijn (2023). Report on 'Mapping the Old with the New: Re-imaging the 1727 Zeewijk Shipwreck Site with New Recording Technology' Project (PDF) (Report). Western Australian Museum, Department of Maritime Archaeology.
- Bateson, Charles (1972). Australian Shipwrecks. Vol. 1, 1622–1850. Sydney: AH and AW Reed. ISBN 0-589-07112-2.
- Halls, Christopher (1996) [1966]. "The Loss of the Dutch East Indiaman, Aagtekerke". Annual Dog Watch (23) (Reprint ed.). Melbourne: Shiplovers' Society of Victoria.
- Henderson, Graeme (1978). "The Mysterious Fate of the Dutch East Indiaman Aagtekerke: a Review of the Eighteenth and Nineteenth Century Sources". Westerly. 23 (2): 71–78. ISSN 0043-342X.
- Henderson, Graeme; Viduka, Andrew; Parkinson, James; Moss, Alexander (2015). "Closing in on the 'Fortuyn': a Progress Report". Journal of the Australasian Institute for Maritime Archaeology. 39: 27–43. ISSN 1447-0276.
- "Details of Voyage 2622.1 from Rammekens". Huygens Institute for the History of the Netherlands. The Dutch East India Company's Shipping Between the Netherlands and Asia 1595-1795. 10 November 2022.
- "Aagtekerke (1724)". VOC Site (in Dutch). 2026.
