= ANCODS =

Organization for managing old Dutch shipwrecks off the coast of Western Australia

Agreement between Australia and the Netherlands Concerning Old Dutch Shipwrecks
- Signed: 6 November 1972
- Location: The Hague, Netherlands
- Signatories: Australia; Netherlands
- Languages: Dutch, English

The Australian Netherlands Committee on Old Dutch Shipwrecks (ANCODS) is an organization tasked with maintaining and allocating artefacts from 17th and 18th century Dutch shipwrecks off the coast of Western Australia. It was founded in 1972 by the Agreement between Australia and the Netherlands Concerning Old Dutch Shipwrecks.

== History ==
=== The ships ===
Development of ANCODS began with the discovery of four Dutch East India Company ships off the coast of Western Australia in the 1950s–1960s.

==== Zuytdorp (1712) ====
In 1712, Zuytdorp struck the cliffs 60 km (37 mi) north of the mouth of the Murchison River. It was the only wreck of the four from which no survivors returned to Batavia (modern day Jakarta). Some evidence exists of survivors reaching the top of the cliffs, but it is unclear what exactly transpired. Zuytdorp remained where it sank until the location of the wreck was publicized by the local press in the 1930s, although rumours of its existence had been previously circulated in 1927. It was not until 1958 that the wreckage was confirmed as that of the Zuytdorp by Philip Playford. The Western Australian Museum (WAM) carried out archaeological investigations of both the underwater site and the associated survivor camp from 1974 until the late 1990s. The Zuytdorp Nature Reserve was formed in 1992 to protect the wreck. As a result, diving is prohibited in the waters surrounding the wreck. WAM currently has 1,300 artefacts in the ANCODS Collection for the site.

==== Vergulde Draeck (1656) ====
Wrecked in 1656 south of Ledge Point, Western Australia, the Vergulde Draeck (or Gilt Dragon, as it is more commonly known) was the first to be relocated during the 1950–1960s. However, Alan Robinson, who claimed to have discovered the vessel, could not remember where the wreck was originally located. Artefacts were then collected on 14 April 1963 when a spear fishing group stumbled across them. James, Alan, Graeme Henderson, and John Cowan, members of the spear fishing group that discovered site, offered their rights to the site to the WAM. However the last member of the group, Alan Robinson, did not. WAM accepted the rights. However, looters used explosives to breach the vessel and search for valuable artefacts, mainly coins. Due to looting, the nature of the seabed and occasional severe storms, the site is spread over a 40 m × 50 m (130 ft × 160 ft) area on a reef and is very difficult to locate. Jeremy Green and staff from WAM recovered artefacts from the wreck in archaeological seasons between 1972 and 1983. The ANCODS collection currently includes large numbers of ballast bricks, clay pipes, stoneware, wooden and metal fragments as well as elephant tusks, leather shoes and coin-, eight hundred of which are in the custody of the Money Museum in Utrecht.

==== Batavia (1629) ====
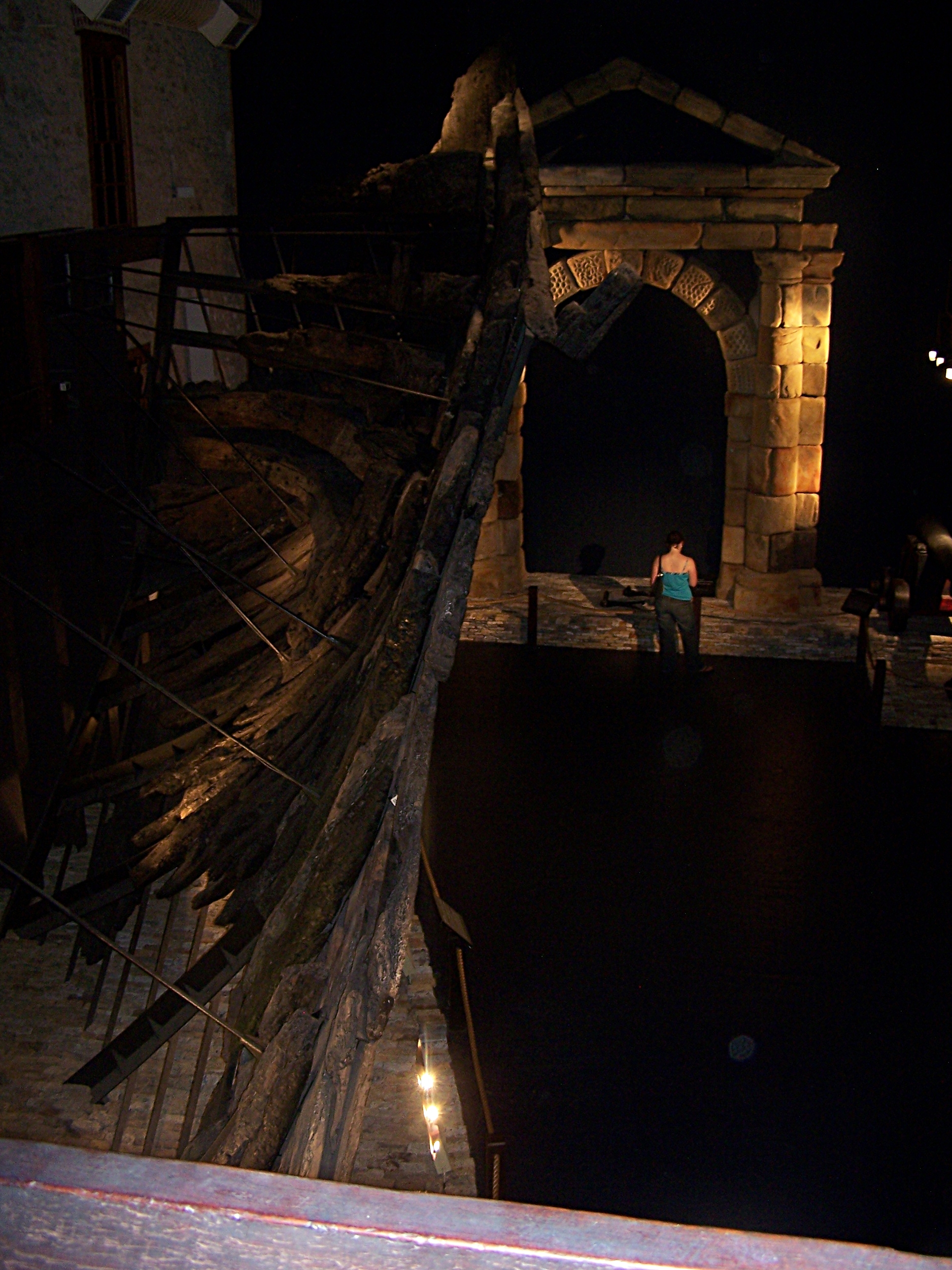
Batavia's hull remains and a replica of the portico on display in the Fremantle Shipwreck Gallery, WA

Batavia struck the reef surrounding the Wallaby Group of the Houtman Abrolhos in 1629. Survivors set up camp nearby and a small party was sent off in search of fresh water. When no water was found, the party was sent to Batavia (modern day Jakarta) to get help and to notify the government of a mutiny aboard the ship. The survivors left on the island suffered losses due to murder, starvation and exposure. Discovered in 1963, this site is one of the more famous due to events that led up to the wreck and the ensuing strife among the surviving crew. Between 1970 and 1974, WAM recovered many artefacts from the wreck and raised the remains of the hull for display in the museum. Also retrieved was a dismantled portico destined for Batavia's port and human remains. The ANCODS collection holds 6,823 artefacts related to the Batavia and the remains of its hull. The assembled portico is on display in WAM's Fremantle Ship Wreck Galleries.

==== Zeewijk (1727) ====
The Zeewijk was wrecked in 1727 on the Pelsaert Group in the Houtman Abrolhos, Western Australia. Much of the cargo that was carried aboard was transferred to the survivor camp on Gun Island and perhaps later returned to Batavia, via the Sloepie. This ship was built by the survivors on Gun Island and carried 82 people back to Batavia. No substantial hull remains, although many fragments have been recovered. Artefacts were collected in the 1840s by the island's guano diggers. Most of these artefacts were later given to WAM. The main wreck site was identified in 1968, containing remains such as rigging, cannons, kegs of nails, wine glasses, and ceramics. Much of the remains of the survivors' camps have been destroyed by the guano diggers and wildlife, however. WAM holds 4,196 artefacts in the ANCODS collection related to the Zeewijk.

=== Before ANCODS ===
The discovery of these vessels sparked interest in protecting the shipwrecks in Western Australia. In 1964, amendments to the Museum Act 1959 (WA) were made to include the preservation of material from wrecks for the benefit of the public, and the WAM was vested with the sole right to control vessels abandoned, wrecked or stranded before 1900. In 1969 a new Museum Act was enacted and the former Board of the Museum became a trustee. Much of the historic shipwreck amendments made to the previous act were kept. However, one of the biggest changes was to remove the finder's reward and compensation for artefacts. The Museum Act 1969 was then incorporated into the Maritime Archaeology Act 1973 of WA to include changes based on the museum's experience since 1964. In this time Alan Robinson, one of the finders of the Vergulde Draeck, sued WAM, claimed that the legislation implemented was not valid. This was proved correct over many years and from many angles the debate was held. The Commonwealth was looking into protection itself and used the end of the legal battle to release its own legislation concerning shipwrecks. Under the Historic Shipwrecks Act 1976 the WAM was given the power it needed to continue as it had been.

=== ANCODS agreement ===
Due to the decline of the Dutch East India Company in the 18th century, it was nationalised by the Dutch government. The modern government, therefore, later became the owners of the company and its ships, including wrecked vessels. The Dutch, through agreements between the Australian Government and the WAM, proposed the ANCODS Agreement in 1964. The Australian government and the WAM took no action with it until the early 1970s, however. With the beginning of the legal battle between Robinson and the WAM, the Agreement between Australia and the Netherlands Concerning Old Dutch Shipwrecks was signed on 6 November 1972. With the signing of the ANCODS agreement,

The Netherlands, as successor to the property and assets of the Dutch "Vereenigde Oostindische Compagnie", transferred to Australia all its right, title and interest in and to wrecked vessels of the Dutch "Vereenigde Oostindische Compagnie" lying on or off the coast of the State of Western Australia and in and to any articles thereof and Australia accepted that right, title and interest.

— Historic Shipwrecks Act

See ANCODS legislation below for the full agreement.

== Activities ==
Controlling the interests of the ANCODS Agreement is the ANCODS Committee. This committee consists of four members, two from the Netherlands and two from Australia, chosen for their expertise. The current Australian members are Dr John PS Bach OAM and Professor Geoffrey C Bolton AO. The Netherlands are represented by Ms Andrea Otte, a representative of the Dutch Ministry of Culture, and Mr Eric Stating, a Councillor of the Embassy of the Kingdom of the Netherlands. Undertaking the Secretariat duties of the committee is the Maritime Heritage Section of the Department of Sustainability, Environment, Water, Population and Communities. Linked to the committee are two groups of stakeholders composed of four museum and government representatives, who also take part in decisions regarding the ANCODS agreement.

In 1997 the ANCODS colloquium, a three-day conference to discuss the position of ANCODS at the time and to provide new recommendations, was held. Two resolutions were formed and proposed:

Resolution 1: In the practice of modern archaeology, it is generally accepted that the collections should remain within their original context. It is suggested that the ANCODS should promote the concept that the whole ANCODS collection should remain under the administration of the Western Australian Maritime Museum, which should administer the location, movements and loan of the collection. Resolution 2: That the research role of ANCODS, as originally outlined in the Agreement, be expanded to encompass the concept of a joint Australian and Netherlands scientific research (JANSR), which would include education, dissemination of information, scientific research projects and community access. The ANCODS Committee should also examine the future role and aims of ANCODS.

== Collection ==
As part of the ANCODS Agreement, Australia took on the responsibility to look after all the artefacts recovered from the wrecks, including their recovery, conservation, storage and display. Formally, artefacts were housed in four museums: the Western Australian Maritime Museum, the Australian National Maritime Museum, the Netherlands Maritime Museum and the Geldmuseum (Money Museum) in Utrecht. However, as part of the 1997 Colloquium, it was advised that all artefacts be returned to the WAM in accordance with modern archaeological standards. On 15 September 2010, the plans to hand over artefacts in the care of the Netherlands to WAM were finalised; the agreement was signed by the Australian ambassador to the Netherlands, Lydia Morton, and the Netherlands Secretary for Culture, Judith van Kranendonk, aboard the Batavia replica in Lelystad, The Netherlands.

An official handover took place on 9 November 2010, conducted by Mr Willem Andreae, Ambassador of the Kingdom of the Netherlands, to Senator Don Farrell, the Parliamentary Secretary for Sustainability and Urban Water. The ceremony was held at the Australian National Maritime Museum in Sydney. To symbolise the final transfer of artefacts, another ceremony was held at the Western Australian Maritime Museum on 21 February 2011. Mr Willem Andreae handed a pewter plate recovered from the Batavia wreck to Premier Colin Barnett. A video of the unpacking of the last crate of artefacts can be viewed on the WAM website. As part of the repatriation of artefacts, the Western Australian Maritime Museum created a database which includes photos and descriptions of all artefacts recovered from the four VOC shipwrecks. This permits scholars to access the collections. Exhibits are currently being displayed in the Western Australian Maritime Museum and the Australian National Maritime Museum with talk of an ANCODS exhibition in 2012 or later.
