= Lady Elizabeth (1879) =

Iron barque beached in the Falkland Islands

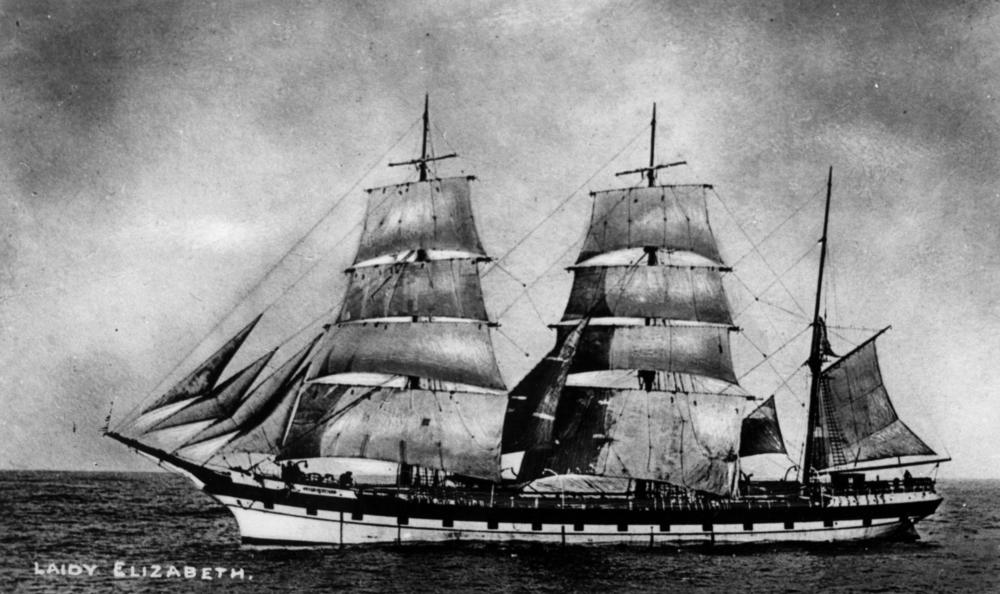
- Lady Elizabeth

History
- Name: Lady Elizabeth
- Owner: John Wilson (1879–1886); George Christen Karran (1886–1906); L. Lydersen (Skibsaktieselskabet) (1906–1913); Falkland Islands Company (1913–1936); Crown Receiver of Wrecks, Falkland Islands (1936–current)
- Port of registry: (United Kingdom) London (1879), (United Kingdom) Castletown, Isle of Man (1886), Tvedestrand, Norway (1906),
- Builder: Robert Thompson Jr., Sunderland England
- Yard number: 98
- Launched: 6 June 1879
- Identification: Official ID #81576
- Fate: Beached in Whalebone Cove, Stanley Harbour, Falkland Islands

General characteristics
- Class & type: Cargo, Iron hull, 3 masted Barque rig
- Tonnage: 1,155 net register tons (1,208 gross register tons)
- Length: 67.97 m (223.0 ft)
- Beam: 10.67 m (35.0 ft)
- Depth: 6.52 m (21 ft 5 in)
- Decks: Wood
- Propulsion: Sail
- Crew: 18 to 25

Lady Elizabeth Wreck Site
- Interactive map of Lady Elizabeth Wreck Site
- Coordinates: 51°41′19.67″S 57°48′14.98″W

Lady Elizabeth is a wrecked iron barque of 1,155 tons built by Robert Thompson Jr. of Southwick, Sunderland and launched on 4 June 1879. Robert Thompson Jr. was one of the sons of Robert Thompson Sr. who owned and operated the family ran shipyard J. L. Thompson & Sons. Thompson Jr. eventually left the family business in 1854 to start his own shipbuilding business in Southwick, Sunderland. The ship was built for John Wilson as a replacement for the 658-ton, 1869-built barque Lady Elizabeth which sank off Rottnest Island, Western Australia in 1878.

== History ==
The builders of the second Lady Elizabeth had also built the first ship. The ship had three masts and was just under average size compared to barques built by Robert Thompson. However, the later Lady Elizabeth was still the seventh largest ship the firm built. John Wilson remained the owner of Lady Elizabeth and she was captained by Alexander Findley from Montrose until 15 March 1884 when he took out several loans from G. Oliver and also with the bank. Eventually, John Wilson declared bankruptcy and all of his ships, including Lady Elizabeth were sold off.

The new owner was George Christian Karran who purchased the ship a few months later. Karran's family owned several ships, but this was George Christian Karran's first ship. Karran captained the ship for a few years. After owning the ship for a few years, Karran's elder brother Robert Gick Karran died, leaving George to take command of Manx King. He remained the owner of Lady Elizabeth until 1906. In 1906 Lady Elizabeth was purchased by the Norwegian company Skibasaktieselskabet for £3,250. The company was managed by L. Lydersen and Lady Elizabeth was captained by Peter Julius Hoegh.

== Events ==
On 23 February 1884, Lady Elizabeth suffered substantial damage from a cyclone. She sustained damage to the front of the poop deck after it was stoved in. Many of her sails were lost or severely damaged. Despite the damage, the ship was able to make it to port in Sydney, Australia where six crew members jumped ship. Another death occurred on the voyage when William Leach fell from aloft and later died from his injuries. This was the third voyage under the command of Captain Karran.

On 10 May 1890, Captain Karran stepped down as captain after six voyages and Captain H. C. Lever took command of Lady Elizabeth.

In January 1906, Lady Elizabeth was sold to the Norwegian company Skibasaktieselskabet of Sundet, Boroen.

== Mystery of lost sailors ==
During Captain Julius Hoegh's command of the ship, two crew members went missing after suffering from malarial fever. Lady Elizabeth left Callao, Peru with a crew that included several Finns on 26 September (year unknown, but between 1906 and 1913). Just after leaving port, one of the Finns, a man named Granquiss, became ill. Captain Hoegh diagnosed his condition as malarial fever.

A few days later, another Finnish crewman, Haparanta by name, also became ill with malarial fever. A third crew member also complained of feeling ill, but not as severely. The captain prescribed some remedies to help the sick crew members, and they were allowed to walk the deck to get fresh air. A short time later, Granquiss went missing and the crew were unable to locate him on the ship.

Captain Hoegh concluded that the sick crew member must have deliberately jumped from the ship, taking his own life, as the fine weather that day made an accidental fall overboard unlikely. Around 7:00 pm, Captain Hoegh discovered the other sick Finnish crew member was also missing. A search turned up no evidence of him. It was concluded that the malaria had caused both men to become delirious and jump overboard, and Captain Hoegh ordered the crew to keep a close watch on the man with the less severe fever.

Lady Elizabeth eventually arrived at Newcastle New South Wales and filed a report with authorities. A consul from Norway named H. C. Langwill held an official inquiry.

== Final years ==
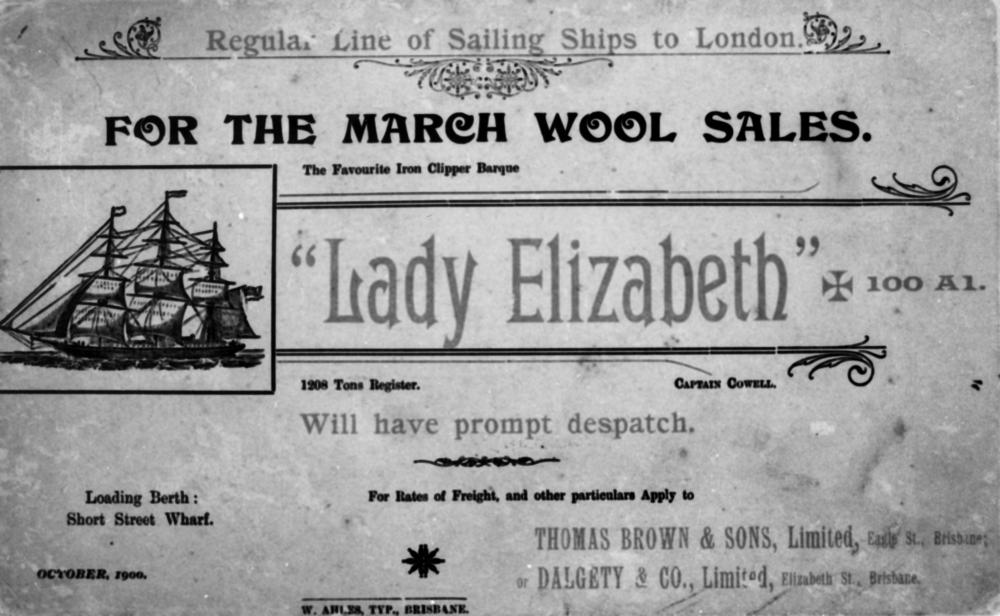
An ad placed in October 1900 for Lady Elizabeth.

On 4 December 1912, Lady Elizabeth left Vancouver bound for Delagoa Bay, Mozambique, with a shipment of lumber. The ship encountered severe weather halfway through the voyage and was damaged just off Cape Horn. Four crew members were lost overboard, along with the ship's two boats and part of her deck cargo. She also sustained damage to the deck fittings, wheel, moorings, and other parts of the ship.

Captain Hoegh ordered the ship to the nearest port for repairs. Lady Elizabeth altered course for Stanley, Falkland Islands. 15 miles (24 km) north of Port Stanley, Lady Elizabeth struck Uraine Rock just off Volunteer Point and suffered a 6-foot (1.8 m) break in the hull and keel along with a 1-foot (30 cm) hole. The ship began to sink but was able to get to Port Stanley for repairs. After she was examined, Lady Elizabeth was condemned (declared unseaworthy) because of the damage.

In June 1913, she was condemned and converted into a coal hulk. She was sold to the Crown Receiver of Wrecks, Falkland Islands for £1,000. Lady Elizabeth remained stationed there until 17 February 1936 when her mooring lines broke during a storm and she drifted to where she now lies in Whalebone Cove in Stanley Harbour.

== Current status ==
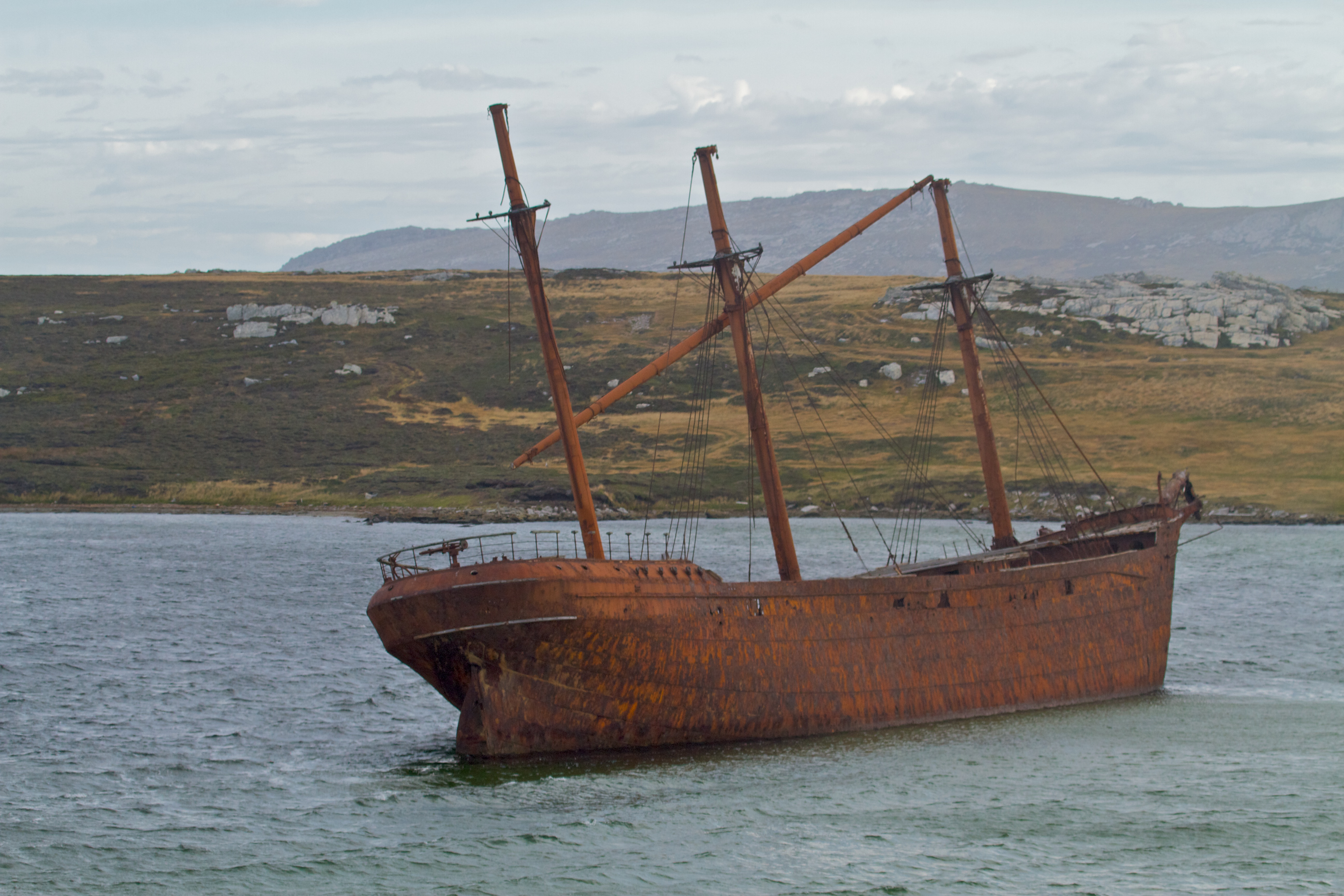
Lady Elizabeth in 2012.

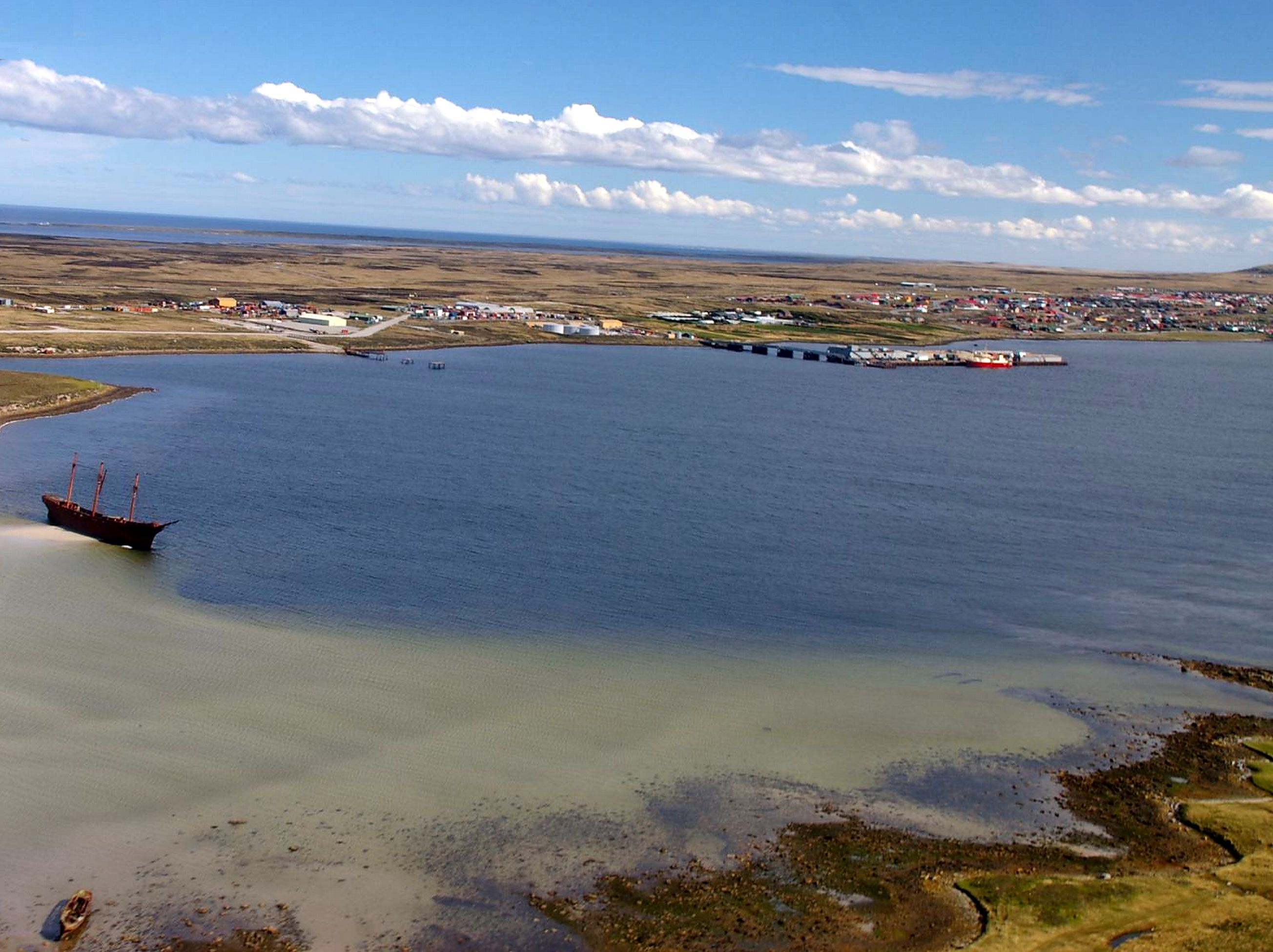
Lady Elizabeth can be seen on the left in this 2007 photo of the harbour.

Lady Elizabeth is still intact and partially beached in Whalebone Cove. The ship has been reported to rock back and forth during high tides from the pounding waves. Many of the ship's accessories are still attached to Lady Elizabeth including the main crank for the anchor, the davits that would hold the two lifeboats, part of the crow's nest, part of the spiral staircase, and most of her wooden decking. However, most of the ship is suffering severe rust and the keel has started to rust away leaving large holes. During high tide, the bottom of the ship is flooded. There are still sections of paint on the inside of the ship. Some of the iron rivets have rusted away causing the starboard bulkhead to spring out.

In June 1984, the owner assessed the damage to Lady Elizabeth. Using original reports from the assessment made on the damage in 1913, they found the foot-long hole in the keel and reported that this was indeed the reason the ship would not stay afloat. However, if Lady Elizabeth was towed for repairs in drydock, she could sail again. Unfortunately, there is no dry dock in Port Stanley.

Since coming to rest in Whalebone Cove, the poop deck quarters have been removed from all wood and vandalized. The rudder of the ship is still intact but showing severe corrosion and is turned to port with the steering gears still intact but also corroded. The ship's wheel is missing. The original anchor has not been located; however, it is believed to be buried where Lady Elizabeth was used as a coal hulk. Plans were made by the Crown Receiver of Wrecks to salvage Lady Elizabeth and convert her into a floating museum. Due to a lack of funding, however, the project was never completed.

In the winter of 2008, the ship's bowsprit broke during a storm. The Falkland Islands Museum & National Trust has discussed removing the bowsprit.

== See also ==
- Lady Elizabeth (1869)
- Stanley, Falkland Islands
- Falkland Islands Museum
- State Library of South Australia
- National Library of Australia
