= Rottnest ship graveyard =

Ship disposal site off Rottnest Island

The Rottnest ship graveyard is a ship graveyard and dump site located off Rottnest Island, Western Australia. The graveyard is located south-west of Rottnest Island: older records identify it as a 11-kilometre-diameter (7 mi) area centred on 32°04′S 115°20′E, while a 1996 report placed the site between the coordinates of 32°00′S 115°10′E and 32°05′S 115°23′E. The seabed in this area rests between 50 and 200 metres (160 and 660 ft) below sea level. It has been used for the disposal of obsolete ships since 1910. After World War II, the graveyard was also used for the disposal of Lend-Lease vehicles and aircraft.

As of 2006, the wrecks of 47 historically significant vessels are known to have been sunk in the Rottnest graveyard.

In 2025, the Dutch submarine HNLMS K XI was found southeast of the graveyard by the technical diving group Wrecksploration. Divers Andrew Oakeley, David Jackson and Patrick Morrison located the wreck at a depth of around 40 metres (130 ft), and it is now a recreational dive site.

== See also ==
- Rottnest Island shipwrecks, for shipwrecks close to the island's shore
