= Lady Forrest (pilot boat) =

Preserved pilot boat of Fremantle, Western Australia

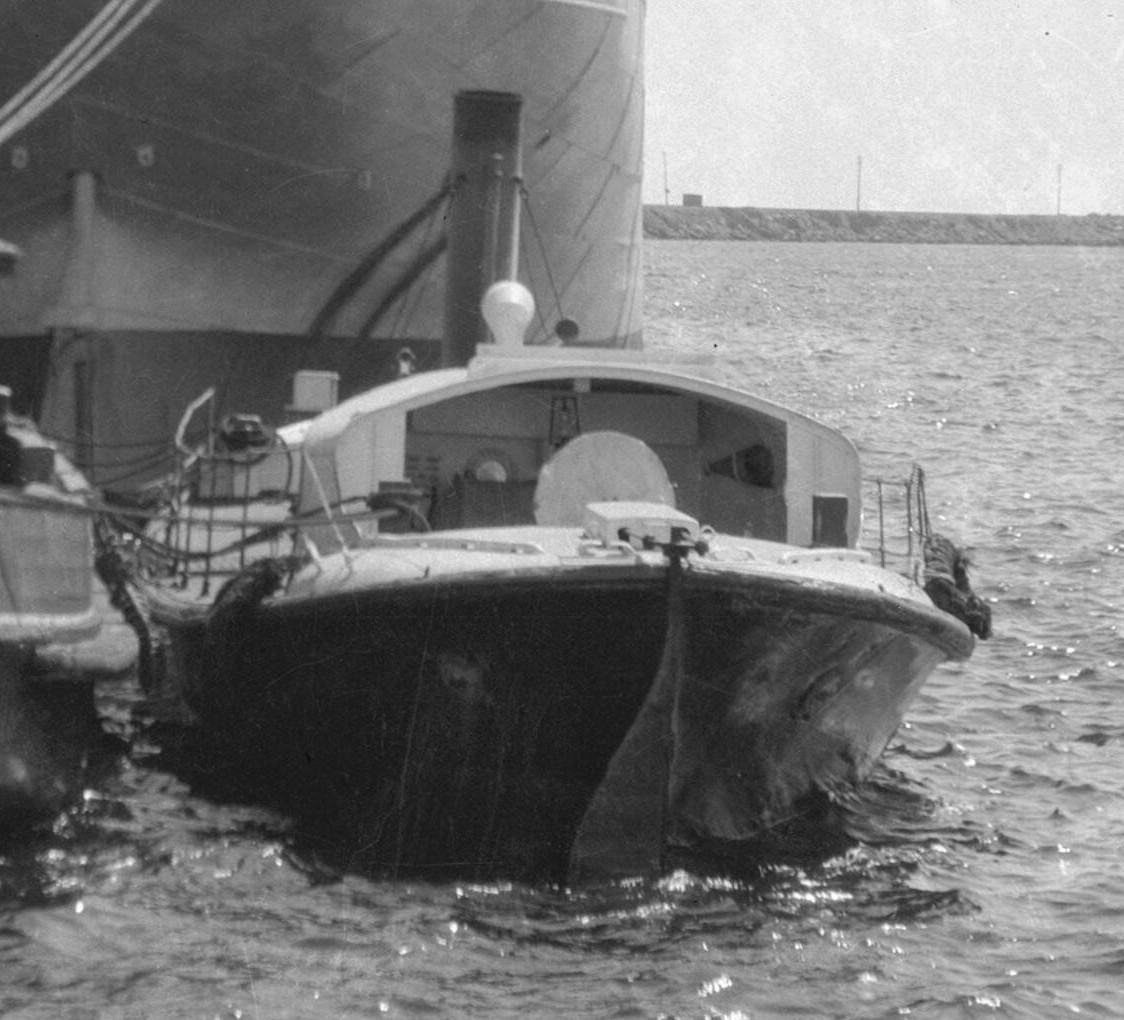
- Lady Forrest in Fremantle Harbour in 1924

History

Australia
- Name: Lady Forrest
- Namesake: Margaret Forrest
- Operator: Fremantle Harbour Trust
- Port of registry: Fremantle
- Builder: J Samuel White
- Laid down: 1902
- Commissioned: August 1903
- Decommissioned: 1967
- Identification: Vessel No. HV000617
- Fate: Preserved

General characteristics
- Type: Pilot boat
- Tonnage: 31.49 GRT
- Length: 17.23 m (56.5 ft)
- Beam: 4.6 m (15 ft)
- Height: 1.93 m (6 ft)
- Draught: 3.8 ft (1 m)
- Propulsion: Gray Marine diesel engine (formerly steam-powered)

Lady Forrest is a preserved pilot boat used in Fremantle Harbour from 1903 to 1967. It is currently displayed in the WA Maritime Museum in Fremantle, Australia.

== History ==
Lady Forrest was ordered by the Harbour and Light Department for use by the newly created Fremantle Harbour Trust, replacing the Rottnest-Fremantle pilot Atlantic, which became a fishing boat, and an insufficient earlier pilot, Pelican, built in 1900. Atlantic and other pilots were replaced upon a state inquiry into pilot and coastal services after two major tragedies involving the wrecking of Carlisle Castle and City of York in 1899 with a combined death toll of 17 people.

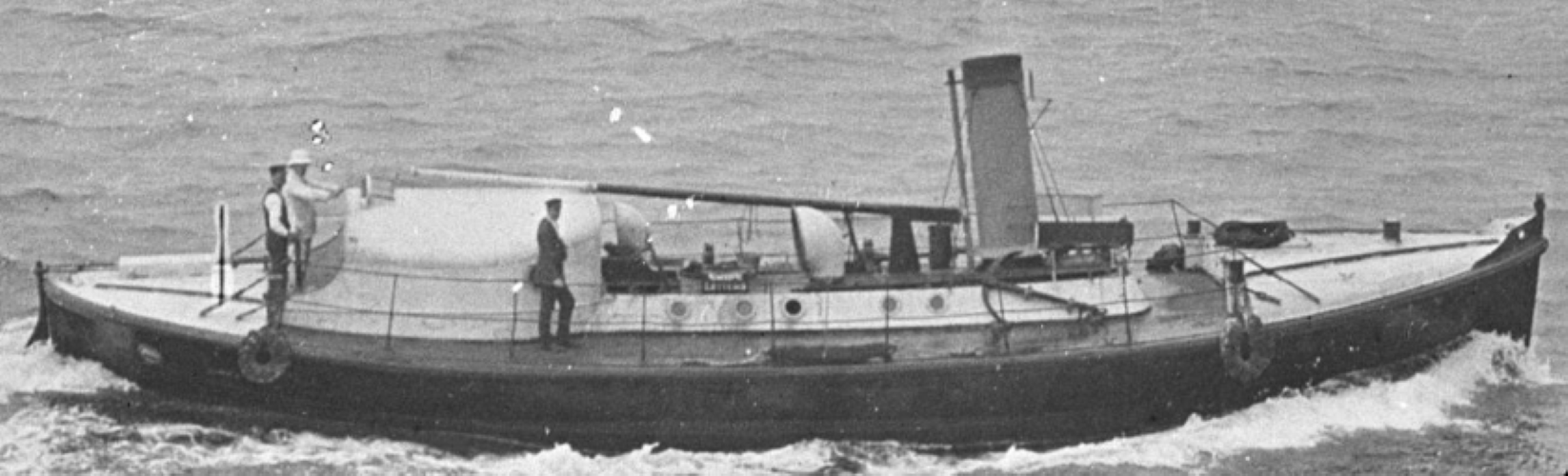
Lady Forrest in Fremantle Harbour, c. 1910

The new pilot boat was laid down in 1902 with designs by W. Tregarthen Douglass inspired by notable lifeboat designer James Peake. Its hull was designed to be the exact distance between the crests of two waves. Lady Forrest was named after Margaret Forrest, wife of Premier of Western Australia John Forrest, and built by J Samuel White of East Cowes, Isle of Wight in England with a steam engine built by White-Foster. It was delivered on board SS Fifeshire, and entered service in August 1903. One of its earliest captains was Macfarlane during which it was berthed at Victoria Quay, it was overhauled almost every third month at North Fremantle.

Immigrants arriving in Western Australia were greeted by the State Labour Bureau headed by Auber Neville aboard the Lady Forrest.

In August 1942 it had the brass conning tower installed from the Dutch submarine HNLMS K VIII which had been decommissioned and was later scuttled in Cockburn Sound. When HMAS Dalgoma broke free of its anchors and collided with the coal hulk Samuel Plimsoll resulting in its sinking in 1945 the Lady Forrest took depth soundings to find deeper water. In 1947 the White-Foster steam engine was replaced by a Gray Marine diesel engine from General Motors; it underwent another thorough overhaul in 1953.

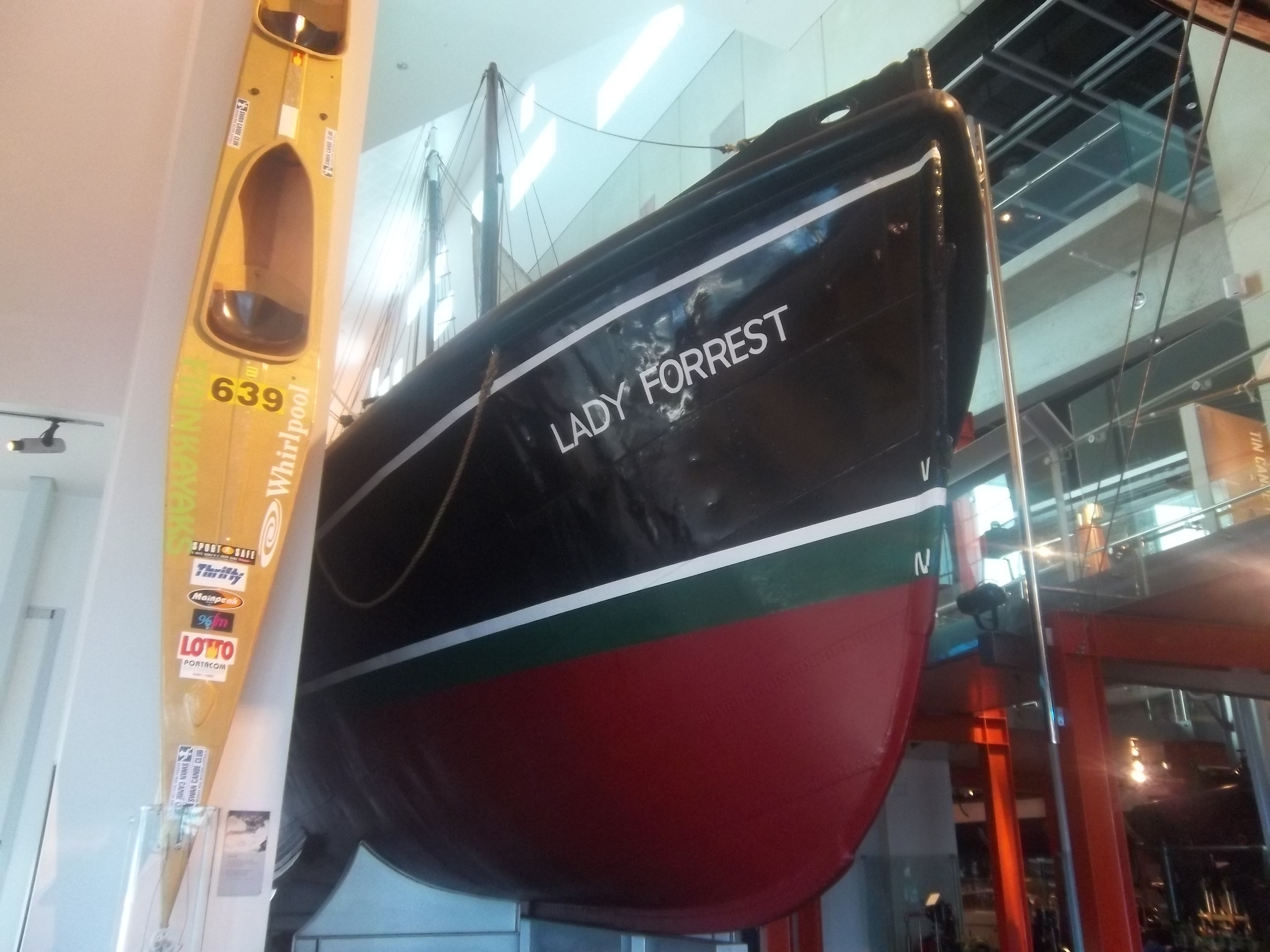
Lady Forrest displayed in the WA Maritime Museum, Elizabeth Quay in January 2021

Following the commissioning of a new pilot boat, MV Lady Gairdner, in 1959, Lady Forrest was transferred to handle customs and immigration officers; in 1960 all Fremantle pilots received VHF international maritime radio telephones. Lady Forrest was decommissioned in 1967 having completed 64 years of service. On 16 December 1970 it was donated to the WA Maritime Museum, being restored various times, most recently in 2001; it went on display in the current museum building in 2013.

Forrest Landing where Captain Fremantle is said to have first landed is named after the pilot boat, Lady Forrest.
