= Lady Elizabeth (1869) =

Ship wrecked off the coast of Western Australia

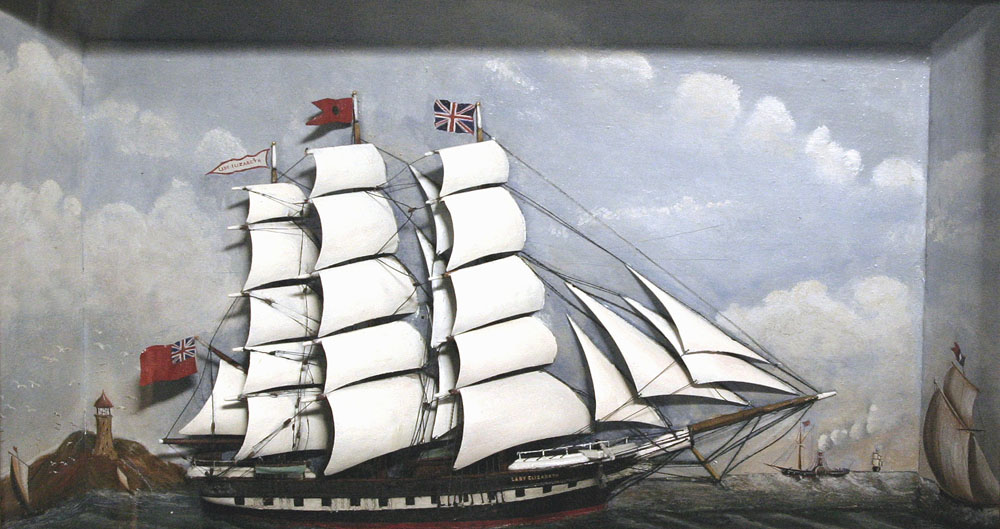
- Sailors art diorama of a full rigged Lady Elizabeth

History

United Kingdom
- Name: Lady Elizabeth
- Owner: John Wilson (Messrs Wilson & Oliver)
- Port of registry: Great Britain
- Route: Between London & Fremantle, Western Australia
- Builder: Robert Thompson Jr. Southwick, Sunderland, United Kingdom
- Yard number: 40
- Launched: 26 June 1869
- Maiden voyage: 1869
- Fate: Struck a reef at Dyer Island near Fremantle, 1878
- Notes: Official ID #60966

General characteristics
- Class & type: Passenger and cargo Barque
- Type: Composite hull, Three-Masted Barque rig
- Tonnage: 658 Tons
- Length: 48.7 m (160 ft)
- Beam: 9.3 m (31 ft)
- Depth: 5.5 m (18 ft 1 in)
- Decks: 1
- Propulsion: Sail

Lady Elizabeth wrecksite
- Interactive map of Lady Elizabeth wrecksite
- Coordinates: 32°01′8.76″S 115°32′51.00″E

Lady Elizabeth was a British ship built in 1869 by Robert Thompson Jr. of Sunderland. Robert Thompson Jr. was one of the sons of Robert Thompson Sr. who owned and operated the family ran shipyard J. L. Thompson & Sons. Thompson Jr. eventually left the family business in 1854 to start his own shipbuilding business in Southwick, Sunderland. She was 658 tons and was classified as a barque cargo sailing ship with one deck and three masts. She had a keel and outer planking made from American rock elm and a fore end made from English elm. The stem was made of teak and English oak with an iron floor as the deck. The ship also had copper and iron fastings. The ships was also registered in London under the name Wilson & Co. Messrs Wilson & Co. was based out of Sydney, Australia. The ship carried a comparative classification under American Lloyd's as "First class-third grade" (First Class under British Lloyd's)

== Service history ==
Lady Elizabeth was owned by shipping merchant John Wilson and made her primary shipping runs between Fremantle, Western Australia and London. Sometimes Lady Elizabeth would make other runs to Chinese ports in the Asian Indian region to deliver timber. There is speculation that Lady Elizabeth was named after John Wilson's mother Elizabeth Wilson. She was commanded by Captain Edward W. Cobbett and after 1875, by Captain Thomas S. Scott.

== Final years ==
Lady Elizabeth was only in service for nine years when she met her fate on 30 June 1878, while she was on charter for Messrs Shenton and Monger to carry a cargo of lead ore and 611 tons of sandalwood to Shanghai. Captain Scott encountered rough weather around Rottnest Island and the ship was driven south because of the difficulties in acquiring navigational headings. On the morning of 30 June, Captain Scott ordered the crew to head back to Fremantle about 55 kilometres away to south-south-east. During the heavy storm, one man was lost overboard but the crew could not launch any boats to rescue the sailor because of the weather.

Captain Scott sighted what he believed to be Parker Point (the southernmost tip of Rottnest Island) and ordered his crew to adjust the ship's heading towards Fremantle through Rottnest Island's southern channel. Moments later, Lady Elizabeth struck a reef in Bickley Bay. The ship lost control and swung to the south when Captain Scott ordered the port anchor be dropped. At 10:30 pm, Lady Elizabeth began listing to starboard and the water started coming over the decks. Captain Nash, a pilot on Rottnest Island saw the blue distress signal flares but was unable to reach Lady Elizabeth due to the weather. He was forced to wait out the storm. By morning, weather conditions improved to launch a rescue of Lady Elizabeth's crew. Over the course of the next few months, the sandalwood that was stored in the ship's cargo hold broke free and washed up on shore. Most of the cargo was scattered between Rottnest Island and Bunbury.

Nearby locals made substantial gains salvaging the cargo from the lost Lady Elizabeth. It is believed that the sailor who was lost overboard during the storm was the only casualty.

== Outcome ==
An inquiry into the disaster found that Captain Scott was not liable for the sinking and no charges against him were filed. However, during the inquiry, it was noted that Captain Scott 'made use of expressions which were both unbecoming and amounted to gross contempt'. Afterwards, he displayed regret for the use of his expressions and apologized to the Court. The court inquiry was held by L. Worsley Clifton, Collector of Customs; John F. Stone, J.P.; and W. E. Archdeacon, Staff Commander, R.N., Admiralty Surveyor. Captain Thomas Scott retained his certificate of captain.

The hull, iron ore, and sandalwood that were salvaged was sold at auction for £1,039. The sandalwood that was lost was insured for £5,000.

After the sinking of Lady Elizabeth, Robert Thompson & Sons of Sunderland under J.L. Thompson and Sons company, began construction of another Lady Elizabeth, completed in 1879, just one year after the sinking of the first Lady Elizabeth.

== Other events ==
Shortly after the sinking of Lady Elizabeth, Ah Cum, a Chinese steward, was charged with larceny. Ah Cum did plead guilty to stealing personal effects and cargo from Captain Scott. The items included one pound of corn flour, a pound of tea, two dozen red herrings, two bottles of brandy, two bottle of wine, a pint of rum, two cans of jam, and tobacco. Ah Cum had apparently sold the merchandise to other immigrants sailing on Lady Elizabeth. He was sentenced to 3 years gaol.

Two more immigrants were also charged with larceny on the last voyage of Lady Elizabeth. Robert Young & George Lench both pleaded guilty and were sentenced to ten months in prison. The two immigrants were later acquitted.

Two more immigrants were taken into custody for breaching the cargo when they arrived in Fremantle on 12 March 1878. Their outcome is not determined.

== Documented arrival and departures ==
Meaning of column A or D (For Arriving or Departing):

- A Arriving
- D Departing
- S Last spotted

Lady Elizabeth destinations
Date	Year	A or D	From	To	Secondary date	Passengers	Cargo
8 March	1870	A		Fremantle, Western Australia			
October	1870	S		Shanghai, China			
March	1871	S		New York, United States			
June	1872	S		London, England			
April	1873	S		New York, United States			
October	1874	S		New York, United States			
24 December	1874	A	Port Adelaide, South Australia		7 December	Mr. J. Hicks	22 pkgs., J. Cookworthy; 35 pkgs., order
12 June	1875	A	Gravesend, England			Rev. Henry Laurence, the newly appointed Church of England chaplain for Champion Bay, along with his wife and family. Also 147 Government and nominated immigrants	
13 July	1875	D	Fremantle, Western Australia	Champion Bay, Western Australia		Mrs. Laurence and daughter. Rev. J. B. Atkins, Messrs. Harvey and Kenny, and eight miners and their families (20)	Cargo-Sundry pkgs, merchandise (part of the original cargo iron from London); 8 pkgs. spirits (under bond); 51 bags potatoes, 100 hides beer, 50 bags sugar, and sundries.
July	1875	S		London, United States			^{Possible confusion between Western Australian Newspaper telegram and Lloyd's Register}
June	1877	S	New York, United States				
15 December	1877	D	Gravesend, England	Gage's Road, Western Australia	12 March 1878	Immigrants	Ship's cook died two days before reaching port.
12 March	1878	A	London, England	Fremantle, Western Australia		80 Immigrants	
25 March	1878	D	Fremantle, Western Australia	Shanghai, China		Miss Scott	Sandalwood, iron ore

== Current status ==
Lady Elizabeth was discovered in 1969 in 7 metres of water on Porpoise Bay near Rottnest Island and Dyer Island. The bell from Lady Elizabeth was raised and donated to the Western Australian Maritime Museum where it is currently displayed. The wreck has become a common site for divers to view the wreck however; no artifacts can be removed under the Historic Shipwrecks Act 1976.

== Notes and other information ==
- According to the Western Australian Maritime Museum, There was another three-masted barque named Lady Elizabeth that visited Fremantle, Western Australia that was built in Sunderland England in 1852. (Official ID: 25973) That ship was built for C. Tyler who also registered the ship in London. Although they are similar in design, there is no relation between this ship and Lady Elizabeth (1869) & (1879).
- After stepping down as captain of Lady Elizabeth, Cobbett eventually became captain of the steamer Saxon Monarch under the British flag in 1880.

== See also ==
- Rottnest Island shipwrecks
