= Wadjemup Lighthouse =

Lighthouse on Rottnest Island, Western Australia

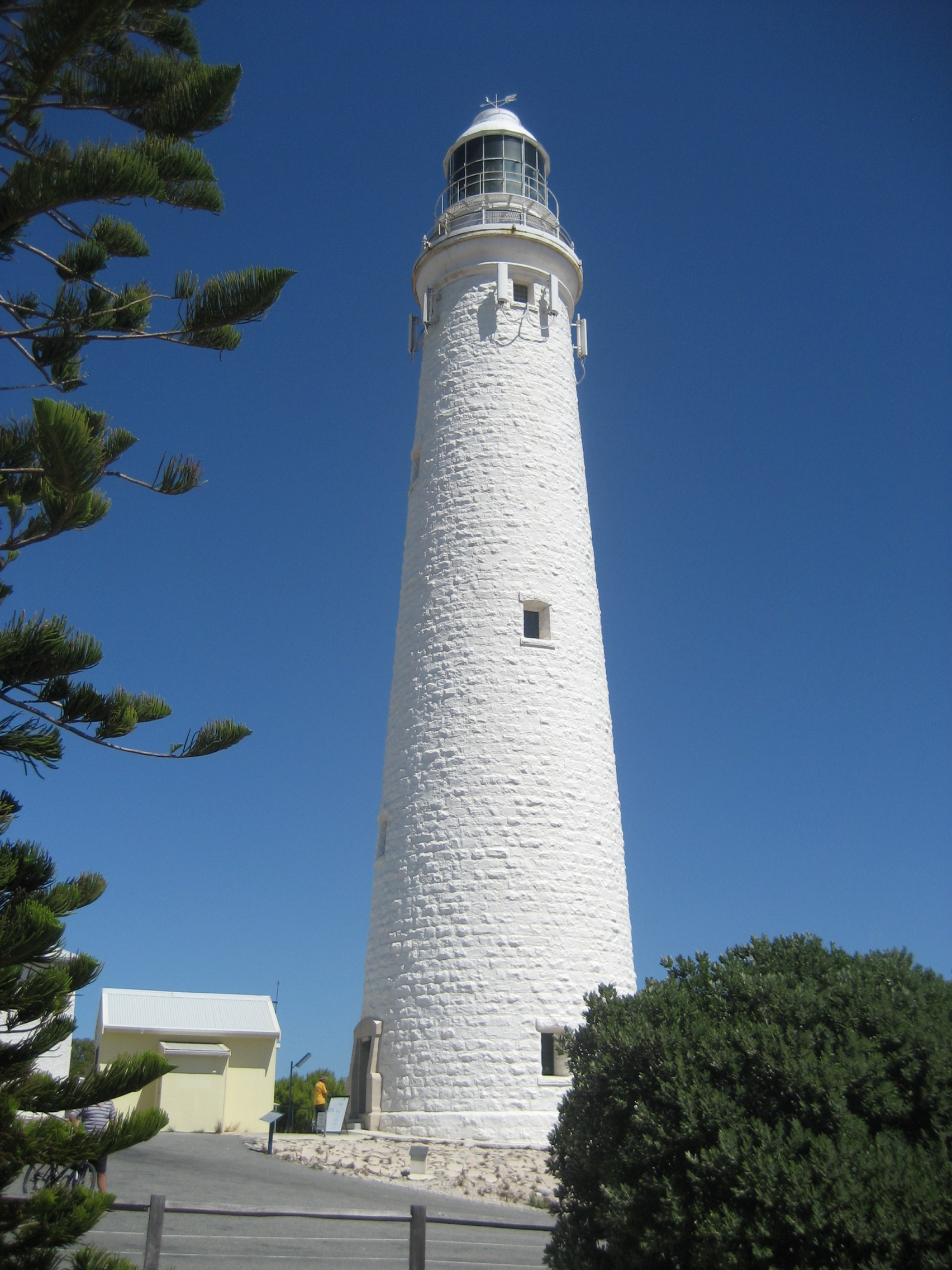
- Location: Rottnest Island, Western Australia
- Coordinates: 32°00′27″S 115°30′14″E

Tower
- Constructed: 1896
- Construction: limestone
- Automated: 1986
- Height: 38.7 metres (127 ft)
- Shape: tapered cylindrical tower with balcony and lantern
- Markings: white tower and lantern
- Operator: Australian Maritime Safety Authority
- Heritage: State Registered Place

Light
- First lit: 1896
- Focal height: 80.5 metres (264 ft)
- Intensity: 1,300,000 cd
- Range: 26 nautical miles (48 km; 30 mi)
- Characteristic: Fl W 7.5s.

Western Australia Heritage Register
- Designated: 31 December 1993
- Reference no.: 3254

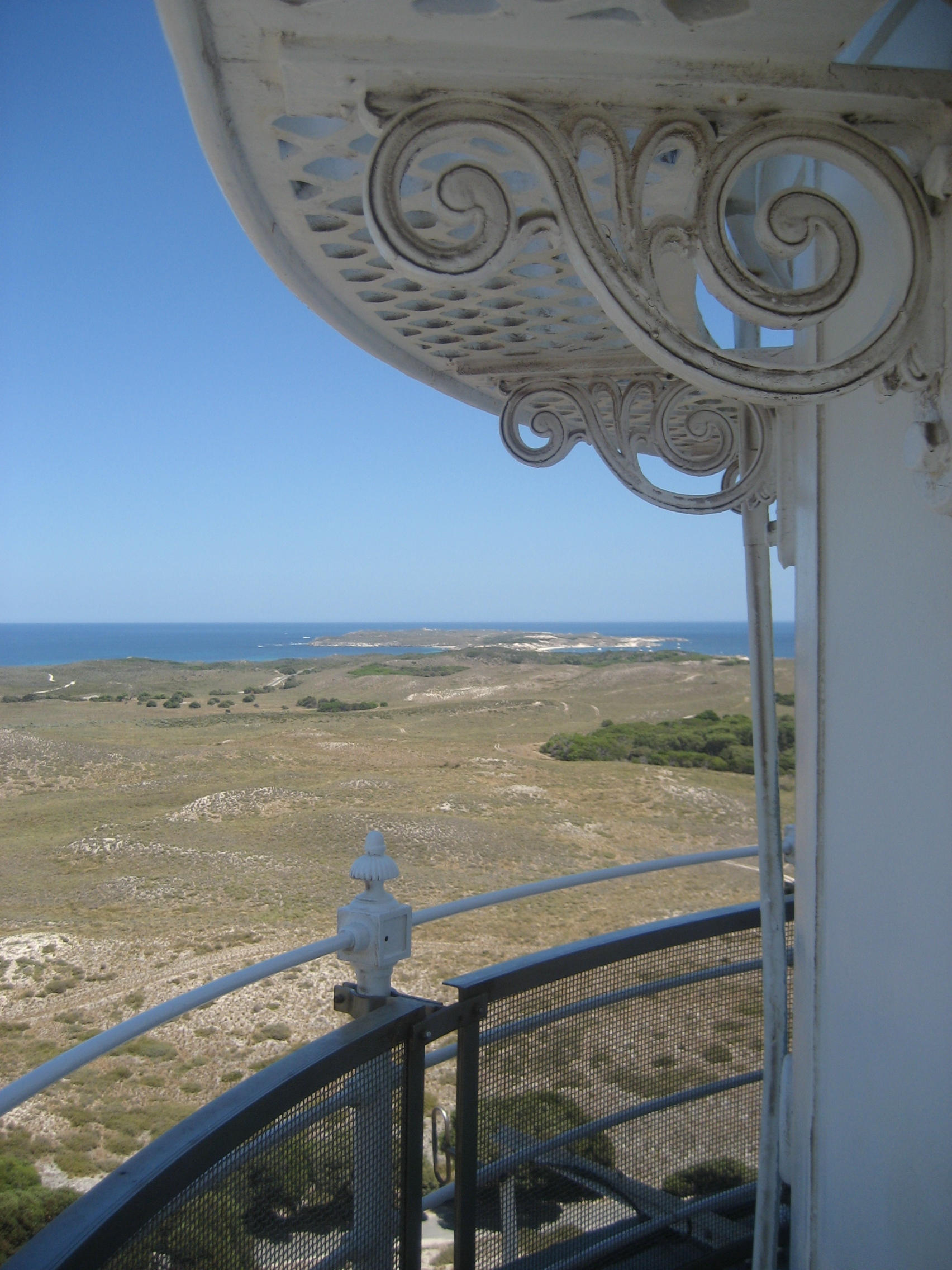
Looking West towards Narrow Neck and Cape Vlamingh from the lighthouse viewing platform

Completed in 1849, the original 20-metre (66 ft) Wadjemup Lighthouse (also known as Rottnest Island Light Station) was Western Australia's first stone lighthouse and was built to provide a safer sailing passage for ships to Fremantle Harbour and the Swan River Colony.

A second and larger replacement tower was built on the same site in 1896. It is the fourth oldest extant lighthouse in Western Australia and was Australia's first rotating beam lighthouse. A shipwreck that was partly caused by poor communications and misunderstood signals from the lighthouse prompted the construction of Bathurst Lighthouse on the island in 1900.

== Location selection and obelisk ==
Rottnest Island is the largest and northernmost of several islands near the Port of Fremantle. It is 19 kilometres (12 mi) from the mouth of the Swan River and is generally the first land sighted by ships arriving from the west. The island is 11 kilometres (6.8 mi) long and 4.5 kilometres (2.8 mi) at its widest point, with a total land area of 19 square kilometres (7.3 sq mi). The lighthouse site is at the highest point of the island, on Wadjemup Hill, with the tower base 45 metres (148 ft) above sea level. It is 4 kilometres (2.5 mi) west of the Thomson Bay settlement and about 2 kilometres (1.2 mi) south-west of the Geordie Bay settlement.

Between 1837 and 1843, Commander John Clements Wickham led an expedition in HMS Beagle with Lieutenant John Lort Stokes to chart sections of the Australian coastline. During the voyage, Fremantle was visited seven times and in the course of one of these visits on 25 March 1840, Stokes wrote in his journal:

We moved the ship to Rottnest Island, to collect a little material for the chart and select a hill for the site of a lighthouse. The one we chose lies towards the South east end of the island bearing N76°W (true) twelve miles and a quarter from the Fremantle gaol.

In October 1840, Surveyor-General John Septimus Roe, together with Wickham and Stokes published Sailing Directions for the Navigation About Rottnest Island. The document appeared in the Government Gazette and included:

Rottnest Island ... may now be distinguished from the mainland and Garden Island by a white obelisk, 15ft in height, with a pole in the middle, of the same length, which has recently been erected on its highest part near the centre of the island. This sea-mark, being elevated about 157ft above sea level, may be seen from a ship's deck in clear weather at the distance of 7 or 8 leagues, and will shortly give place to a lighthouse of greater elevation. Its position, according to HMS Beagle, is lat. 32d 0m 14s South, long. 115d 26m 6s East.

== Original tower ==
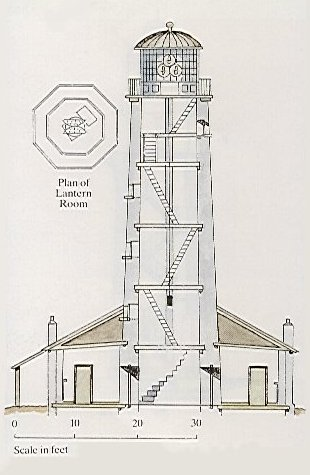
Plan of the 1840s lighthouse

Stokes returned to Fremantle on Beagle in April 1843 and wrote:

In the forenoon of the 23rd we saw the lighthouse of Rottenest [sic]; and regarded it with great interest, as the work of the [Aboriginals ...] imprisoned at the island.

Rottnest had been used as a prison for Aboriginal people since 1838.

Superintendent of Public Works Henry Trigg designed the first lighthouse and laid the foundation stone in January 1842. Perth builder Bayley Maycock oversaw construction of the tower at a cost of £500 and used labour provided by the prisoners and locally quarried limestone. Construction seemed to be quite protracted for reasons which are unclear—possibly because of resistance by the Prisoner's Superintendent Henry Vincent, who disliked outside meddling on the island.

The first keeper, Samuel Thomas, was appointed on 18 January 1849—two years before the light was lit. Thomas's duties initially included operating a system of signalling using flags and flares to indicate the arrival of ships. Different signals and flag combinations indicated ships to the north or south of the island and these were monitored from a pilot's lookout at Bathurst Point on the north-eastern extremity of the island and then relayed to Arthur Head at Fremantle. Four flagpoles were built at the lighthouse for signalling. The flags were about 9 feet (2.7 m) square. When confirmation of a ship's arrival was received, the lookout man at Arthur Head raised a blue flag for the information of Fremantle residents.

Vincent wrote to Colonial Secretary Henry Bland on 25 August 1849, that "... the Tower of the Litehous is all finesh...". The conclusion of construction coincided with the closure of the island prison establishment and the removal of inmates back to the mainland. The Aboriginal prison population did return however, between 1855 and 1931.

The tower's completed height was 3 metres (10 ft) shorter than the design, and commissioning was finally completed in 1851 when the revolving lamp and clockwork mechanism were fitted. Unusually for the period, as most lighthouse lamps and mechanisms came from England, the machinery for the revolving catoptric light was designed and built in Fremantle. Assistant Surveyor-General Augustus Gregory designed the mechanism which comprised two sets of three oil-burning lamps, each with a silvered parabolic reflector. In 1850, a contract was let to Alfred Carson to construct the revolving apparatus. The official opening on 1 June 1851 coincided with the twenty-second anniversary of the Colony and the opening of another lighthouse at Arthur Head.

The light was visible for 18 nautical miles (33 km; 21 mi) and had a characteristic five-second flash followed by a 55-second eclipse. The entire apparatus rotated once every two minutes. It was operated by a clockwork mechanism and the lamps consumed 3 gallons of coconut oil per week. In 1862, colza oil, and later in the century, kerosene were used as fuel. The octagonal lantern was 3.4 metres (11 ft) high, and glazed with 160 panes of 3/8 inch (9.5 mm) thick glass.

The Argus reported on 31 July 1851:

The light will consist of two groups of three powerful lamps each; the whole revolving once in two minutes, and showing a flash of light of five seconds' duration every minute, with intervals of 55 seconds of darkness. The centre of the light is 197 feet above high water level, and at the height of 18-feet may be seen in clear weather at a distance of 7 leagues.

The now demolished lighthouse keeper's quarters and a storeroom were constructed nearby.

Thomas Carter succeeded Samuel Thomas as keeper in January 1853. The following year, on hearing that a vacancy for the keeper's position had occurred, John Duffield Senior wrote to the Colonial Secretary on 17 January asking that his son Samuel be considered. Governor Charles Fitzgerald approved Samuel Duffield's appointment as the third Rottnest lighthouse keeper the following day. Duffield, his wife and four children took up residence with an initial pay of £44 per year rising to £88 per year at his retirement in 1879 with a pension of £33 6s 8d, equivalent to A$5,547.76 in 2022. Duffield was the longest-serving lighthouse keeper at Rottnest. The lighthouse keeper lived an isolated existence, being required to be on duty at all hours. This would have been exacerbated by the absence until 1866 of a permanent road between the Thomson Bay settlement and the lighthouse.

In 1863 the Admiralty issued its first publication of the west coast of Australia in The Australia Directory Vol. 3. The light was described as revolving and flashing for five seconds in every minute, and that it could be seen for 20 nautical miles (37 km; 23 mi) on a clear day at an elevation of 18 feet (5.5 m). As to signalling, The Directory stated:

On the approach of a vessel by day, the lightkeeper makes a signal to the pilot stationed at the north-east extreme of the island [Bathurst Point], showing whether the vessel is about to enter the channel North or South of Rottnest Island., the pilot will then proceed onboard. A vessel arriving at Rottnest Island at night, and requiring a pilot, should show her position by lights, blue lights or rockets, or by firing guns, when the lightkeeper will give notice to the pilot, who will board the vessel as quickly as possible.

Repairs to the tower were made in 1879 and a new lens from England was ordered the following year. These works totalling £100 were approved in the Legislative Council in 1880. In March 1881 a new first order dioptric lamp was fitted and in 1887 a locally made revolving apparatus was installed. However, the Harbour and Light Department described the light as being "behind the times". A first-order holophotal lantern with an estimated cost of £3,900 was ordered in 1891. The same year £6,000 was placed in the Government's budget estimates for a new lighthouse, which had been under consideration for some time.

== New tower ==
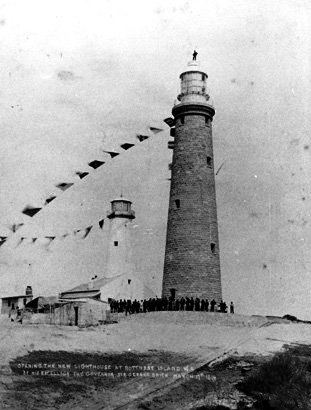
Official opening of the second lighthouse on 17 March 1896. The original and smaller lighthouse adjacent was demolished soon afterwards.

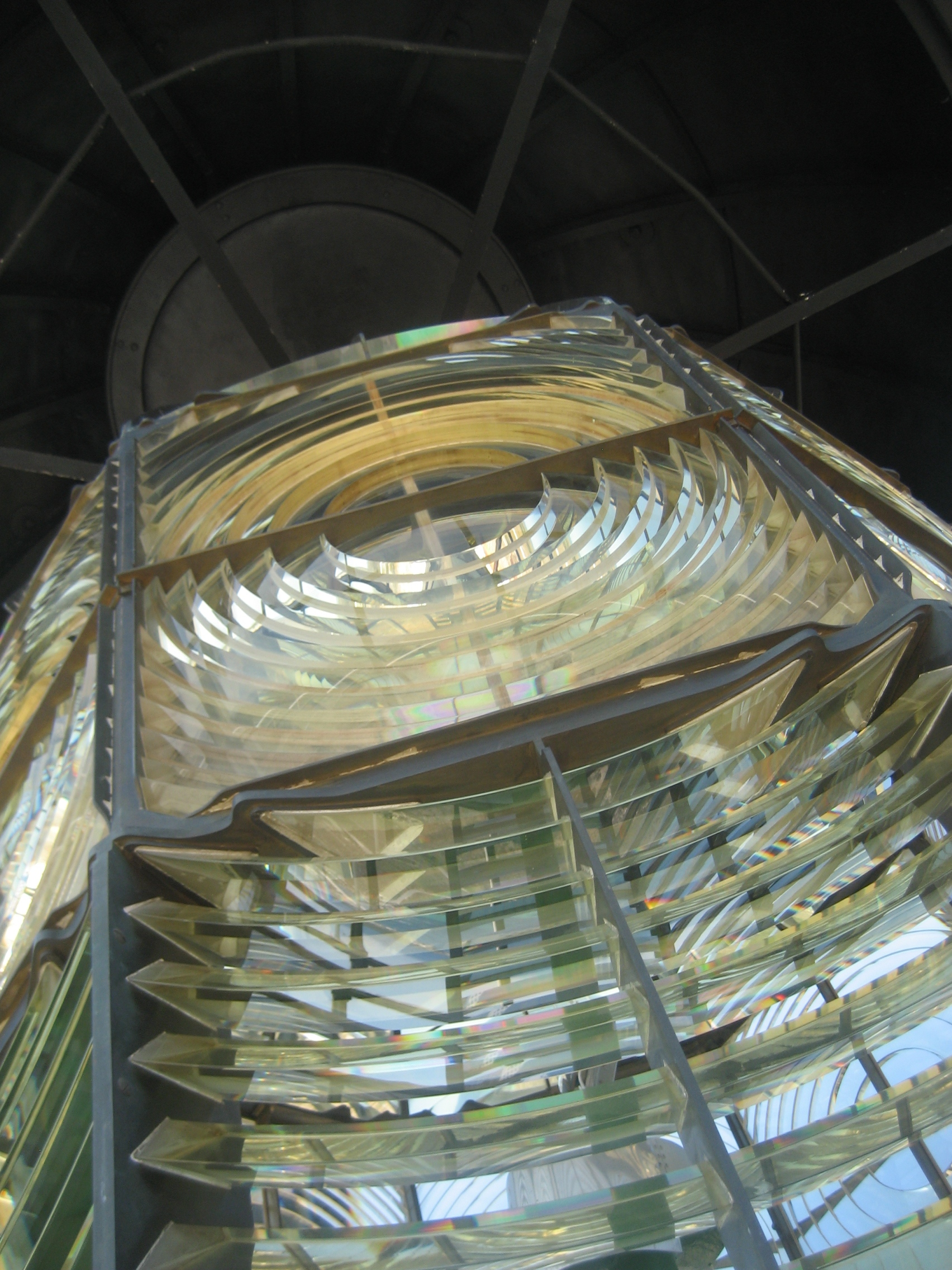
A section of the lens

Tenders for the new tower were accepted in October 1894 for £3,237 4s. 9d. from Messrs Parker and Rhodes, and construction commenced in March 1895. The foundation stone was laid on 25 April 1895 by the Premier of Western Australia, John Forrest and included the placement of a glass bottle in a niche in the stone, containing newspapers, coins and copies of plans of the new lighthouse. It was designed by British engineer William Douglass with construction overseen by the colony's engineer-in-chief, Charles Yelverton O'Connor. Douglass also designed the Cape Leeuwin Lighthouse, which was built between 1895 and 1896.

Construction of the new 38.7-metre (127 ft) tower alongside the original lighthouse was completed in 1896, and on the occasion of its opening on 17 March The West Australian newspaper reported:

The light is a first order Holophotal Revolving Light of 920 millimetres focal distance constructed by Messrs. Chance Bros. and Coy. Ltd, Birmingham, England, to the order of the government...The pedestal is square and contains the actuating clock with accompanying gearing. Hand rotating gear was also supplied. The clock weighs 5cwt., the rate of descent being 10 feet per second. The clock will run for a period of approximately three hours without rewinding...The optical apparatus consists of eight panels each subtending a horizontal angle of 45 degrees. The vertical angle of the lenses is 57 degrees, of the upper panels 48 degrees and the lower prisms 21 degrees. The upper prisms in each panel number 18, the central lenses 8 and the lower prisms 8. In one panel the lower prisms are omitted for convenience in entering the apparatus...The pressure lamp is of the "Chance" pattern, having a capacity of 12 gallons with suitable gearing. The four burners (three to spare) are of the usual Trinity House old pattern. The candle power of the 6 wick burners gives and average service result per burner of 730 standard candles with 6 wicks in action. The consumption of heavy mineral oil with six wicks in action is 80.3 fluid ounces per hour.

The basement octagon of the tower is 13 metres (43 ft) across and 1.8 metres (5 ft 11 in) thick, being formed from 230 cubic metres (8,100 cu ft) of concrete. The superstructure is 34 metres (112 ft) above this and comprises 760 cubic metres (27,000 cu ft) of hard limestone. The outer diameter is about 9 metres (30 ft) at ground level and the walls are 1.4 metres (4 ft 7 in) thick. At the top of the tower the inner diameter is 3.4 metres (11 ft) and the walls excluding capping are 0.9 metres (2 ft 11 in) thick. The lantern house is 7.6 metres (25 ft) high. Stone for the new tower was transported to the site from a quarry at Nancy Cove, about 1.6 kilometres (1 mi) south-west, along a tramway built for the task.

The light characteristic was initially a flash for 3 seconds and a 17-second eclipse. There being eight lens panels, the apparatus revolved every 2 minutes 40 seconds. The new tower almost doubled the height of the previous one and accommodated a more powerful 45000 candle power lamp which was visible for 23 nautical miles (43 km; 26 mi).

At the opening ceremony the Governor Gerard Smith referred to the lighting of the lamp as "this new light symbolises the progress and vigour of the colony". At the same ceremony, Premier Forrest said:

The lighthouse is not only a light to guide the mariner to our shores but also a magnificent milestone on the road to the progress of the colony ... a symbol to lead the people of the country on to great and noble deeds.

The existing lighthouse keeper's house was built at about the same time and the old tower was demolished a short time after the new tower was commissioned. The head keeper at the time of the opening was William Brown and his assistant keepers were David Mitchinson and David Baird.

In the year ended June 1908 the wick burners were replaced by a Chance incandescent petroleum vapour burner and the light output was increased from 45000 to 200000 candle power. This was increased to 327000 candles in February 1927 and the current mercury float pedestal and clockwork (now electrified) mechanism was installed in March 1929. At the same time, the light characteristic was changed to a 0.4 second flash with a 4.6 second eclipse. The revolution time was thus 40 seconds.

Electrification was done on 15 January 1936 and power increased to 1300000 candles. states that the light was increased to 3000000 candle power in 1936. All other sources consulted state 1300000 candelas and as do almost all first order lighthouses worldwide. The higher figure is therefore assumed to be an error. The light characteristic changed to 0.2 second flash with a 7.3 second eclipse. The apparatus revolution time became one minute.

== City of York incident ==
On 12 July 1899 the lighthouse was involved in a major shipwreck event, when a British owned barque City of York was wrecked off a reef to the north of the island. The ship had sailed from San Francisco with a cargo of timber and was en route to Fremantle when it was seen by the lighthouse keeper at 4:30 p.m. about 30 kilometres (19 mi) distant. Conditions were stormy with blinding rain. The keeper signalled news of the sighting to the head pilot at Thompson Bay who readied himself and his pilot boat to go to the assistance of the ship once it signalled for a pilot.

At 6:45 p.m. the ship had still not signalled for a pilot and the assistant lighthouse keeper challenged the ship by lighting a flare-up at the base of the lighthouse, meaning for the ship to stand off until the pilot had arrived. The captain however mistook the signal as being from a pilot boat itself and that it was the international code signifying that the ship should continue towards it (the pilot boat). He unwittingly sailed straight towards the shallow reefs that surround the island. Eleven men including the captain drowned and the 68-metre (223 ft) 1,167-tonne (1,149-long-ton; 1,286-short-ton) ship was lost.

Another ship, Carlisle Castle, was also lost in the same storm, but on the southern side of the island. At least 24 (and possibly 26, accounts very) were on board and all were drowned. There was no indication of the lighthouse having played a role in its loss.

A second Rottnest lighthouse at Bathurst Point was built in 1900 on the north-east of the island partly in response to the incident, as well as other shipping disasters in the area.

== Other buildings ==
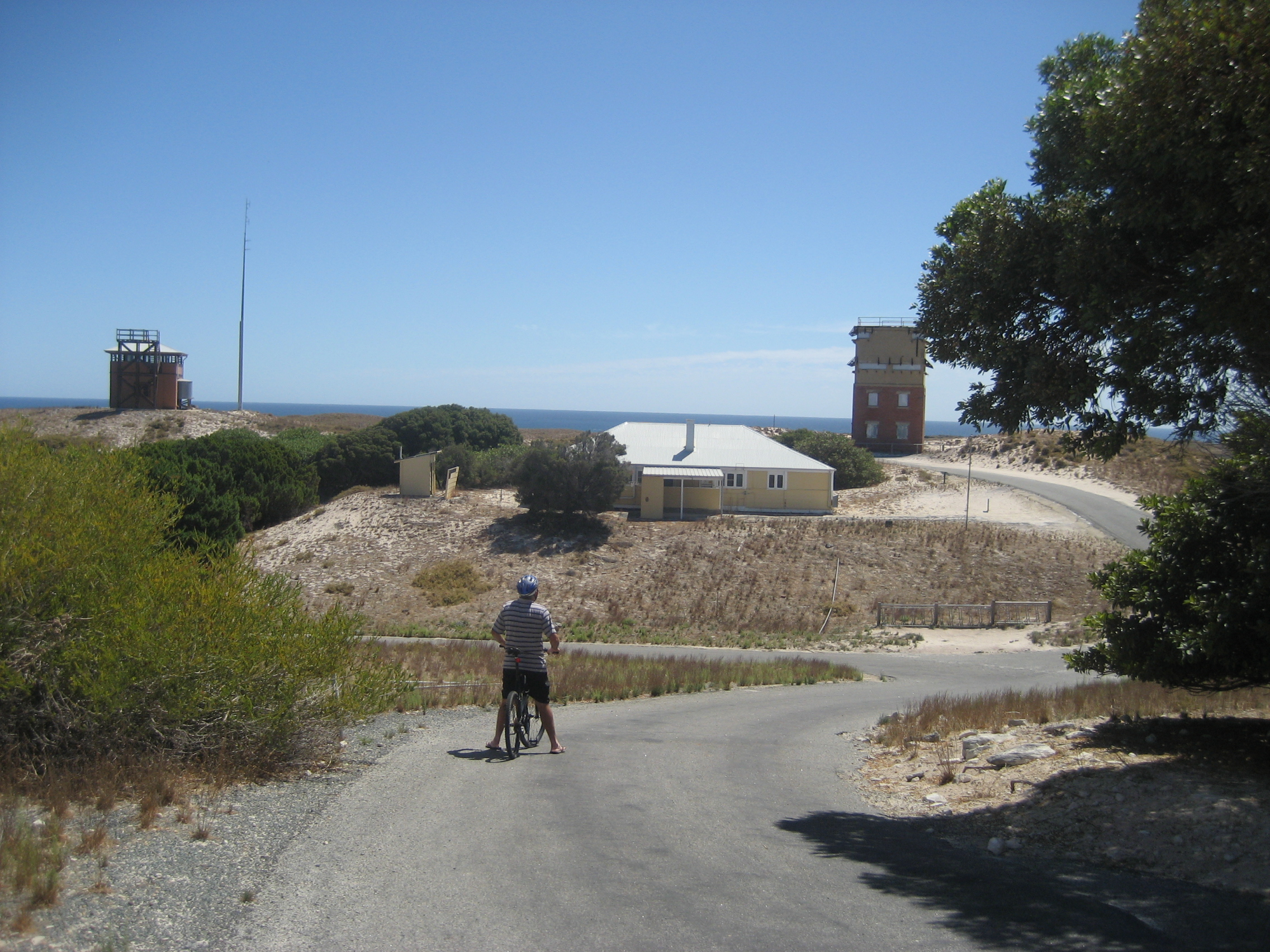
(from left) Signals Building, Women's Barracks and the Battery Observation Post

The lighthouse precinct includes the following extant structures

- Lighthouse tower (1896)
- The foundations of the original 1849 tower in a small stone building adjacent
- 1890s lighthouse keeper's cottage, now used for accommodation unrelated to lighthouse operations
- Battery Observation Post (BOP), built as a lookout during World War II to coordinate aiming and firings from the 6-inch and 12-inch guns at Bickley Battery and Oliver's Battery on the island. Plans for its restoration and opening as a tourist attraction are under consideration.
- Signals Building, associated with the BOP
- Women's Army Barracks, built to house officers and staff who operated the BOP. The building is used nowadays for occasional accommodation for University and other scientific research groups working on the island.

== Tourism and modern operations ==
Wadjemup Lighthouse was converted to automatic operations in November 1986 and is currently operated to the Australian Maritime Safety Authority. The last lighthouse keeper left the island in 1990.

It is a popular tourist site with volunteer guides offering hourly tours of the precinct and to the top of the tower with information on the site's history. There are 155 steps to the top and the tour has views of the coastline around the island and back to the mainland around the Perth metropolitan area.

The lantern is a 3.66 metres (12.0 ft) diameter Chance Brothers device with a 920-millimetre (36 in) focal radius 8-panel catadioptric lens from the same company. It rotates once every 60 seconds on a mercury float pedestal. It is powered by 240-volt electricity from the island's mains supply and has a 2.5kVa diesel backup system.

The light is 80.5 metres (264 ft) above sea level and has a nominal range of 22 nautical miles (41 km; 25 mi) and geographical range of 20 nautical miles (37 km; 23 mi). Its current light characteristic is a single flash of 0.07 seconds every 7.5 seconds with an eclipse of 7.43 seconds.

== Engineering heritage award ==
The lighthouse and signal station received a Historic Engineering Marker from Engineers Australia as part of its Engineering Heritage Recognition Program.

== Sources ==
- Moynihan, John (1988). All the News in a Flash. Rottnest Communications 1829-1979. Telecom Australia and the Institution of Engineers, Australia. ISBN 0-642-12107-9.
- Somerville, William (1966). Rottnest Island in history and legend: its discovery and development, natural beauties, fauna and flora. Rottnest Island Board.
- "Rottnest Island Lighthouse and Signal Station, Bathurst Point, 1848 to 1896". Engineers Australia. 6 April 2010 [1996-09-04].
- "The Wadjemup Lighthouse on Rottnest Island". Lighthouses of Australia. 12 June 2006. Archived from the original on 13 December 2010.
- Rottnest Island Light Station (1896) (PDF) (Report). Heritage Council of Western Australia. 31 December 1993. Archived from the original (PDF) on 22 September 2009.
- "The Bathurst Lighthouse on Rottnest Island". Lighthouses of Australia. 23 February 1999. Archived from the original on 5 November 2010.
- "City of York (1861-1899)". WA Maritime Museum . Archived from the original on 26 August 2006.
- Register of Heritage Places - Permanent Entry : Rottnest Island Light Station (Report). Heritage Council of Western Australia. p. 4.
- "Rottnest Island Lightstation (Place ID 19860 )". Australian Heritage Database. Australian Government.
- "Fremantle". The Perth Gazette and West Australian Times. 18 August 1865.
- "ROTTNEST LIGHTHOUSE". The West Australian. Perth: National Library of Australia. 17 March 1896. p. 6.
- "The Cape Leeuwin Lighthouse". Lighthouses of Australia Inc. Archived from the original on 1 March 2014.
- "Lighthouse on Rottnest Island". The Argus. 31 July 1851.
- "Cape Leeuwin". Lighthouses of Western Australia. Archived from the original on 13 March 2014.
- Roe, John Septimus (1840). Sailing Directions For The Navigation About Rottnest Island – via Wikisource.
- Tourist information plaque. Wadjemup Hill.
- Stokes, John Lort (1846). Discoveries in Australia . Vol. 2. London: T. and W. Boone – via Wikisource.
