= City of York (barque) =

Ship wrecked off the coast of Western Australia

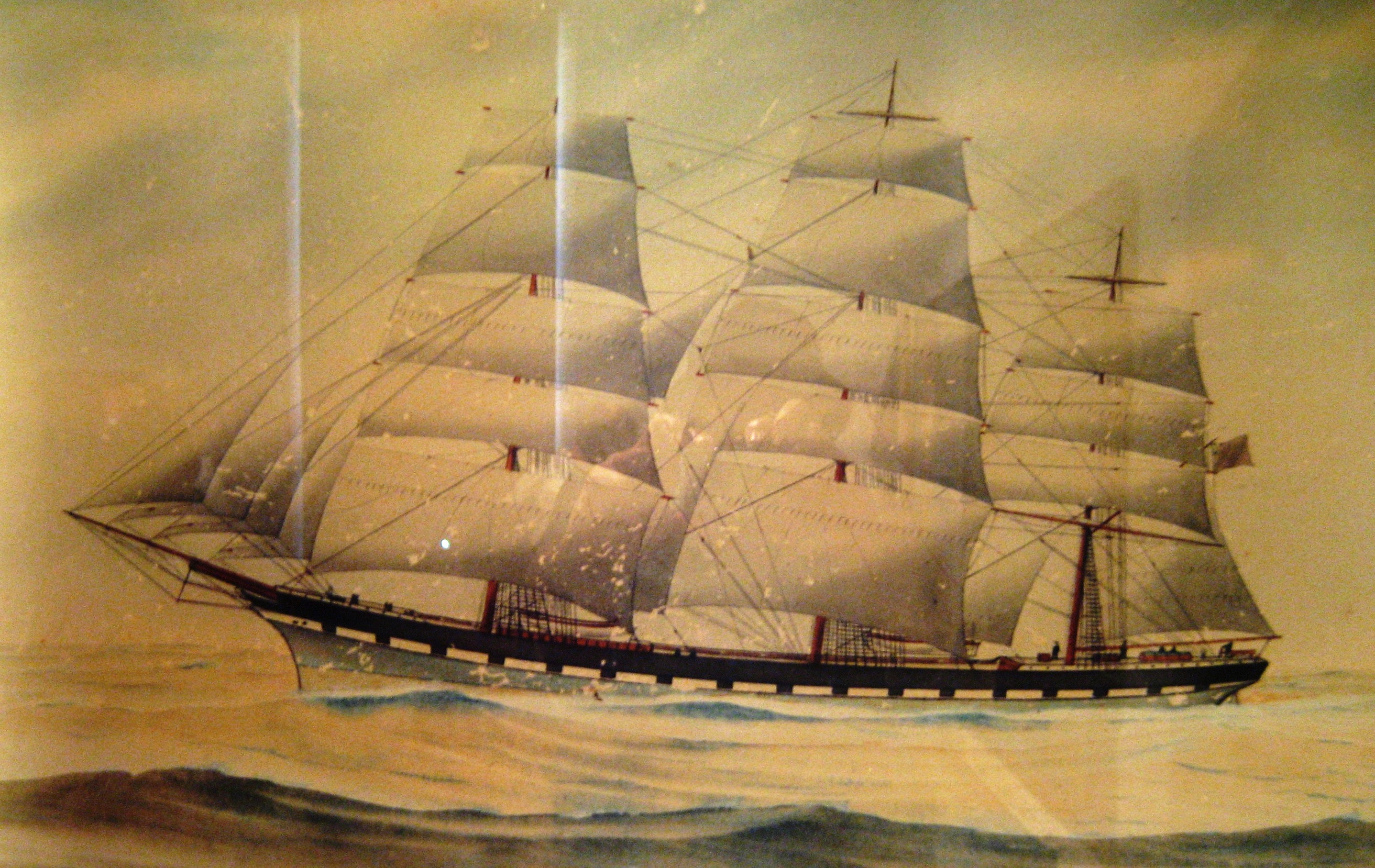
- The City of York from an original painting given to the Rottnest lightkeeper, David Mitchinson, and his wife, Kathleen, by the ship's owners in appreciation for their efforts in rescuing the crew

History
- Name: City of York
- Builder: J. Elder and Company Glasgow, Scotland
- Launched: 1869
- Fate: Lost 12 July 1899
- Wrecking: 31°59′39″S 115°29′20″E

General characteristics
- Tonnage: 1,167 GRT
- Length: 67.9 m (222.7 ft)
- Beam: 10.9 m (35.8 ft)
- Draught: 6.6 m (21.7 ft)
- Propulsion: three masted sail

The City of York was a 1,167 GRT iron ship (it was not a barque) which sank after hitting a reef off Rottnest Island in the last few kilometres of its voyage from San Francisco to Fremantle, Western Australia in 1899.

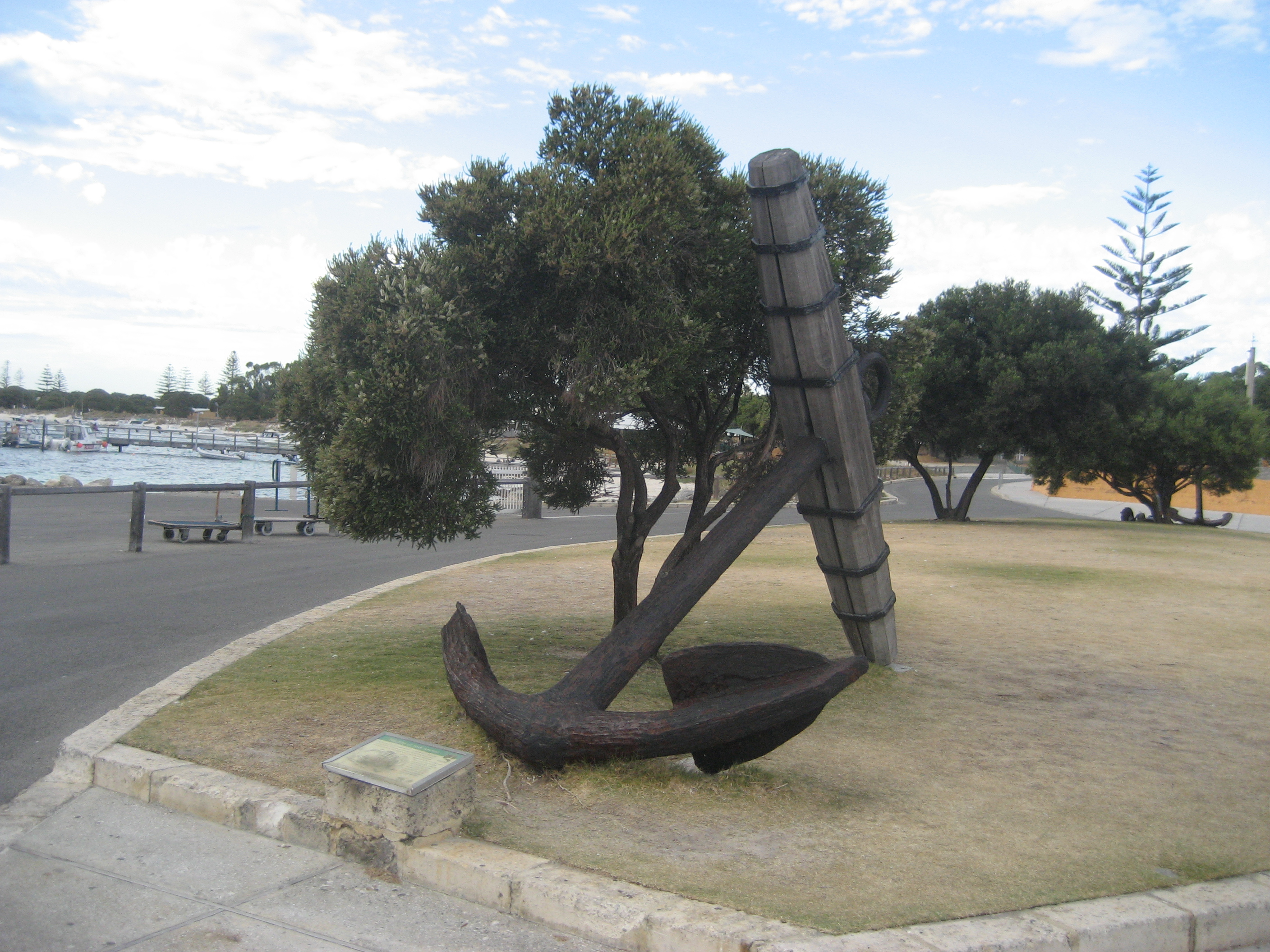
Anchor from the City of York, recovered from the wreck in 1959 and on display near the Main Jetty, Rottnest

The three masted, 67.9-metre-long (222.7 ft), iron-hulled ship was built in 1869 by Glasgow shipbuilders J. Elder and Company. The British owners were the 'Ship City of York Company'.

== Sinking ==
The vessel departed San Francisco on 13 April 1899 under Captain Phillip Jones with a cargo of 1,754.33 cubic metres (61,953.7 ft^{3}) of Oregon timber and 3,638 doors. After making a record passage to Western Australia, she approached Rottnest from the north on the afternoon of 12 July 1899 in stormy weather including blinding rain and heavy seas. At that time, the Rottnest lighthouse, now called Wadjemup Lighthouse, at the centre of the island was the only lighthouse on Rottnest. The ship was seen by the lightkeeper at 4:30 pm on a north-westerly bearing about 29 km (18 mi) off the coast of the island, heading north-east.

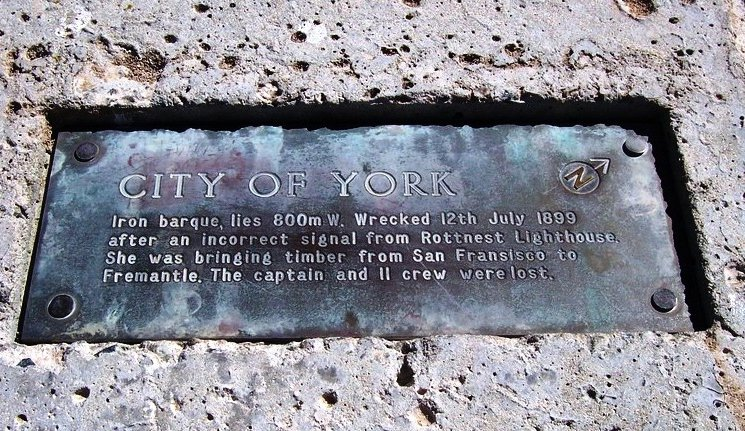
Memorial plaque on the shore of the City of York Bay showing (incorrectly) casualties from the shipwreck. 11 men including the captain drowned.

The keeper telephoned the news of the sighting to the head pilot who was on duty in the main island settlement at Thomson Bay who readied himself and his pilot boat to go to the assistance of the ship once it signalled for a pilot.

At 6:45 pm, the ship had still not signalled for a pilot, so the assistant lightkeeper challenged the ship by lighting a flare at the base of the lighthouse, meaning for the ship to stand off until the pilot had arrived.

The captain however mistook the signal for the international code as being from a pilot boat itself and that the ship should continue towards it (the pilot boat). The ship was now unwittingly sailing straight towards the shallow reefs which surround the island.

Lead was cast three times over 15 minutes to gauge the depth, and readings of 27.4, 16.5 and 9.1 metres (15, 9 and 5 fathoms) were taken respectively. Shortly after the last cast, breakers were sighted. The captain gave immediate orders to turn the ship but was unsuccessful and she struck remaining high on the reef 200 metres (660 ft) offshore from what is today the City of York bay, midway along the north side of the island.

=== Eleven men drown ===
Captain Jones ordered the 26 crew into the two lifeboats. Six men including First Mate William Pape managed to get in the first lifeboat before its holding rope broke and it drifted free from the stricken vessel. The remaining 20 men managed to get into the remaining lifeboat and stood a short distance off for an hour or so while Captain Jones considered his options. As the ship appeared to be holding steady of the reef, Jones ordered the lifeboat to return to the ship, but while doing so, the small boat was hit by a large wave and overturned, tipping all of the men into the heavy seas.

Eight men managed to re-board the City of York and one man was picked up by the first mate's boat. Eleven others, including Captain Jones, were drowned. After several hours battling the seas, the seven men in the remaining lifeboat managed to get to shore and several walked, exhausted, several kilometres through the bush to the lighthouse. The remaining men onshore were recovered shortly afterwards and the following morning, the master and owner of the steam tug Dunskey, Captain William Douglas, rowed his vessel's 4.5-metre (15 ft) dinghy to the wreck from seaward and was able to rescue the remaining eight men on the ship.

== Court of inquiry ==
An inquiry was held a week later which found that the wreck was caused by the "gross carelessness and want of judgement shown by the master"; that is, Captain Jones. The finding was based on Admiralty Sailing Directions which directs that a ship must not approach Rottnest on its west or north-west side to a depth of less than 55 metres (30 fathoms).

The ship's owners challenged the finding, arguing that the international code of practice said that flare-ups were used as a signal from a pilot boat to show that the boat was in safe water. As was the practice, Captain Jones had replied with blue lights to signal his acknowledgement of the safe water flare-up signal. By implication, the assistant lightkeeper had been negligent in using an incorrect signal.

Concern about the signalling procedures grew and a Joint Select Committee of both Houses of Parliament was established to investigate the harbour and pilot services of the colony. The committee overturned the findings of the initial inquiry and exonerated Captain Jones.

The owners instituted a claim for damages of £7,000 from the Government of Western Australia on the basis that the ship was lost due to misleading signals and that the government, as operators of the lighthouse was responsible. The case was pursued as far as the Privy Council in London in October 1902. The Privy Council case was not heard however, as the respondents allowed the appeal to lapse.

A settlement of £3,000 (Note: Some sources say £5,000.) was negotiated in early 1903.

The City of York was abandoned with general agreement of there being no likelihood of the hull being salvaged. Much of the timber cargo was salvageable however and was bought for £323/5/- by a Perth syndicate who also bought the cargo from the Carlisle Castle.

== Current condition ==
The wreck is located on the northern side of Rottnest Island, lying in 7 metres (23 ft) of water on a reef bottom with the bow facing to shore. It appears the vessel may have broken in two amidships with two sections of deck framing off centre. Several sections stand proud of the sea-bed. The hull has largely disintegrated with only the vessel's floors and the stern section recognisable. Plating, frames and stringers are strewn throughout the wreckage with one deck winch and sections of windlass the only machinery apparent.

The anchor from the ship has been retrieved from the wreck site and currently stands prominently outside the accommodation office on the island.

== Another wreck and aftermath ==
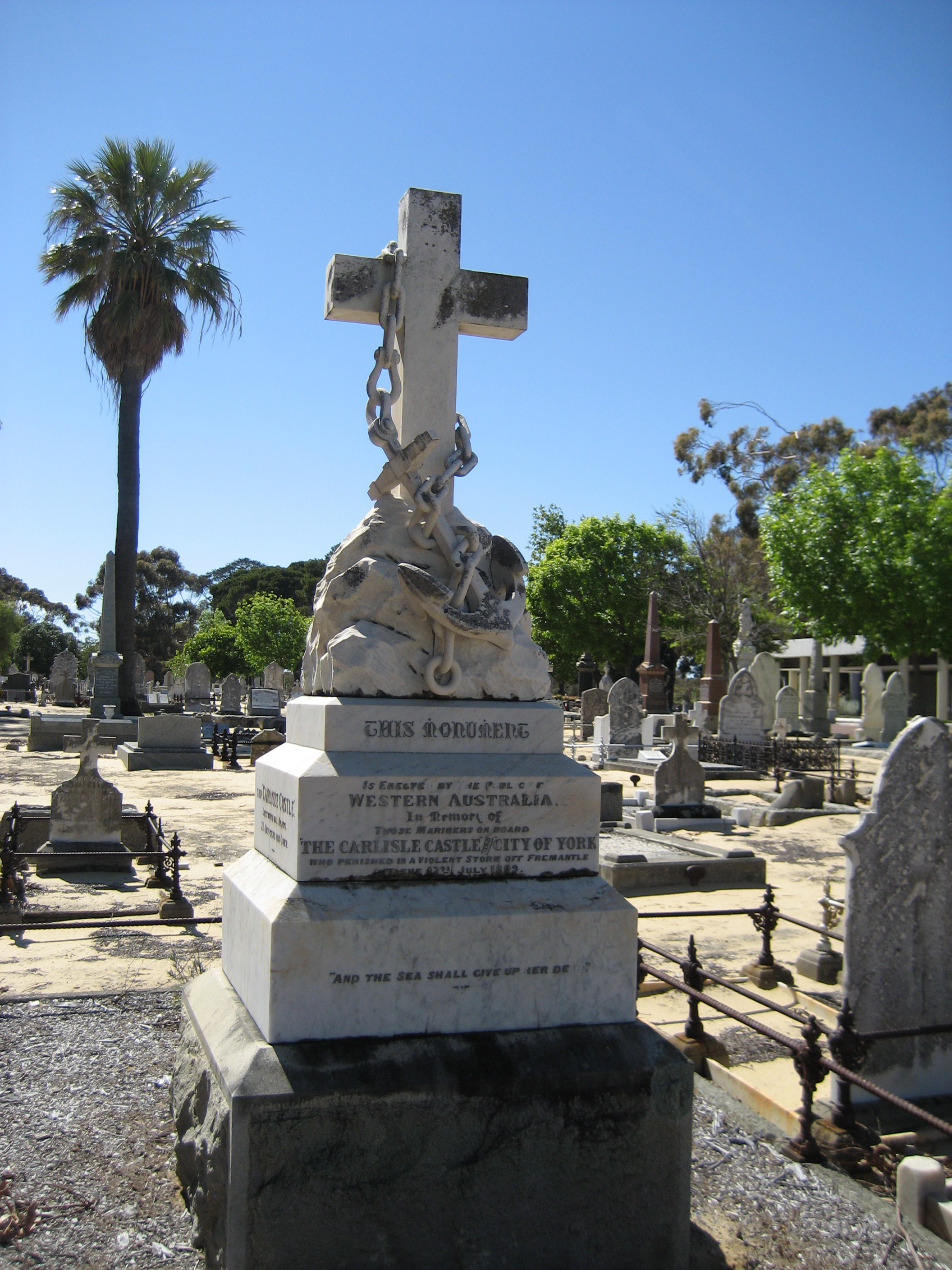
Fremantle Cemetery memorial

The same storm also caused the wrecking of the Carlisle Castle, a 1,508-tonne (1,484-long-ton), 70-metre (230 ft) barque which hit Coventry Reef at 32°20′00″S 115°38′07″E, a few kilometres south of Rottnest and 3 kilometres (1.9 mi) west of Penguin Island. The ship had been carrying general cargo as well as locking bars which were for the construction of the Goldfields Water Supply Scheme. Between 24 and 26 people were estimated to be on board. All on board were drowned. Initially, it was unclear if there was one or two shipwrecks after debris started floating ashore near South Beach in Fremantle. A pilot sent out from Fremantle ascertained the fate of the Carlisle Castle at about the same time as the City of York was first sighted, however delays in communications and the severe weather added to the confusing situation.

A short time after the storm, the government recognised the need for additional lighthouses to assist with navigation in the waters around the island and the approaches to Fremantle. A second lighthouse at Rottnest at Bathurst Point on the eastern end was built soon after, being completed just 13 months after the City of York incident. New pilot boats, like the Lady Forrest were also commissioned to improve pilot services out of Fremantle.

A memorial at Fremantle Cemetery commemorates the lives lost in the City of York and Carlisle Castle tragedies. The memorial was built in 1900 from public subscriptions.

== See also ==
- Rottnest Island shipwrecks
