= Graeme Henderson =

Australian maritime historian and author

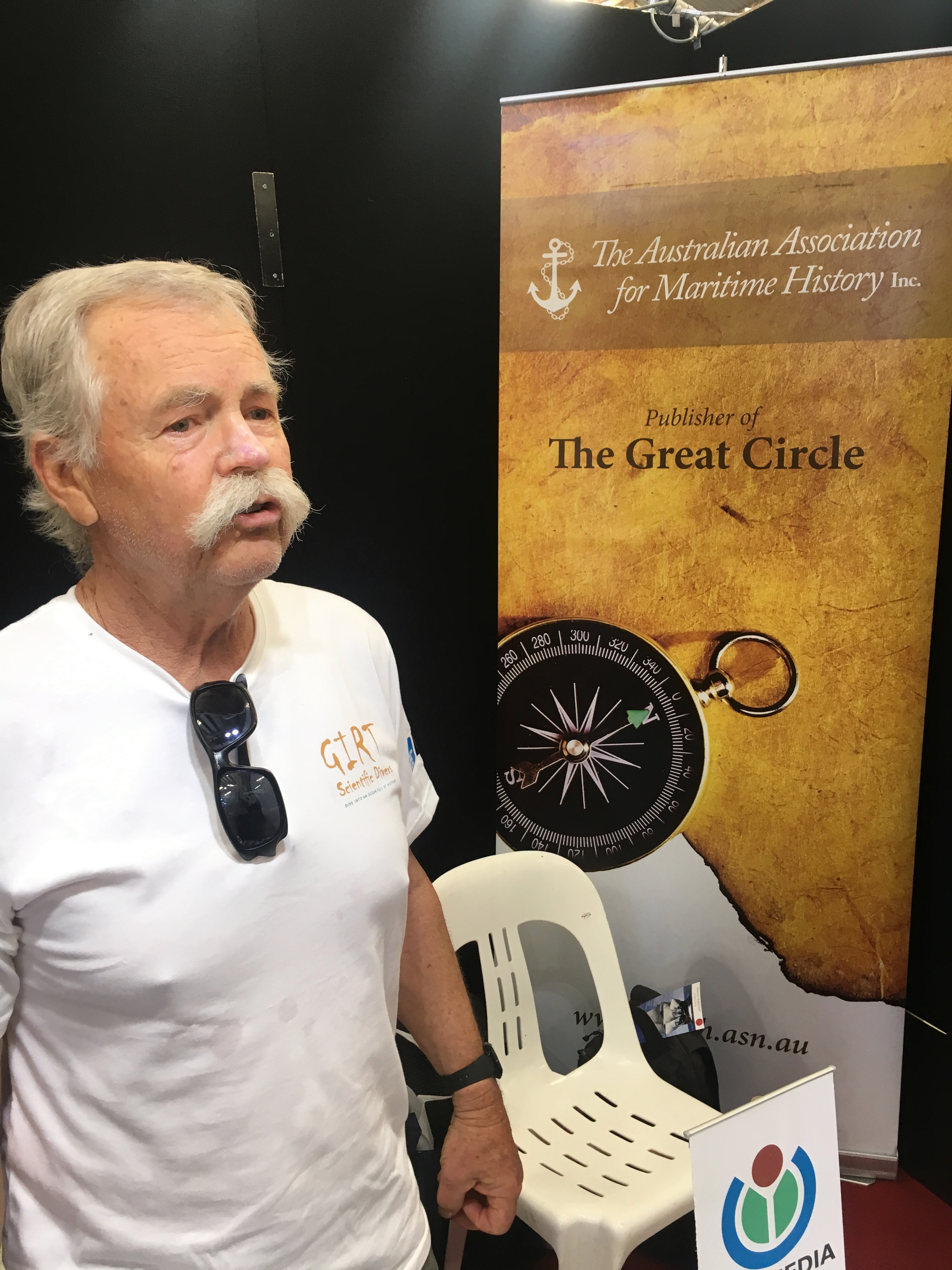
Graeme Henderson at the Fremantle Maritime Day 2018 in B Shed

Graeme Henderson AM (born 1947) is an Australian maritime historian and maritime archaeologist. Since the early 1970s he played a leading role in developing maritime archaeology and maritime museums in Australia, having assisted in, or led the investigation of wrecks in the Fremantle area as well as on the Western Australian coast, on islands offshore and in the Eastern States. Henderson was the first Director of the new Western Australian Maritime Museum on Victoria Quay from 1992 to 2005.

In the 1990s, as a Member of the International Congress of Maritime Museums he extended his activities internationally, eventually establishing the ICOMOS International Committee on Underwater Cultural Heritage Inc., which played the lead role in developing the UNESCO Convention for the Protection of the Underwater Cultural Heritage.

As the founding Chairman of the International Committee on the Underwater Cultural Heritage (ICUCH) he played a role in initiating development of a first draft for the UNESCO 2001 Convention on the Protection of the Underwater Cultural Heritage.

Henderson is the author of over 100 works in maritime history and archaeology including 10 books.

== Awards ==
2001: Centenary Medal, Commonwealth of Australia, 'For service to the community of Western Australia through the WA Maritime Museum'.

2002: Western Australian Citizen of the Year (Cit.WA): Arts, Culture, Entertainment. 'In recognition of the Achievement and Contribution to the State and People of Western Australia.'

2012: Member of the Order of Australia (AM). 'For service to maritime archaeology in Western Australia through the documentation and preservation of Australia's underwater cultural heritage, to international professional associations, and to the community'.

== Life and wreck-related activities ==
Henderson was born in Subiaco, Western Australia, to Marion Henderson and James Henderson, a journalist and author with an interest in shipwrecks and maritime history.

In April 1963 Henderson was the first of a group of spearfishers (including James Henderson, his other son Alan, John Cowan and Alan Robinson) to see wreckage that later proved to be the Vergulde Draeck (1656) popularly known as the Gilt Dragon. In December of that year, at the suggestion of Phillip Playford, the Henderson family and John Cowan passed their rights as discovers of the wreck to the Western Australian Museum. In the following year the State of Western Australia proclaimed the Museum Act Amendment Act of 1964, protecting the Dutch East India Company ships Vergulde Draeck (1656), Batavia (1629), Zuytdorp (1712), and Zeewijk (1727), together with the English East India Company ship Tryall or Trial (1622), and what was called the "Cottesloe wreck", then thought to be a Dutch or Portuguese wreck dating around 1600 (later shown by Henderson to be the Elizabeth).

This 1964 Act was the precursor to all Australian shipwreck legislation and led directly to the establishment of maritime archaeology in Western Australia and later across the nation.

Henderson completed Bachelor and Master of Arts degrees at the University of Western Australia and after joining the Western Australian Museum's Maritime Archaeology department became active in studying maritime history and shipwrecks of the colonial era.

In addition to the Vergulde Draeck, in the course of his recreational and professional activities Henderson also found, or was part of a team that found, other historic sites, including the place where HMS Success (1828) grounded, the wreck of the trader Lancier (1839), both off Fremantle, and the remains of the sealer Belinda (1824) off Esperance.

After being appointed Head of the Colonial Shipwrecks unit Henderson led major expeditions and research into the English whaler Lively (c1806) on the Rowley Shoals, the American China-trader Rapid (1811) on the Ningaloo coast, the regional trader Elizabeth (1839), the ex-slaver James Matthews (1841) in Cockburn Sound, and the emigrant barque Eglinton (1852) off the Perth suburb of Eglinton. He also had leading roles in archaeological expeditions to the wrecks of HMS Sirius (1790) at Norfolk Island, HMS Pandora (1791) off Queensland, and the Sydney Cove (1799) in Bass Strait. Material from these excavations was incorporated in the exhibitions of the Queensland Museum and the Queen Victoria Museum and Art Gallery in Tasmania and led to the creation of the HMS Sirius Museum on Norfolk Island.

Henderson is the founding Chairman of Wreck Check Inc., a group whose objects are to search for, locate, and document underwater cultural heritage whether found or unfound.

== Publications ==
- Henderson, Graeme (1980), Unfinished voyages : Western Australian shipwrecks, 1622-1850, University of Western Australia Press, ISBN 0-85564-176-2
- Henderson, Graeme (1986), Maritime Archaeology in Australia, UWA Press, ISBN 0-85564-282-3
- Henderson, Graeme and Henderson Kandy-Jane (1988), Unfinished voyages : Western Australian shipwrecks, 1851-1880 (2nd ed.), UWA Press, ISBN 0-85564-282-3
- Cairns, Lynne and Henderson Graeme (1995), Unfinished voyages : Western Australian shipwrecks, 1881-1900 (2nd ed.), UWA Press, ISBN 1-875560-24-6
- Henderson, Graeme (2007), Unfinished voyages : Western Australian shipwrecks, 1622-1850 (2nd ed.), UWA Press, ISBN 978-1-920694-88-3
- — (2009), Redemption of a slave ship : the James Matthews (1st ed.), Western Australia Museum, ISBN 978-1-920843-99-1
- — (2016), Swallowed by the sea : the story of Australia's shipwrecks, NLA Publishing; Perth, WA : Western Australian Museum, ISBN 978-0-642-27894-4
- Henderson, Graeme, de Hoop, Robert and Viduka, Andrew (2022), Misadventures in Nature's Paradise: Australia's Cocos (Keeling) Islands and Christmas Island during the Dutch era, UWA Publishing, ISBN 978-1-76080-233-2
