= Geography of Rottnest Island =

Coordinates: 32°00′07″S 115°31′01″E

Rottnest Island lies 18 kilometres (11 mi) west of the coastline of Perth, Western Australia. It is 4.5 kilometres (2.8 mi) at its widest and 11 kilometres (6.8 mi) at its longest.

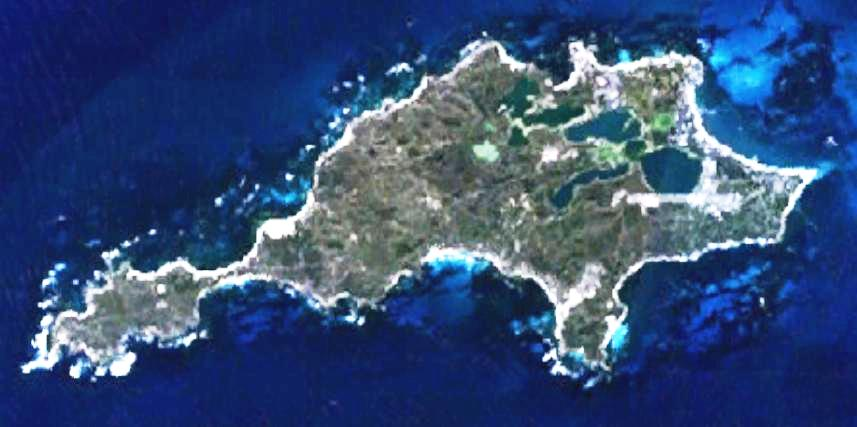

== Coastline features ==
The coastline is approximately 35.2 kilometres (21.9 mi) long. Bays, points, reefs and smaller islands along this coastline are extensively named.

== Topography ==
The named hills of Rottnest are Wadjemup Hill, Oliver Hill, Radar Hill and Mount Herschel. Of these Wadjemup Hill is the highest, at 45 metres (148 ft), and the location of the Wadjemup Lighthouse.

== Named coastal features ==
=== Bays, coves and beaches ===
- Armstrong Bay
- Basin (usually known as The Basin)
- Bickley Bay – just south of Kingstown Barracks
- Catherine Bay
- City of York Bay – west of Little Armstrong Bay
- Eagle Bay – at the West End
- Fay's Bay
- Fish Hook Bay
- Geordie Bay
- Little Armstrong Bay
- Little Geordie Bay
- Little Parakeet Bay
- Little Salmon Bay
- Longreach Bay – between the Basin and Geordie Bay
- Mabel Cove
- Marjorie Bay
- Mary Cove
- Nancy Cove – narrowest part of Island
- Parakeet Bay
- Peterson Beach
- Pinky Beach
- Porpoise Bay (also known as Salmon Bay)
- Ricey Beach
- Rocky Bay
- Salmon Bay
- Stark Bay
- Strickland Bay (Note: Known as 'Narrow Neck Bay' until changed to 'Strickland Bay' in 1913.)
- Thomson Bay - the main bay on the coast adjacent to the main settlement Thomson Bay settlement
- Wilson Bay

=== Points, Islands and Rocks ===
- Abraham Point
- Armstrong Rock
- Bathurst Point – location of the Bathurst Lighthouse
- Bickley Point
- Cape Vlamingh – also known as West End
- Cathedral Rocks – north west of West End
- Crayfish Rocks
- Duck Rock
- Dyer Island
- Fairbridge Bluff
- Green Island
- Henrietta Rocks
- Mushroom Rock
- Narrow Neck
- North Point
- Parker Point – southernmost point
- Phillip Point
- Phillip Rocks
- Radar Reef – at West End
- Salmon Point
- South Point
- Vera Rocks
- Wallace Island
- West End

=== Structures ===
- Kingstown jetty
- Thomson Bay jetty

== Named lakes ==
- Garden Lake
- Government House Lake
- Lake Baghdad
- Lake Herschel/ Herschel Lake
- Lake Negri
- Lake Sirius
- Lake Timperley
- Lake Vincent
- Pearse Lake
- Serpentine Lake

== Wells and bores ==
The island is very limited in water supply and considerable numbers of bores have been sunk to keep water supply available.

In 1976, Philip Playford's Geological Map of Rottnest identified wells, abandoned wells, and bores on the island. The following is only a select list of the full range.

=== West end ===
- Radar Hill just east of Cape Vlaming had Radar Station Well and was designated "abandoned".

=== South coast ===
- Parker Point between Salmon Bay And Porpoise Bay, had Parker Point Bores as "abandoned", closer to Tree Hill the well and bore were active.

== See also ==
- Rottnest Island shipwrecks — details on the twelve larger shipwrecks in close proximity to the island
- Colonial buildings of Rottnest Island
- Islands of Perth, Western Australia
