= List of State Register of Heritage Places on Rottnest Island =

The State Register of Heritage Places is maintained by the Heritage Council of Western Australia. As of 2026, 45 places are heritage-listed on Rottnest Island, of which 24 are on the State Register of Heritage Places.

== List ==
The Western Australian State Register of Heritage Places, as of 2026, lists the following 24 state registered places on Rottnest Island:

Place name	Place #	Location	Suburb or town	Co-ordinates	Built	State registered	Notes	Photo
Kingstown Barracks	525	Phillip Point & Bickley Point	Rottnest Island	32°00′17″S 115°33′12″E	1938	1 October 2002	A defence complex in the Inter War Art Deco style	
Thomson Bay Settlement	516	Thomson Bay	Rottnest Island	31°59′44″S 115°32′29″E	1840	3 July 1992	Also referred to as Rottnest Island Settlement; The settlement consists of the cottages along Thomson Bay, hotel (the former Governor's residence), the hostel (the former boys' reformatory school), the Quad (former gaol), stone cottages, Loma's cottage and Board of Control office, boat house, sentry box and cell below sea wall, the sea wall, the cottage used by the Control Board Manager	
Bickley Battery	3321		Rottnest Island	32°00′31″S 115°33′09″E			Part of Kingstown Barracks Precinct (525); Consists of two 6-inch guns and quarters	
Buckingham Palace	518		Rottnest Island	31°59′42″S 115°32′23″E	1871		Also referred to as Lomas Cottage; Part of Thomson Bay Settlement Precinct (516)	
Hospital Precinct	3654		Rottnest Island	32°00′18″S 115°33′17″E			Part of Kingstown Barracks Precinct (525)	
Officer's & N.C.O.'s Precinct	3653		Rottnest Island	32°00′17″S 115°33′12″E			Part of Kingstown Barracks Precinct (525)	
Salt Lakes Conservation Area	3652		Rottnest Island	32°00′00″S 115°32′00″E			Part of Thomson Bay Settlement Precinct (516); Salt lakes, among them Government House Lake and Lake Baghdad, occupy ten per cent of the island	
Salt Store	3651		Rottnest Island	31°59′46″S 115°32′28″E			Also referred to as Board Offices; Part of Thomson Bay Settlement Precinct (516)	
Timber Bungalow Precinct	3438		Rottnest Island	31°59′44″S 115°32′29″E			Part of Thomson Bay Settlement Precinct (516)	
Bathurst Lighthouse & Quarters	517	Bathurst Point	Rottnest Island	31°59′22″S 115°32′27″E	1896	4 May 2001	Consists of a limestone lighthouse and limestone and fibro quarters in the Federation Free Classical and Federation Bungalow styles	
The Lodge	521	Digby Drive	Rottnest Island	31°59′47″S 115°32′23″E	1864		Also referred to as Boys' School/Reformatory (former) and Native Prison/Hospital (former); Part of Thomson Bay Settlement Precinct (516)	
Rottnest Island Hotel	522	Forrest Avenue	Rottnest Island	31°59′54″S 115°32′32″E	1864		Also referred to as Government House (former) and Quokka Arms Hotel; Part of Thomson Bay Settlement Precinct (516)	
Forge and Grain Crushing Mill (former)	524	Kitson Avenue	Rottnest Island	31°59′46″S 115°32′25″E	1858		Also referred to as Quarters, Moyns Hairdresser, Billiard Room, Rottnest Island Museum, Hay Store and Hostel Staff; Part of Thomson Bay Settlement Precinct (516)	
Old Chapel (former)	523	Kitson Street	Rottnest Island	31°59′46″S 115°32′23″E	1862		Also referred to as School; Part of Thomson Bay Settlement Precinct (516)	
General Store	527	Maley Street Mall	Rottnest Island	31°59′45″S 115°32′26″E	1859		Part of Thomson Bay Settlement Precinct (516)	
Oliver Hill Battery	526	Oliver Hill	Rottnest Island	32°00′25″S 115°31′01″E	1936	3 July 1992	Also referred to as Signal Station and Battery Observation Post; Consists of two 9.2-inch guns and quarters	
Board Cottage	529	Vincent Way^{[2]}	Rottnest Island	31°59′39″S 115°32′26″E	1859		Also referred to as Crew's Dwelling; Part of Thomson Bay Settlement Precinct (516)	
Cottages F & G	520	Vincent Way^{[2]}	Rottnest Island	31°59′44″S 115°32′27″E	1839		Part of Thomson Bay Settlement Precinct (516; Also referred to as the Superintendent's Residence	
Cottages H, J & E	519	Vincent Way^{[2]}	Rottnest Island	31°59′43″S 115°32′26″E	1844		Part of Thomson Bay Settlement Precinct (516); Also referred to as the Military Barracks	
Island Manager's House	530	Vincent Way^{[2]}	Rottnest Island	31°59′42″S 115°32′26″E	1852		Part of Thomson Bay Settlement Precinct (516)	
Pilots House	531	Vincent Way^{[2]}	Rottnest Island	31°59′42″S 115°32′26″E	1844		Also referred to as Cottages K1 and K2; Part of Thomson Bay Settlement Precinct (516)	
Rottnest Island Light Station	3254	Wadjemup Road	Rottnest Island	32°00′26″S 115°30′15″E	1896	31 December 1993	Also referred to as Rottnest Island Lighthouse and Wadjemup Hill; One of two Type 8.3D lighthouses in Western Australia, the other being at Cape Leeuwin	
Battery Observation Post & Timber Signal Station	9146		Rottnest Island	32°00′26″S 115°30′15″E			Part of WWII Buildings, Oliver Hill Battery and Signal Ridge, Wadjemup/Rottnest Island Precinct (526)	
WRANS House, Wadjemup/ Rottnest Island^{[1]}	27033	Wadjemup Road	Rottnest Island	32°00′24″S 115°30′10″E	1937		Women's Royal Australian Naval Service (WRANS) House; Part of WWII Buildings, Oliver Hill Battery and Signal Ridge, Wadjemup/Rottnest Island Precinct (526)	

== Notes ==
- ^[1] Listed under both Rottnest Island and the City of Cockburn
- ^[2] Vincent Way was renamed to Nyi Nyi Bidi in 2023. Nyi Nyi Bidi means "The Crying Road" in the Noongar language. As of 2026, the State Register of Heritage Places does not reflect this name change, still using Vincent Way

== See also ==
- Colonial buildings of Rottnest Island
