= Landprints =

Landprints may refer to:

- Landprints, a book by Walter S. Sullivan
- Landprints: Reflections on Place and Landscape, a book by George Seddon
