= Rottnest Island Airport =

Airport on Rottnest Island, Western Australia

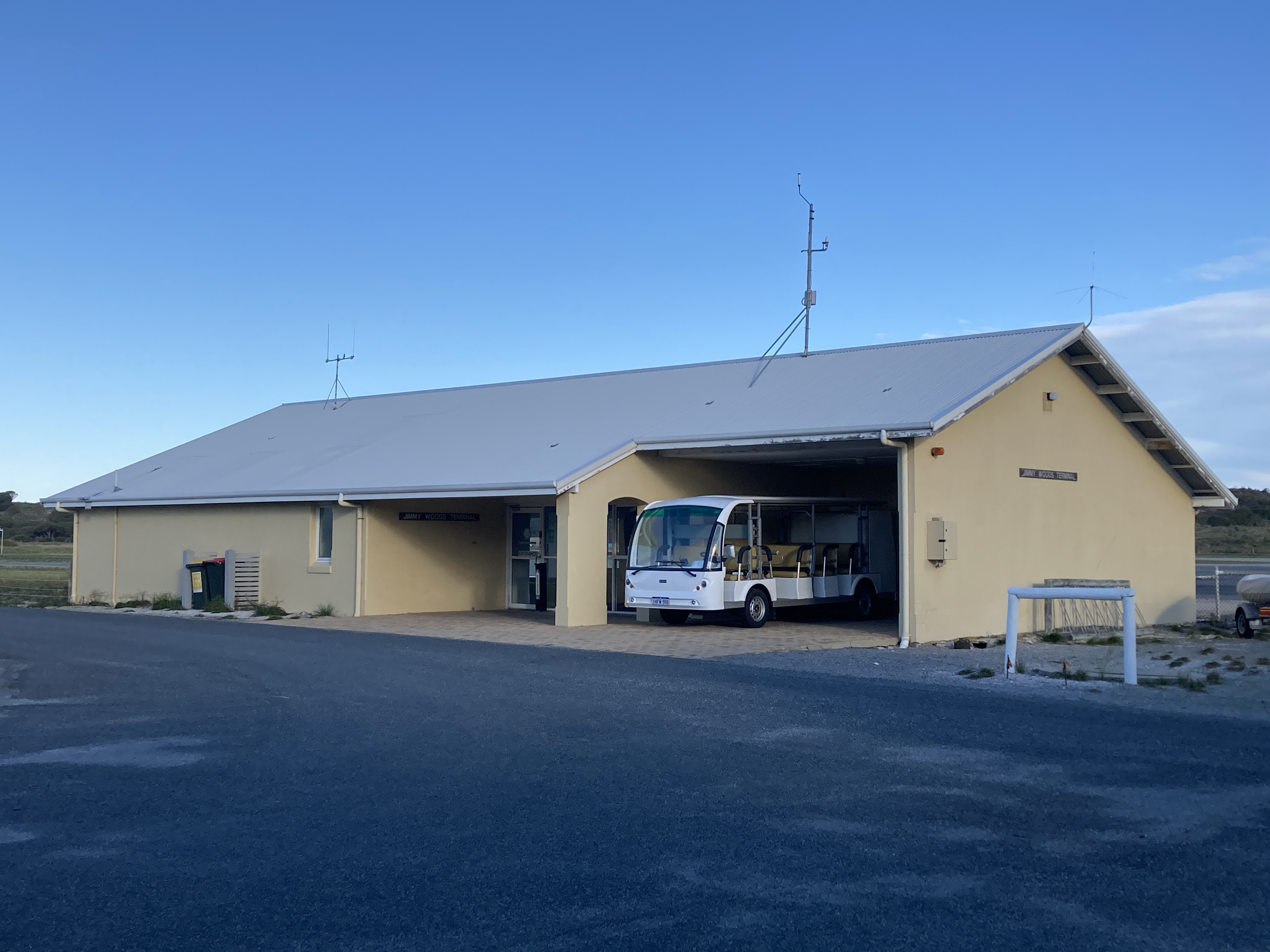
- Rottnest Island Airport, 2021
- IATA: RTS; ICAO: YRTI

Summary
- Airport type: Public
- Operator: Rottnest Island Authority
- Location: Rottnest Island
- Elevation AMSL: 12 ft (3.7 m)
- Coordinates: 32°00′24″S 115°32′23″E

Map
- Location in Western Australia

Runways
Direction	Length		Surface
Direction	m	ft	Surface
09/27	1,293	4,242	Asphalt
- Sources: Australian AIP and aerodrome chart

Rottnest Island Airport (IATA: RTS, ICAO: YRTI) is a small airport for light aircraft, situated about 800 metres (2,600 ft) from the main settlement at Thomson Bay, Rottnest Island and 19 kilometres (12 mi) northwest of Fremantle. Daily air services operate to the island. In the past these have been from Perth Airport, but in recent years have been mainly from Jandakot.

The single 1,290-by-18-metre (4,232 ft × 59 ft) runway runs east–west and is situated behind Thomson Bay and south of Government House Lake. Part of the lake was reclaimed for the construction of the airport runway. The Oliver Hill Railway runs south of and parallel to the runway.

The airport opened in November 1930 and has been used regularly since then for private and small commercial operations, ferrying workers and holiday makers between Perth and the island.

== Commercial services ==
At one stage, the 32-kilometre (20 mi) Perth to Rottnest flight was the world's shortest scheduled air route. Woods Airways, which was run by pioneer aviator Jimmy Woods, operated the Perth to Rottnest service from about 1948 with two war-surplus Royal Australian Air Force (RAAF) Avro Anson aircraft. The service closed in 1961 after concerns about the safety of the ageing aircraft and recurring conflict with the Department of Civil Aviation over minor infringements of regulations. In 14 years of operations, it had made more than 13,000 crossings.

Other services continued after Woods Airways departed and at various stages facilities were upgraded. Woods Airways and its owner were considered synonymous with the airport and in 1987 State Tourism Minister Pam Beggs opened the renamed and upgraded Jimmy Woods Air Terminal in recognition.

MacRobertson Miller Airlines took over services after Wood's Airways using both Douglas DC-3 and Fokker F27s, until the route became uneconomical. Rottnest Airlines (aka Quokka Airlines) operated the service until 1999 when it was taken over by Frank Stynman who operates a four and six-seater daily service from Jandakot called Rottnest Air-Taxi. Flying time is from 12 to 15 minutes. There are also daily seaplane services to nearby Thompson Bay operated by Swan River Seaplanes.

== Airlines and destinations ==
Airlines	Destinations
Rottnest Air Taxi	Jandakot

== Accidents and incidents ==
On 7 January 2025, a Cessna 208 seaplane operated by Swan River Seaplanes crashed soon after takeoff from Thomson Bay about 500 metres (1,600 ft) northeast of the airport to return to South Perth jetty. Of the six passengers and one pilot onboard, the 34-year-old pilot and two passengers (a female Swiss tourist, 65, and a Danish male tourist, 60) were killed. A further three passengers were injured.

On 12 November 2006 a light twin engine charter aircraft carrying the pilot and five passengers crashed on the edge of the salt lake adjoining the airport. The plane split in two from the impact and two passengers were hospitalised. All escaped with minor injuries. It is believed that the aircraft suffered an engine failure, and the pilot was not able to maintain control.

== Gallery ==
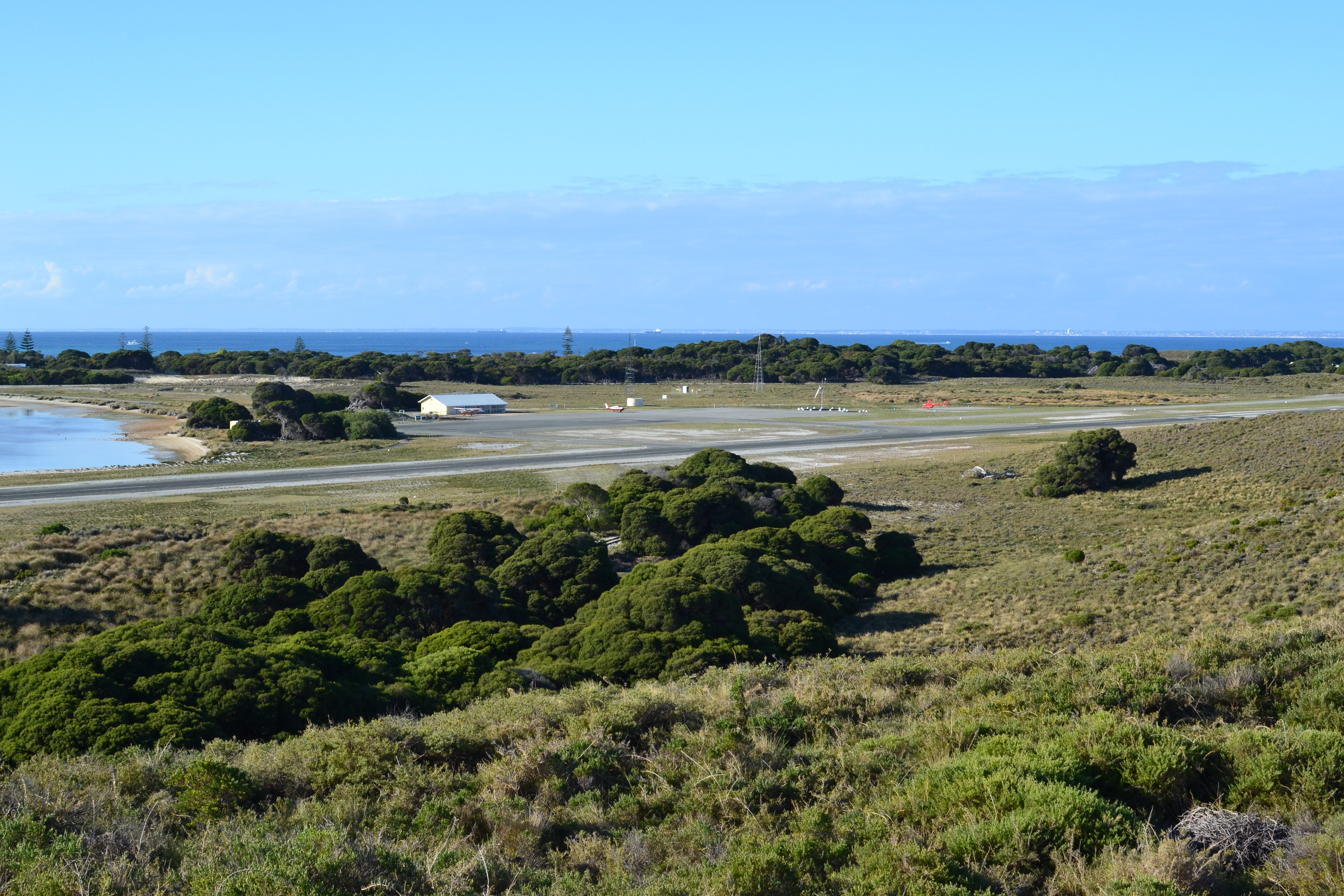
Airstrip and buildings from the south

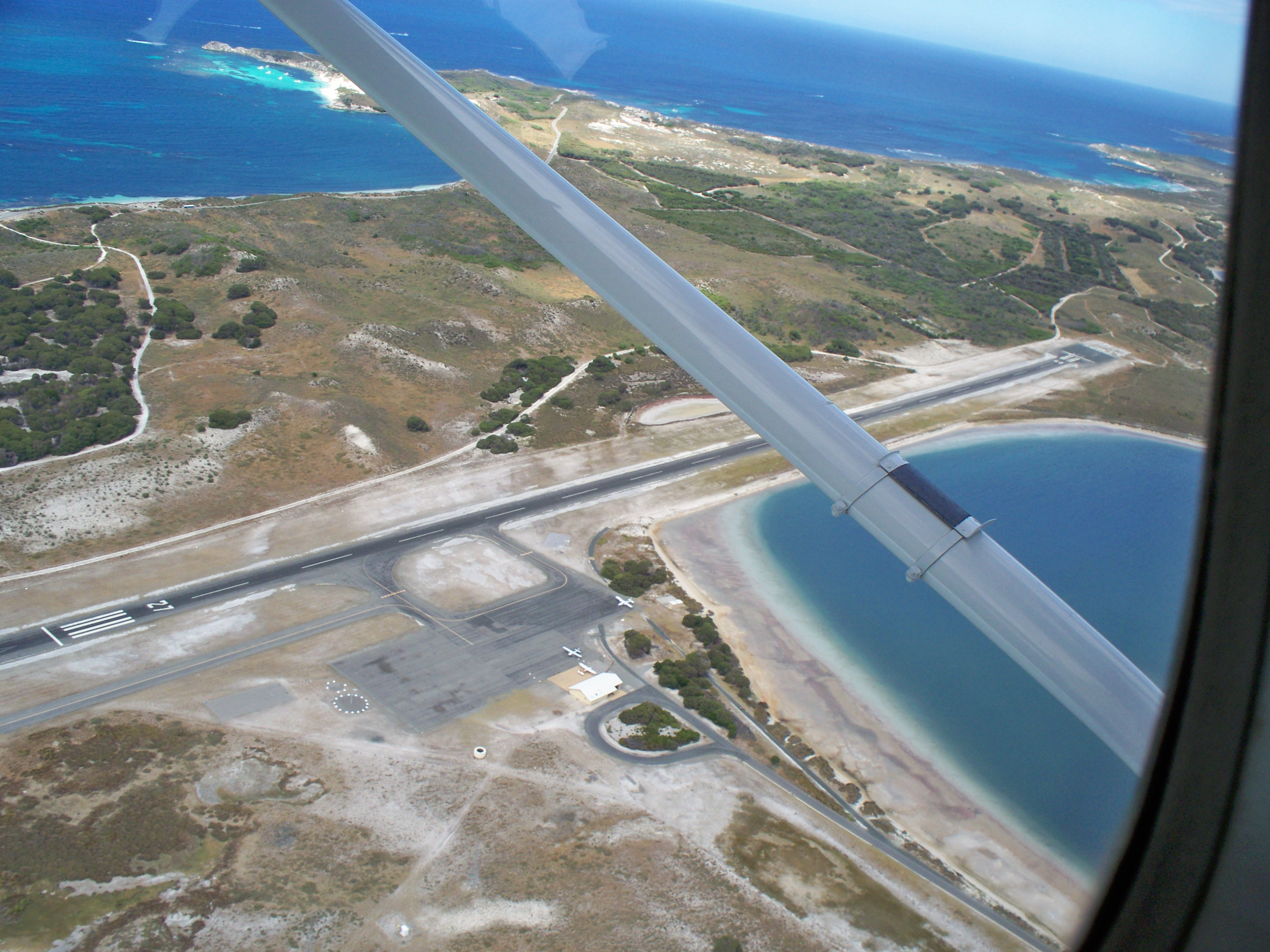
From the air

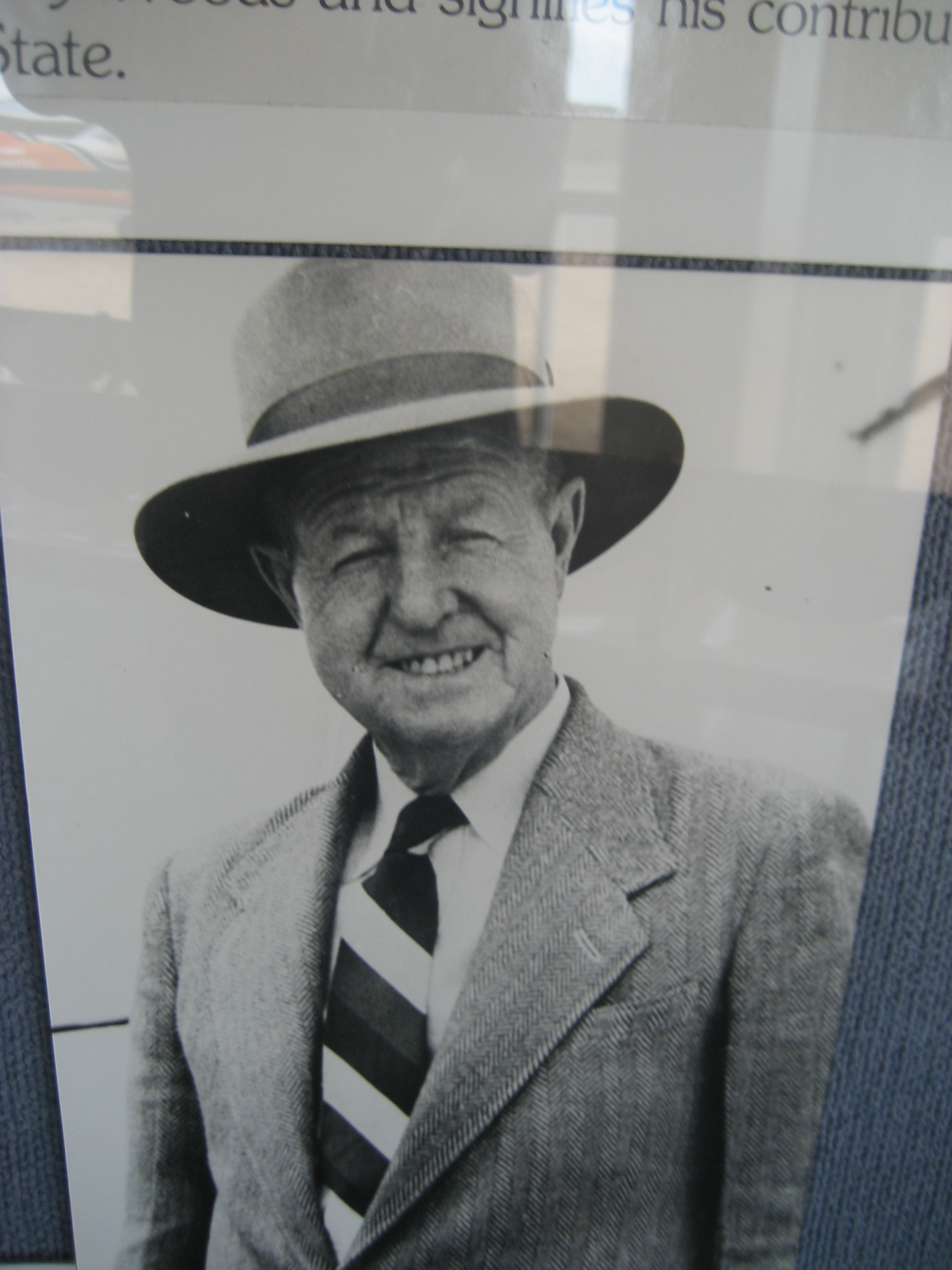
Jimmy Woods

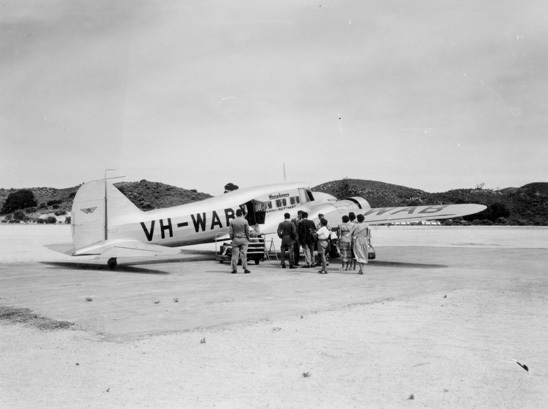
Woods Airways VH-WAB, c. 1953

== See also ==
- List of airports in Western Australia
- Aviation transport in Australia
