= Colonial buildings of Rottnest Island =

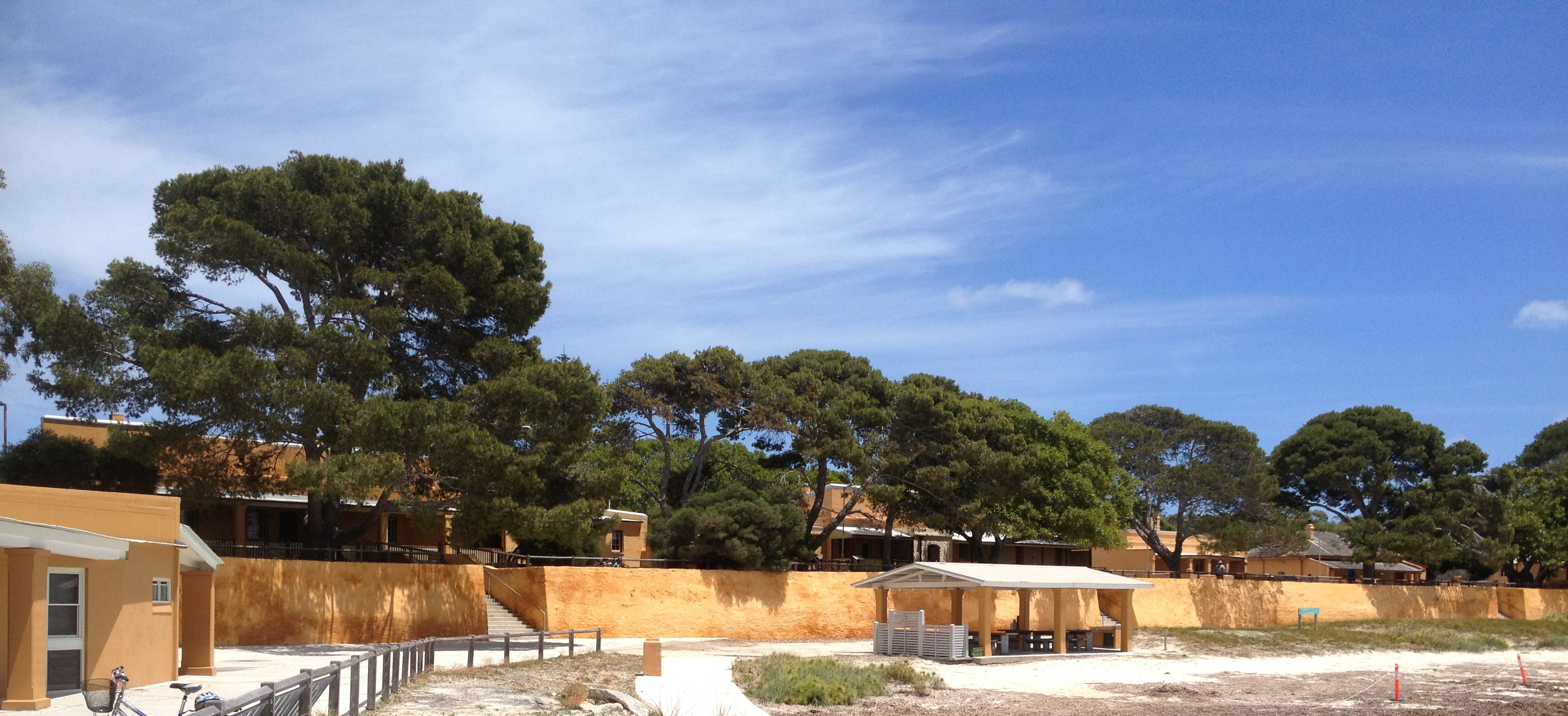
Several important colonial buildings, including the Superintendent's Residence overlook the seawall in Thomson Bay

Rottnest Island was first settled by European colonists in 1830 following their arrival at Western Australia and the Swan River Colony. Soon after, construction of a variety of private and public buildings commenced, many of which were built with Aboriginal convict labour and which remain today. This is a list of extant colonial buildings of Rottnest Island, constructed between 1830 and 1896.

The first European settler on the island was Robert Thomson, who established a modest farm for hay production, as well as a salt collection enterprise.

In August 1838, a Corporal Welch was sent to Rottnest with ten Aboriginal prisoners. The following year, Thomson had his whaleboat stolen, supposedly by several of the inmates, and after complaints, Governor John Hutt decided to resume all land grants previously made on the island. Henry Vincent, a gaoler at the Fremantle prison was subsequently sent to the island as its first superintendent. Vincent went on to personally build or oversee the construction of many of the buildings listed.

Building materials were mostly locally quarried limestone as well as timber from the local pine (callitris preissii) and featured distinctive rough plastered walls.

== First Superintendent's House ==
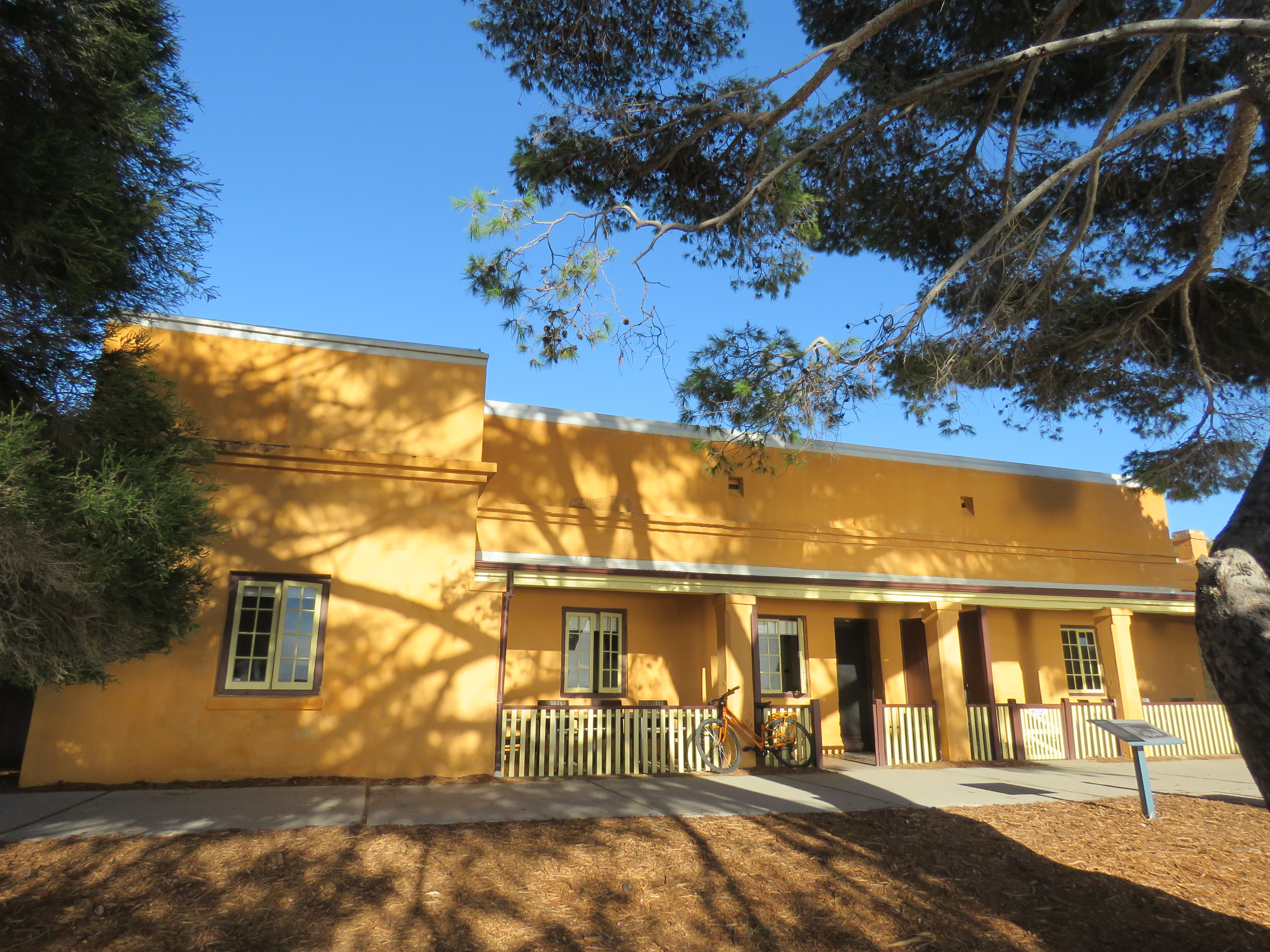
The former Superintendent’s Residence

Built around 1841.

Situated immediately above the Visitors Centre off the main jetty, the structure was built as the residence for the Superintendent of Rottnest Island. It was closed in 1904 and in 1913 divided into two cottages for use by government officials.

== Military Barracks ==
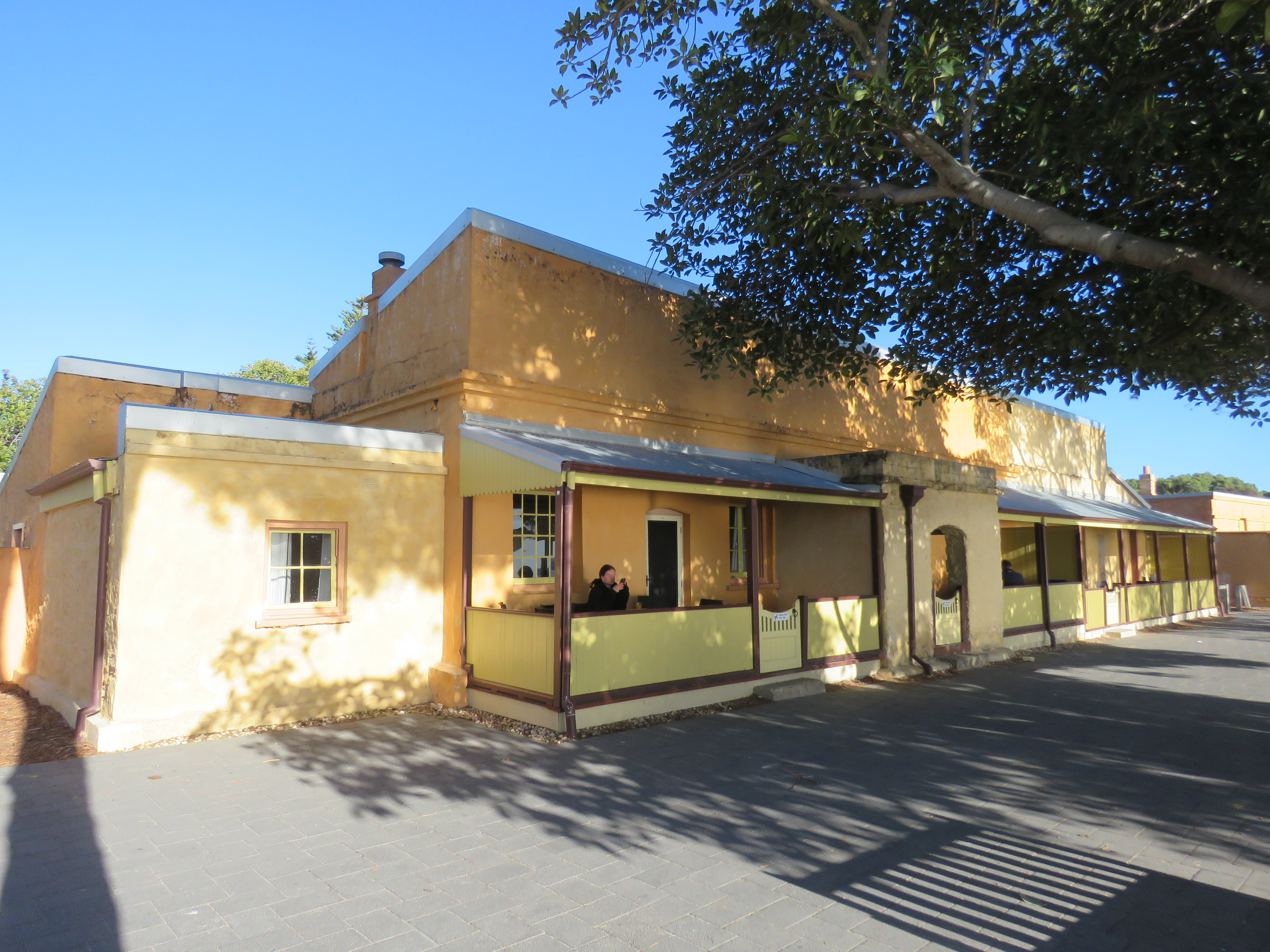
The former Military Barracks

Built around 1844. ( Cottages E, J, and H.)

== Pilot Crew's Quarters ==
Built 1846-1853.

== Pilot's Quarters ==
Built 1847.

== Second Superintendent's House ==
Built 1848.

== School and Chapel ==
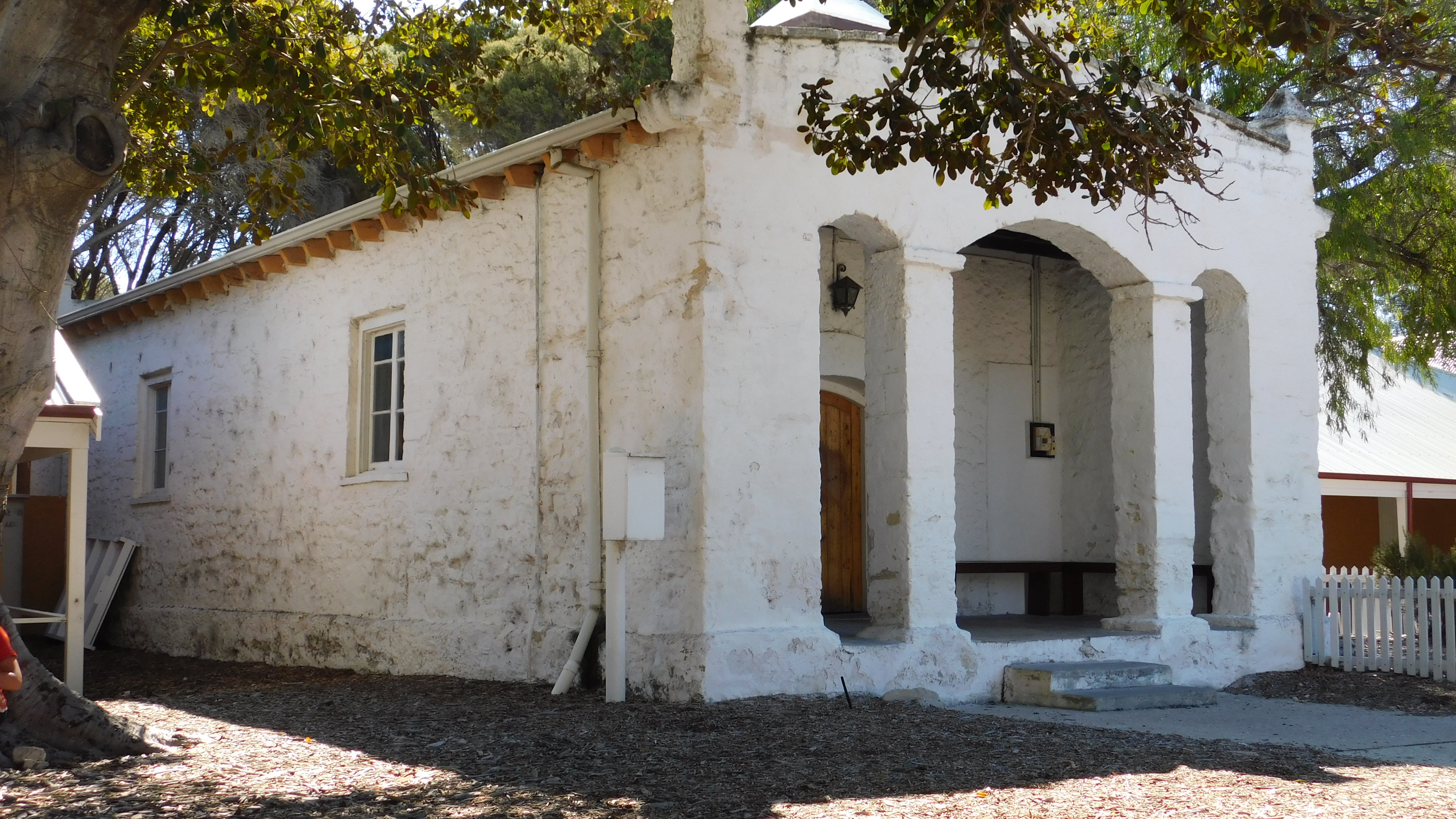
Rottnest Chapel, as seen from front

Built 1856–57.

The school and chapel were built in 1856 and 1857. Between the two World Wars the chapel was used as accommodation for domestic staff from the island's hotel.

== Mill and Hay Store ==
Built 1857.

== Governor's Residence ==
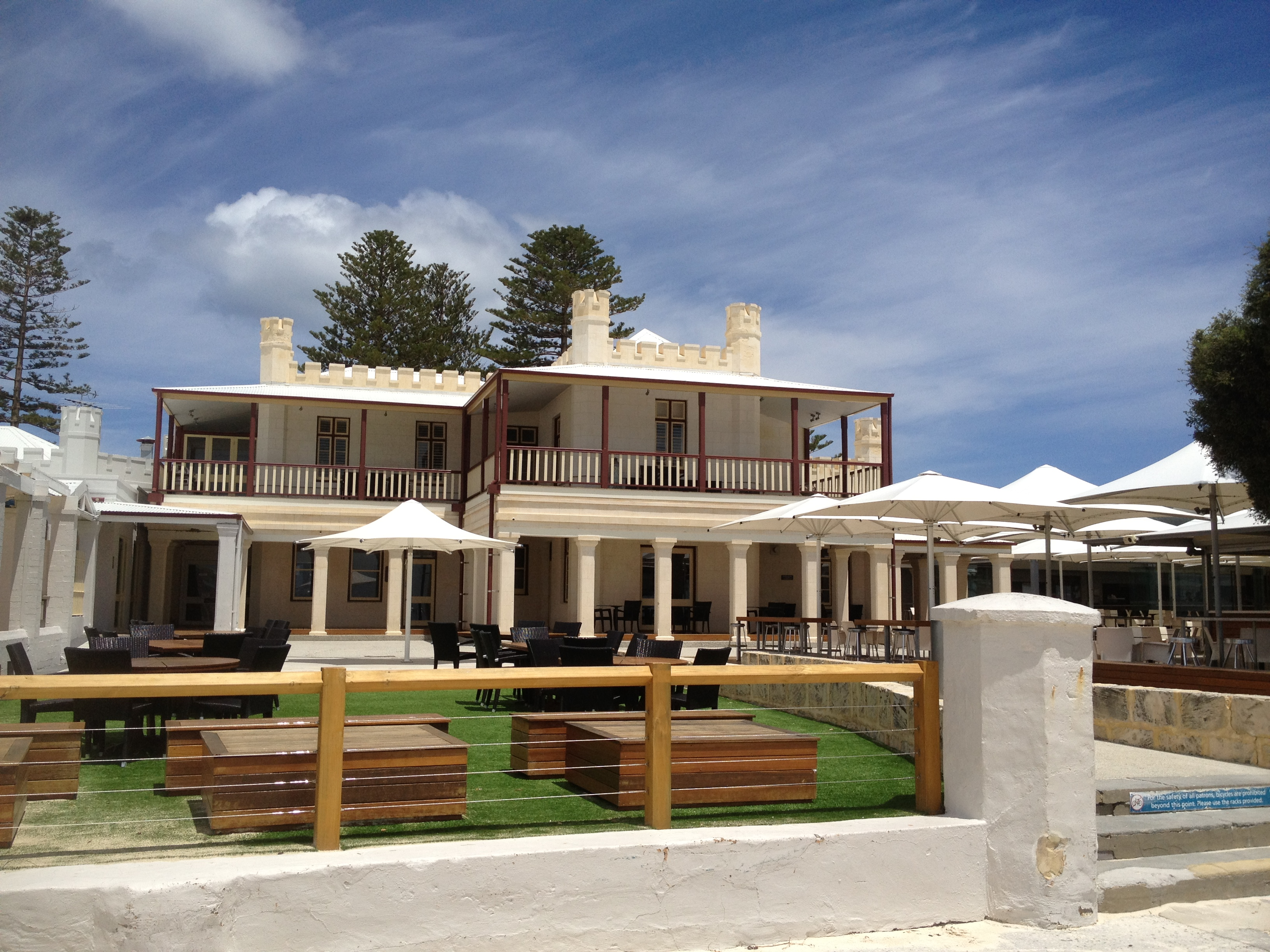
Hotel Rottnest

Built 1858-64.

In 1848 Governor Charles Fitzgerald expressed an interest in a summer residence on Rottnest. He resided temporarily in the First Superintendent's House. His successor, Sir Arthur Kennedy authorised funding for the construction of an official residence and works commenced in 1858. Architect Richard Roach Jewell as Superintendent of Public Works and Towns, designed the two-storey building, which was completed and occupied in 1864.

Between 1909 and 1913 Governor Strickland attempted to extend the grounds of the Governor's Residence forward to the sea-front and behind to Government House Lake. This would have prevented the residents of the settlement from walking in front of the Residence to get to the chapel, and so the extension was not permitted. After this the summer-time residence of the Governor was moved to Albany.

The Residence was converted to holiday accommodation in 1919 and in 1953 it opened as a hotel with a liquor licence. It has been known variously as the "Rottnest Hotel", "Quokka Arms" and as of 2015 "Hotel Rottnest".

Major modifications and extensions to the buildings have been made over the years, including the addition of several short-stay units for tourists and a modern bar/restaurant facility. The major architectural features of the Residence are still clearly prominent.

== Pilot Boathouse ==
Built 1858.

== Native Prison ==
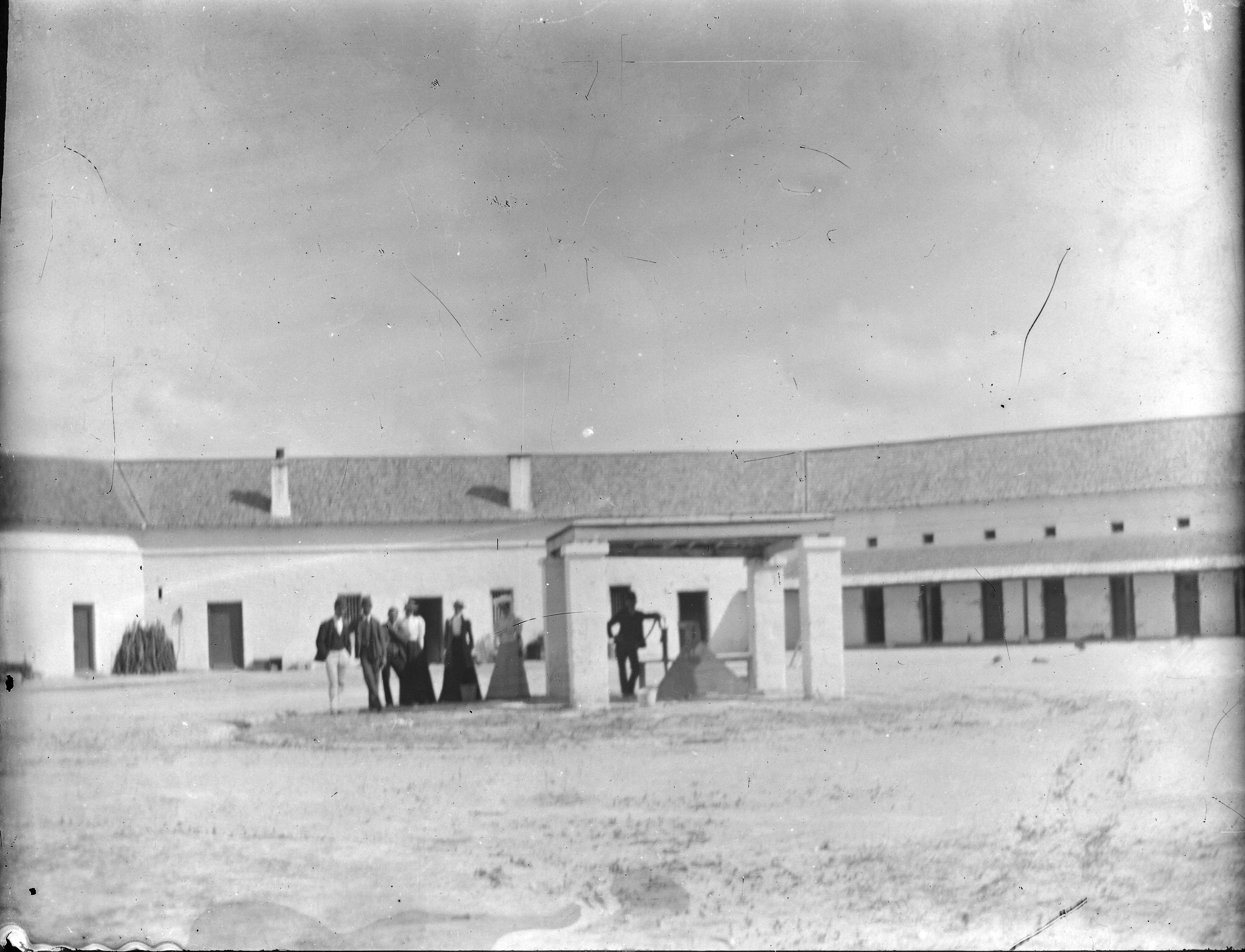
Visitors to the prison, c. 1900–1910

Built 1863-64.

Rottnest was used as a penal establishment for Aboriginal people between 1838 and 1931, except for the period 1849 to 1855. The Quod (quod meaning 'quadrangle', 'prison') replaced an earlier structure that was destroyed by a major fire in 1856. The only entrance faced east, towards to the superintendent's office. Rooms on either side of the entrance housed prison warders.

In 1883 a commission was set up to look at conditions for Aboriginal prisoners. The superintendent William Dockwrey Jackson gave evidence to this commission as to the conditions of the prisoners: "There are 36 cells[…]. I have had five natives in a 6 x 10 [1.8 m × 3.0 m] cell, but as a general rule there are only four."

Frederick Vosper, owner of the local Sunday Times newspaper visited the prison in 1899 and described it as follows:

The prison buildings are in the form of an octagon, of which about six sides are occupied by cells opening on a common courtyard, the remaining two consisting of offices, kitchen, etc. ... Around the interior of the octagonal courtyard runs a narrow verandah, with a boarded floor, which boards look like as if they had not been scrubbed or washed for a geological epoch. The cells are wretched little cubicles, apparently about 6ft. x 8ft [1.8 m × 2.4 m]. in extent, which are lighted only by a grating in the cell door, and one in the wall over it. The cubic air space must be very small not more than 300ft [8.5 m^{3}]. I should think and in there, black prisoners sleep on the bare boards, having a rug provided to cover them. ... I was informed by Dr. Hope that the rule is to put three men in a cell.

The prison closed in 1904 and in 1911 it was modified for holiday accommodation. Further modifications were made in 1986 when it became the Rottnest Lodge.

== Hay Store ==
Built 1863-64.

== Pilot Crew's Kitchen ==
Built 1867.

== Salt Store ==
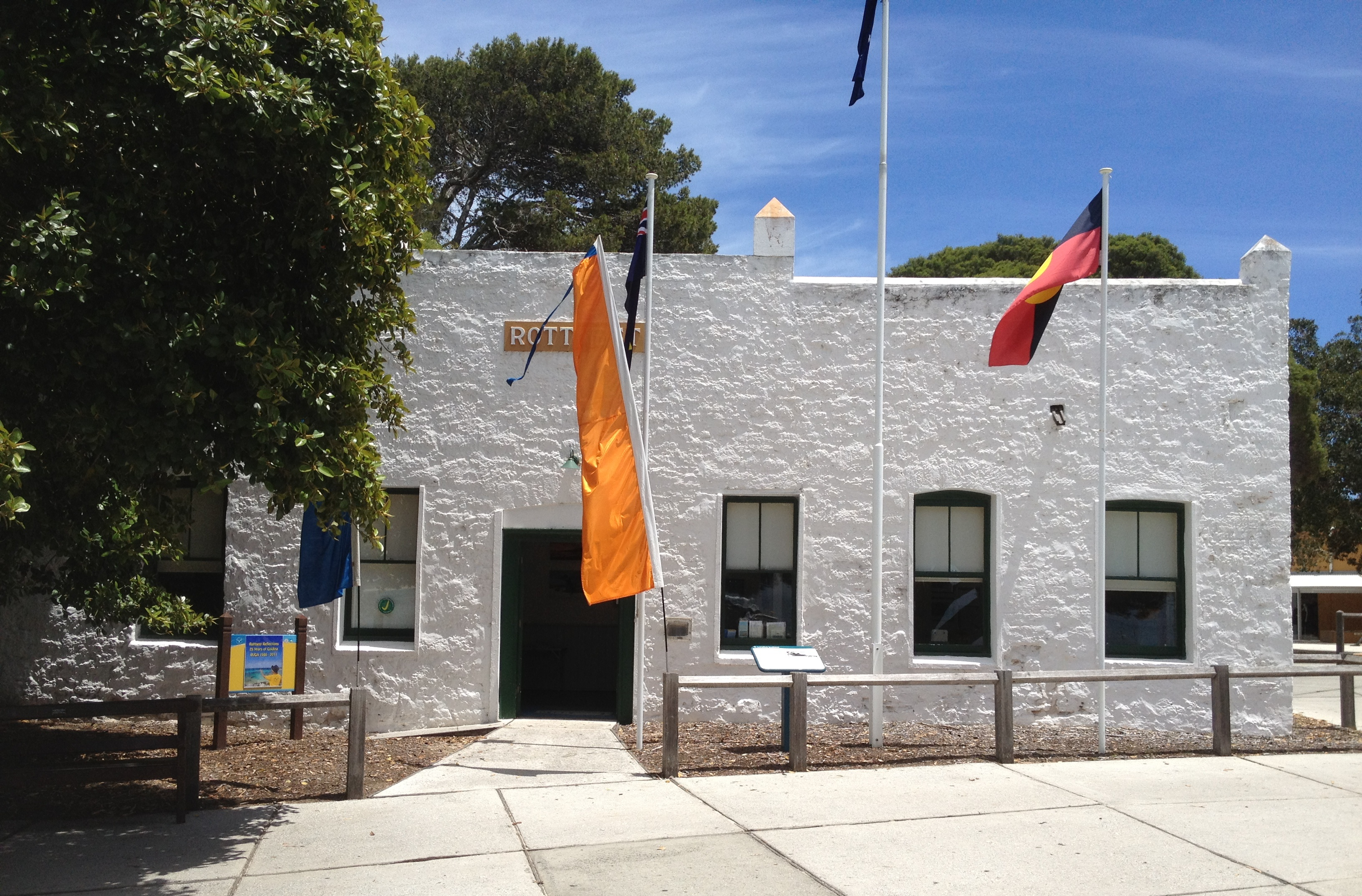
Salt Store

The Salt Store was built prior to 1880 for storage and bagging of the output of the Salt Works (situated on the eastern shore of Pearse Lakes, now demolished). The extant building is the second salt store, the first having been built in 1839 to the north of the First Superintendent's House. The building is about 17 by 6 metres (56 ft × 20 ft) and built into the hillside. It was originally one large room, but when converted for use as the post office in 1913 two internal walls were added, and modifications made to the east parapet. A toilet annex is attached to the southern rear corner, on a higher level. In the 1980s this building was occupied by the island engineer and ranger.

== Coxswain's Cottage ==
Built 1871.

== Lomas' Cottage ==
Built 1871. For John Lomas. Later used to house the Rottnest telephone exchange (the east wall was removed to aid the installation of this).

== Boy's Reformatory ==
Built 1880-81.

This is one of the few colonial buildings on Rottnest Island not constructed by Henry Vincent. John Watson built the structure and became the reformatory superintendent for all of its 20-years of operations to 1901.

The reformatory buildings are now used as holiday accommodation as part of the Rottnest Lodge.

Aboriginal boys and boys in trouble with the law were sent to this reformatory. Here they were taught carpentry, gardening and joinery.

== Wadjemup Lighthouse ==
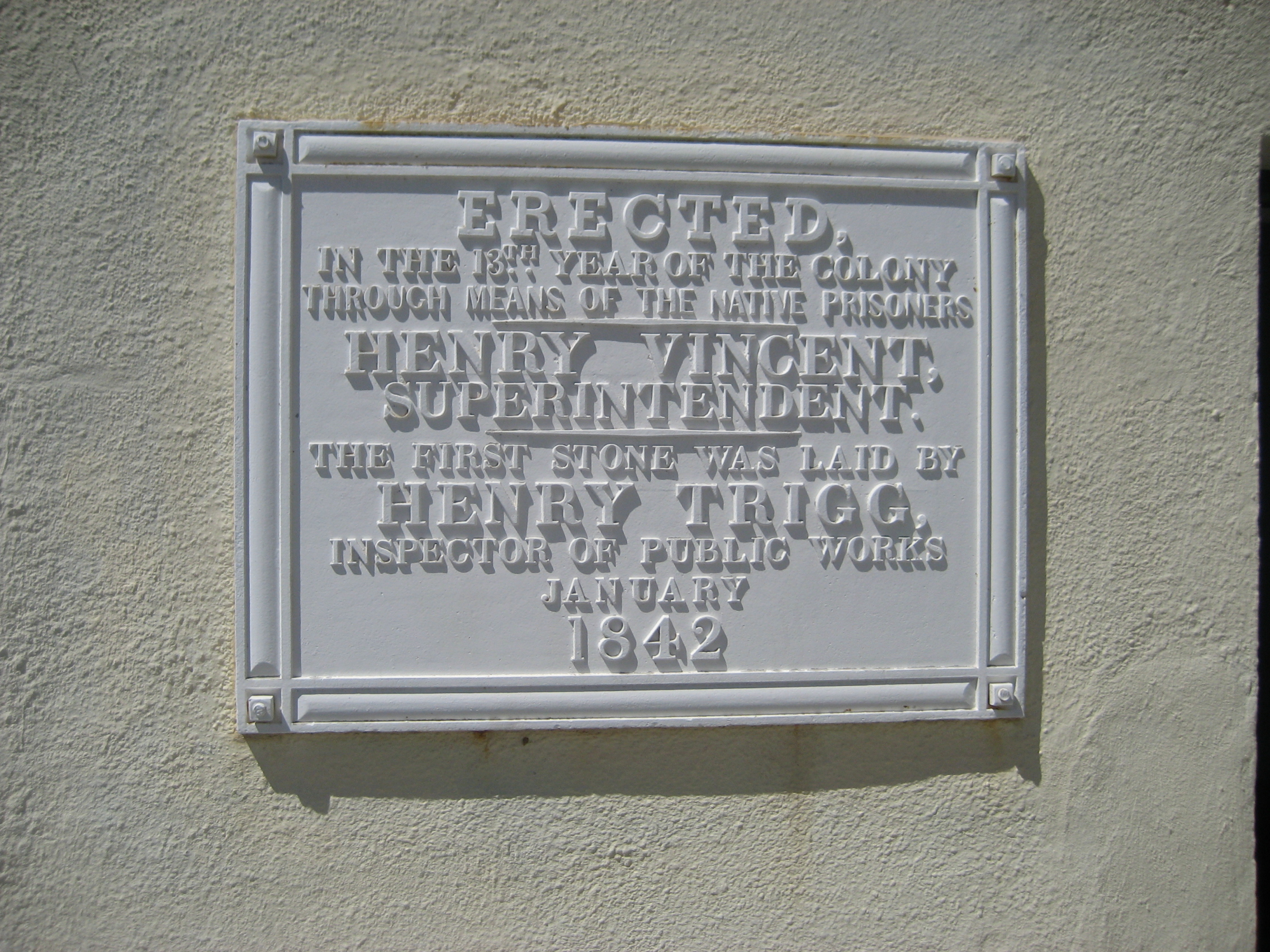
Wadjemup Lighthouse plaque

Built 1849 and 1896.

The current lighthouse stands on the site of a much smaller lighthouse built in 1849. Foundations of the original structure are nearby.

== General references ==
- Ferguson, Ronald Jack; Rottnest Island Authority (2004). A Guide to the Historic Buildings of the Thomson Bay Settlement, Rottnest Island. Fremantle: Rottnest Island Authority.
- Somerville, William (1949). Rottnest Island: Its History and Legends, Its Discovery and Development, Natural Beauties, Fauna, and Flora. Rottnest Board of Control.
- Somerville, William (1966). Rottnest Island in History and Legend: Its Discovery and Development, Natural Beauties, Fauna and Flora. Rottnest Island Board.

== Sources ==
- Ferguson, Ronald Jack (1986). Rottnest Island: History and Architecture. University of Western Australia Press. ISBN 978-0-85564-249-5.
- Seddon, George (1972). Sense of Place. Nedlands: UWA Publishing. ISBN 978-0-85564-058-3. LCCN 72188384. OCLC 35572047. Wikidata Q7450995.
