= Lake Baghdad =

Lake on Rottnest Island, Western Australia

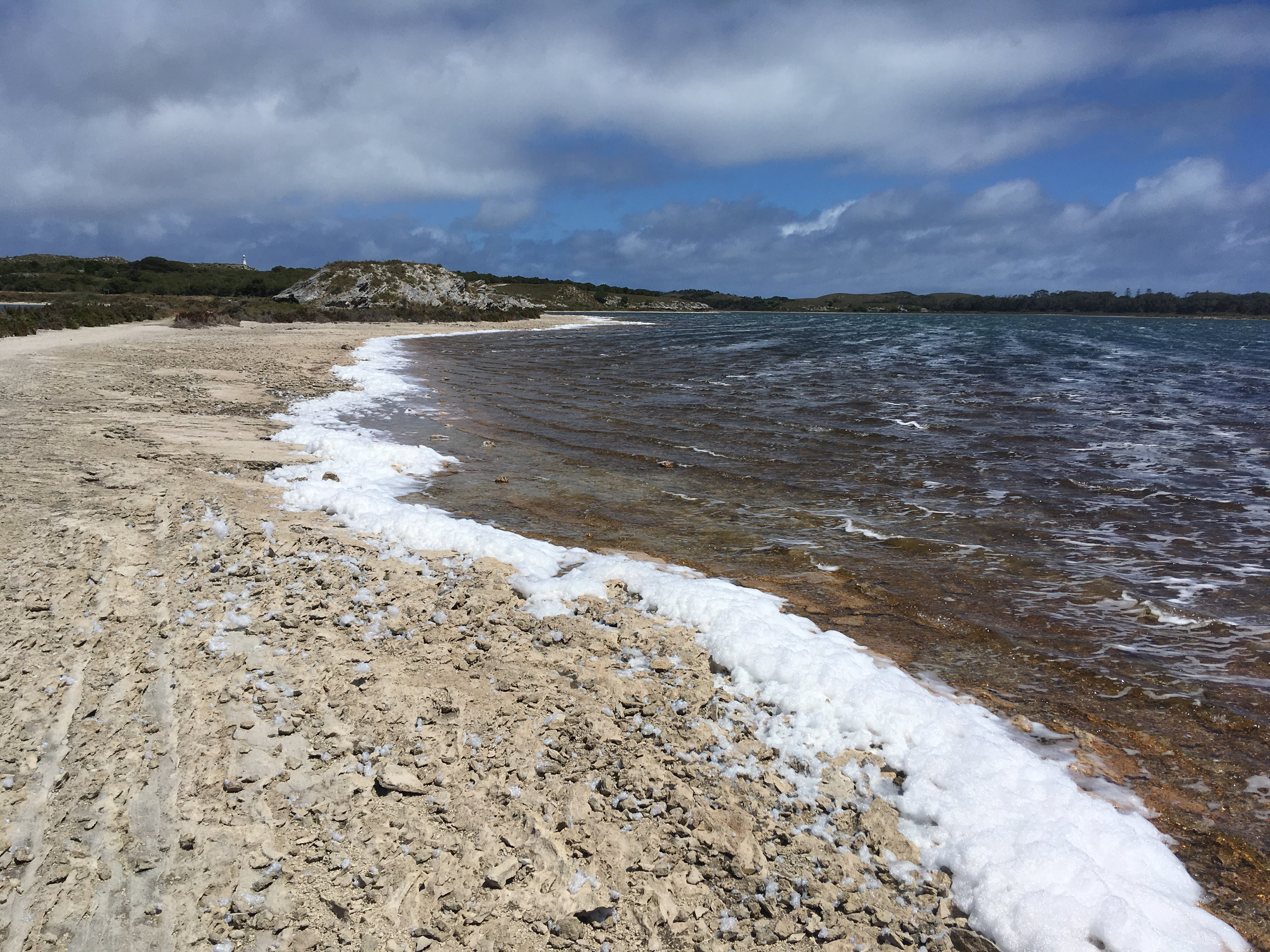

- Location within Western Australia
- Location: Rottnest Island, Western Australia
- Coordinates: 31.9961°S 115.5174°E
- Type: Salt lake
- Basin countries: Australia
- Max. length: 1.29 km (0.80 mi)
- Max. width: 0.71 km (0.44 mi)
- Islands: 2 islets
- Lake Baghdad is a salt lake on Rottnest Island.

Lake Baghdad is one of a collection of salt lakes on Rottnest Island, Western Australia.

Ten percent of the area of Rottnest Island is taken up by salt lakes, with Lake Baghdad, Herschel Lake, Garden Lake, Government House Lake and others being permanent and having their own surrounding beaches.

== See also ==
- Geographical features of Rottnest Island
- Government House Lake (Rottnest)
- List of lakes of Australia § Western Australia
