= Fish Hook Bay =

Bay on Rottnest Island, Western Australia

- Coordinates: 32°1′26″S 115°27′5″E

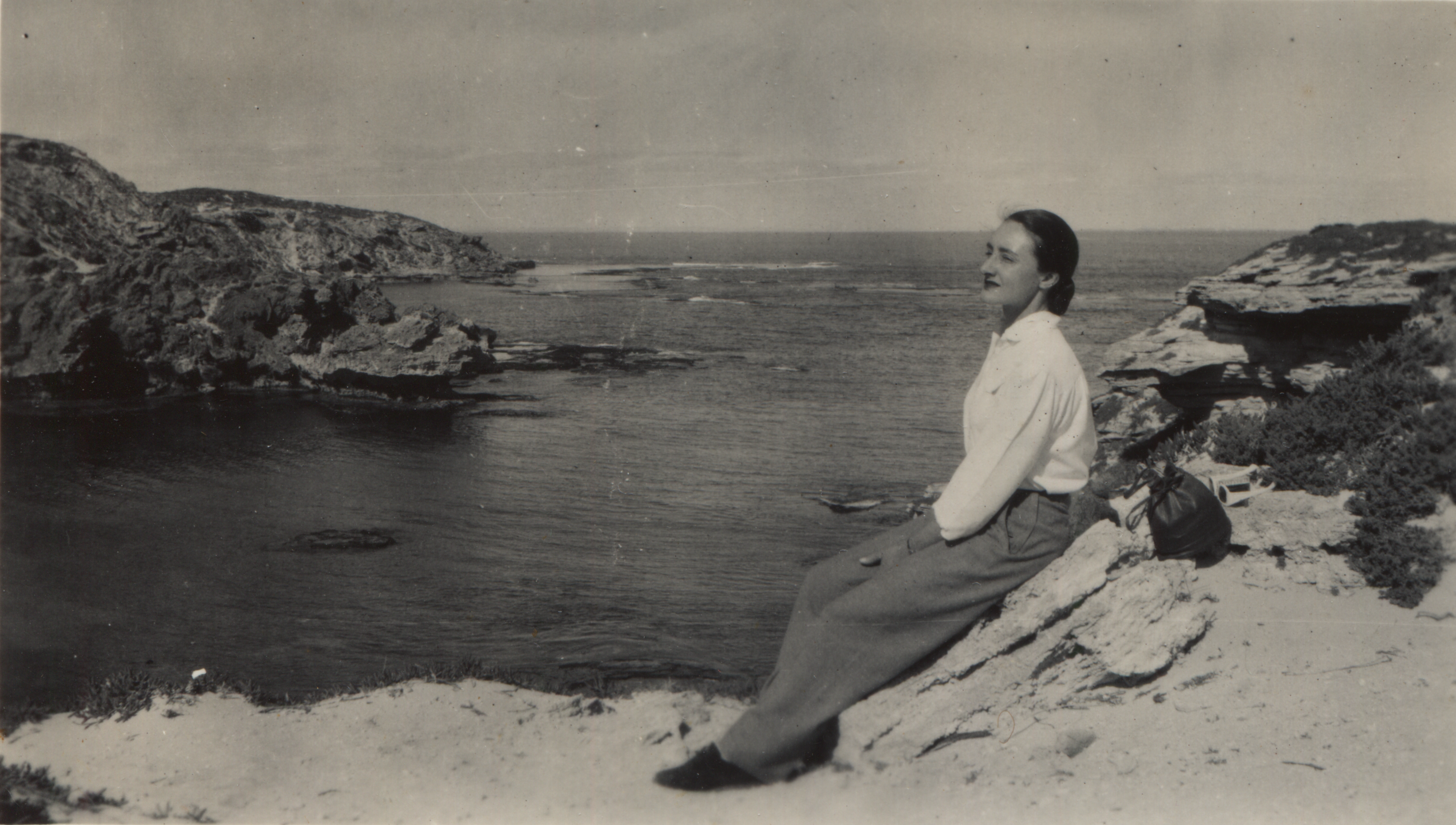
Portrait of a visitor at the bay in 1940s

Fish Hook Bay is a bay on Rottnest Island, in the Australian state of Western Australia. The bay is the westernmost bay on the island, and isolated from habitation, which occurs on the eastern side.

Fish Hook Bay takes its name from its shape, which resembles a fish hook. It was a location of mutton bird nests. It has also been the location of unusual fish catches, and research into marine species.

== Geography ==
Fish Hook Bay is 120 metres (390 ft) wide and 170 metres (560 ft) deep. It opens to the north. East of the bay is Wilson Bay and to the north is Eagle Bay, which is separated from Cape Vlaming by Fish Hook Bay. The bay's 430-metre-long (1,410 ft) shoreline does not have a beach.
