= Sense of Place =

Book by George Seddon

Sense of place
- Cover of 1st edition
- Author: George Seddon
- Language: English
- Genre: Non-fiction
- Publisher: University of Western Australia Press
- Publication date: 1972
- Publication place: Australia
- Media type: Print (hardback)
- Pages: 274
- ISBN: 0-85564-058-8
- OCLC: 35572047

Sense of place: a response to an environment: the Swan Coastal Plain, Western Australia is a 1972 book by George Seddon. It documents Seddon's struggle to understand the Swan Coastal Plain, a biogeographic region that he initially found harsh and unwelcoming. It includes information on landforms, climate, geology, soils, flora, the Swan River, the coast, offshore islands, wetlands, and urban areas. This information is, however, essentially presented in a literary style; in the words of Mark Tredinnick: "This is the kind of geography an essayist writes. This is the kind of essay a literate scientist writes. This is a literary natural history."

In Australia it is considered a landmark environmental publication. Among its claims to influence is having given modern currency to the term sense of place. Although Seddon did not coin the phrase, it was this book that introduced the phrase into the fields of landscape and environmental design.
