= Government House Lake (Rottnest) =

Lake on Rottnest Island, Western Australia

Coordinates: 32°00′10″S 115°32′17″E

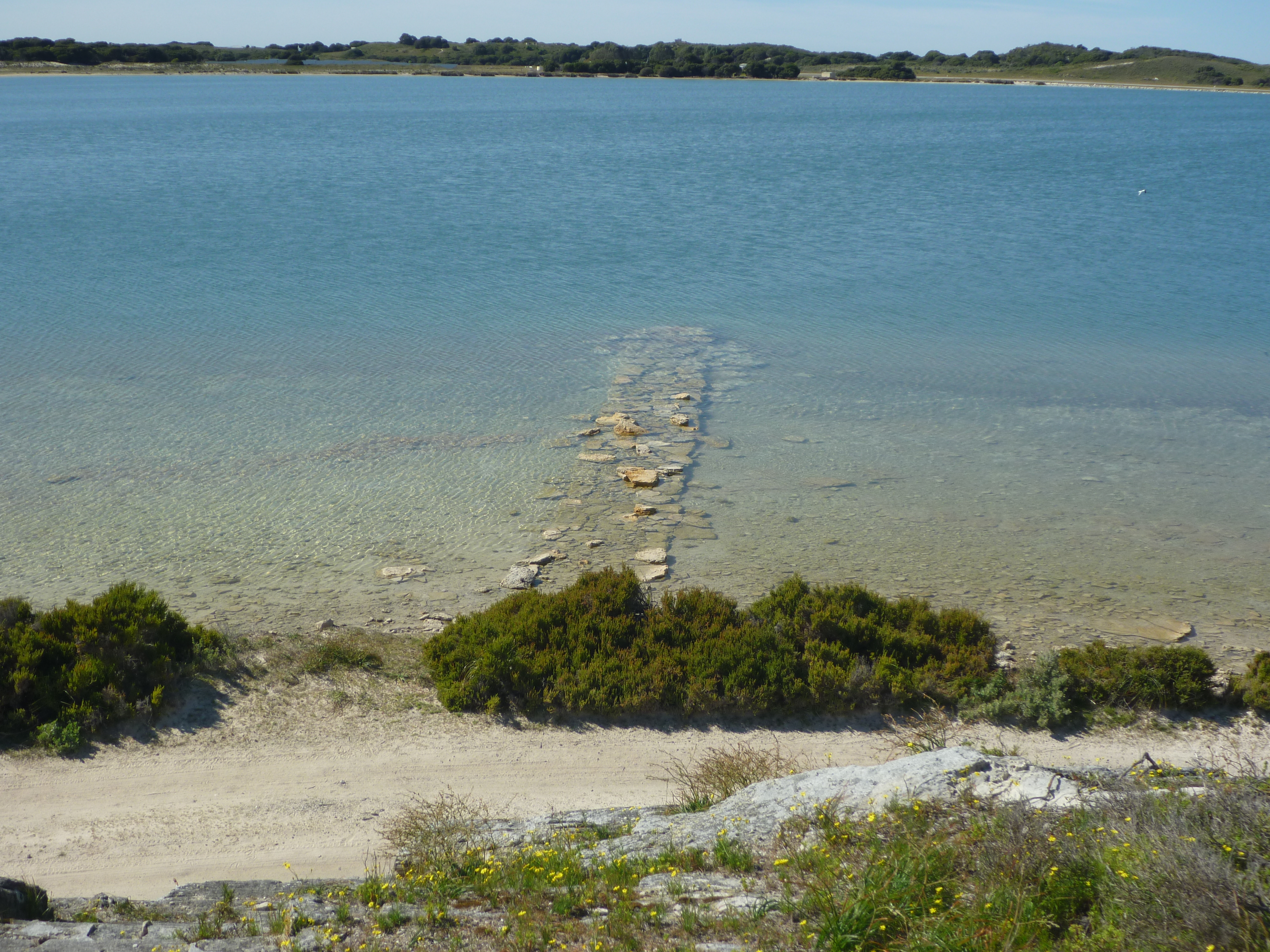
The view south over Government House Lake, with the stone jetty visible in the foreground.

Government House Lake is a saline lake on Rottnest Island in Western Australia. It is partly reclaimed on its southern shore, for the Rottnest Island Airport. Adjacent lakes are Pearse Lakes to the west, Serpentine Lake to the south west, and Herschell and Garden Lakes to the north.

Government House Lake is a salt lake on Rottnest Island.

The Government House Lake, and the other lakes of Rottnest are often mentioned in passing, in anecdotal reminiscences about the island.

Various features have been constructed since European settlement of the Island in the 1800s. In the 1930s a stone jetty was constructed (also identified as "old bathing groyne" on recent maps), with steps leading down to it cut into the limestone cliff. Apart from the airport it also had a wartime railway, and recent tourist railway run south of its shore.

In the 1920s yachting occurred on the lake.

In 1930 a Klemm aeroplane facilitated the first aerial photographs of the island and the lake.

== See also ==
- Lake Baghdad
