= George Seddon (academic) =

Australian academic and author

- Born: 23 April 1927
- Died: 9 May 2007 (aged 80); Fremantle, Western Australia
- Citizenship: Australian
- Awards: Robin Boyd Environmental Awards (Three times); 1995 Eureka Prize; 1996 Academy of Science Mawson Medal
- Scientific career
- Fields: Environmental
- Workplaces: University of NSW; University of Melbourne; University of Western Australia

George Seddon AM (23 April 1927 – 9 May 2007) was an Australian academic who held university chairs in a range of subjects. He wrote popular books on the Australian landscape embracing diverse points of view. He was well known for his book Sense of Place (1972) which brought the needs of the fragile Swan Coastal Plain to the attention of the public.

At the time of his death, he was Senior Honorary Research Fellow English, Communication and Cultural Studies at the University of Western Australia Perth, Western Australia and Emeritus Professor of Environmental Science at the University of Melbourne.

== Biography ==
Seddon held AM; BA (Hons); MSc; PhD, University of Minnesota; Hon DLit, University of Western Australia; Hon FAILA; Hon FRAPI; FTS.

Seddon studied English at the University of Melbourne, and later received an MSc and a PhD in Geology at the University of Minnesota. He held the Chair of History and Philosophy of Science at the University of NSW and later became Director of the Centre for Environmental Studies and the Dean of Architecture and Planning at Melbourne University. Across five decades he held Chairs in four different disciplines (English, UWA; Geology, Oregon; History and Philosophy of Science, UNSW; Environmental Science, Melbourne) and taught at universities in Lisbon, Toronto, Bologna, Rome, Venice, Minnesota and Oregon.

Seddon published 217 papers and numerous books, many of which have won awards. These awards include three Robin Boyd Environmental Awards, the Eureka Prize from the Australian Museum in 1995, for the Snowy book, and the Mawson Medal from the Academy of Science, in 1996.

He was an Honorary Fellow of both the Royal Australian Planning Institute and the Australian Institute of Landscape Architects; Fellow of the Australian Academy of Technological Sciences and Engineering; and an Honorary Fellow of the Australian Academy of the Humanities. In 1998 he became a Member of the Order of Australia; in 2000 he was made an Honorary Doctor of Literae Humaniores by the University of Western Australia, and in December, a Festschrift was organised jointly by ANU, La Trobe, Murdoch and UWA universities, with delegates from other institutions. He was made citizen of the Year in Fremantle for 2001.

He was involved in a number of issues relating to planning, and decisions about historic buildings, he was involved in the process of saving the buildings that make up the Fremantle Arts Centre.

Seddon died in his Fremantle home on 9 May 2007.

== Bibliography ==
=== Books ===
- Swan River Landscapes (Perth: University of Western Australia Press. 1970)
- Seddon, George (1972), Sense of Place, Nedlands: UWA Publishing, ISBN 978-0-85564-058-3, LCCN 72188384, OCLC 35572047, Wikidata Q7450995
- Man and landscape in Australia: towards an ecological vision (Aust. UNESCO Committee for Man and the Biosphere, pub No. 2, Canberra: Australian Government Publishing Service, 1976)
- Seddon, George; Ravine, David (1986). A City and its Setting: Images of Perth, Western Australia. Fremantle: Fremantle Press. ISBN 0-949206-08-3. LCCN 87131959. OCLC 16866226. OL 2438825M. Wikidata Q135222492.
- Searching for the Snowy: an Environmental History. (St Leonards, Sydney: Allen and Unwin, 1994)
- Swan Song: reflections on Perth and Western Australia 1956 -1995 (Centre for Studies in Australian Literature: University of Western Australia, 1995)
- Landprints: Reflections on Place and Landscape (Cambridge: Cambridge University Press, 1997)
- Looking at an Old Suburb: A Walking Guide to Four Blocks of Fremantle with Barbara Haddy (Fremantle Arts Centre Press, 2000)
- Garnett, T. R. (2001). George Seddon (ed.). From the country: an anthology. Melbourne: Bloomings Books.
- The Old Country: Australian Landscapes, Plants and People (Cambridge University Press, 2005)

=== Articles, chapters and other contributions ===
- "The Nature of Nature" in Westerly (Issue 36:4, pp. 7–14, 1991)
- "The Australian Back Yard" in Australian Popular Culture ed. Ian Craven. (Cambridge: Cambridge University Press, 1994)
- "Return to Portugal" in Best Essays of 1998, edited by Peter Craven (Melbourne: Bookman Press, 1998)
- "Imagining the West" in Imagining Australia, ed. Silvia Albertazzi, Sheila M. Downing, Monica Turci. (Rome: Vecchiarelli Editore, 1998)
- "Land and Language" in Meanjin (Issue 58:2, pp 140–152, 1999)
- "Saving the Throwaway River" in Australian Geographical Studies (Issue 37:3, pp 314–321, 1999)
- "Alien Invaders" in The Mediterranean Garden (Issue 18: pp 42–45, 1999)
- "The Mediterranean Garden in Australia" in The Mediterranean Garden (Issue 17: pp 18–26, 1999)
- Seddon, George (March 2003). "Groundswell". Correspondence. Quarterly Essay. 9: 107–108.

== Radio appearances ==
- Interview regarding "Searching for the Snowy" in 'Green and Practical' programme (ABC Radio National. Broadcast 12 November 1994)
