= Franz Boos =

Austrian gardener-botanist

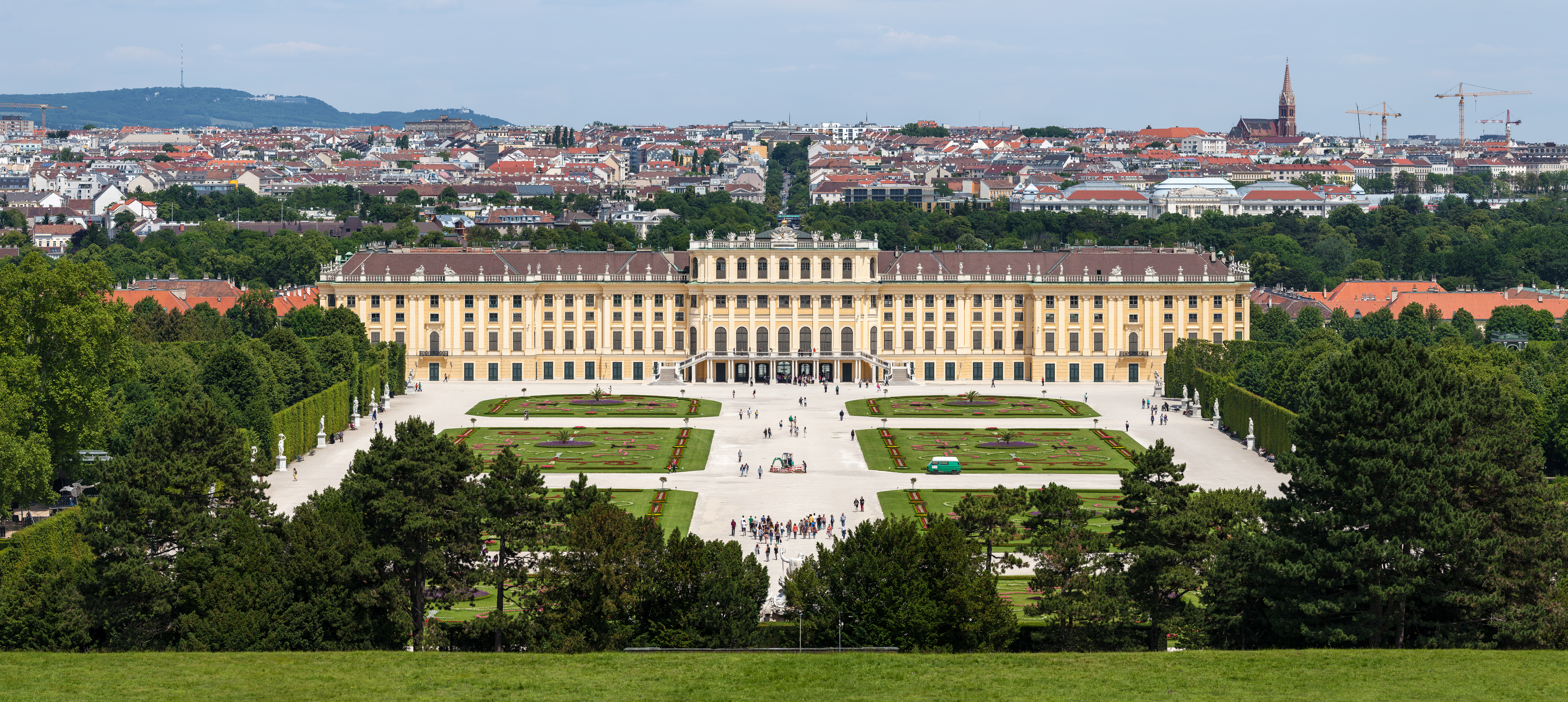
Schönbrunn Palace & city of Vienna, view from Gloriette Inscribed as a UNESCO World Heritage Site in 1996

Franz Boos (23 December 1753 in Frauenalb – 9 February 1832 in Vienna) was an Austrian gardener-botanist in the Age of Enlightenment, a voyager and collector of natural history specimens for Emperor Joseph II of Austria, who reigned from 1765 to 1790.

Boos came from a gardening family that lived in the Grand Duchy of Baden, his father being head gardener in Rastatt, his son Joseph Boos (1794–1879) being an assistant gardener at the Schönbrunn Palace. Franz began his career in 1771 as a gardener to Prince Leopold of Dietrichstein in Seelowitz (Moravia). From 1774 to 1775 he worked at the famous gardens of Prince Johann I of Liechtenstein in Lednice (also in Moravia) then, in 1776, he became assistant gardener at the Imperial and Royal Court Gardens of Schönbrunn Palace in Vienna.

Franz Boos is best known for successful voyages to America, the Caribbean and South Africa during which he collected a wide range of natural history specimens for the parks and gardens, menagerie, and Cabinet of the Emperor's palace at Schönbrunn. The Emperor had appointed Franz Joseph Märter (1753–1827) as organiser and leader of this voyage of scientific exploration. Franz Boos, an under-gardener at the time, was selected as the primary collector specialising in tropical plants for the greenhouses. When Boos sailed to the Isle de France (now Mauritius) and Bourbon (Reunion), he was a passenger of the then unknown merchant sailor Nicolas Baudin. The knowledge gained from Austrian Boos was later combined with French horticultural and botanical expertise which lead Baudin to the forefront of scientific exploration and research as the century moved into the upheaval of Revolutionary Wars. He worked at the Jardin du Roi, Pamplemousses, with Nicolas Céré and at Palma with Joseph-François Charpentier de Cossigny.

In recognition of his work, Boos was eventually promoted to the position of Director of the Royal Parks and Gardens at the Schönbrunn palace.

== Botanical and horticultural exploration ==
Boos traveled on two major scientific expeditions on behalf of Emperor Joseph II, the first was to America (1783–1785), the second to the Caribbean, Cape of South Africa and Mascarenes (1786–1788).

=== America and Caribbean Bahamas 1783–1785 ===
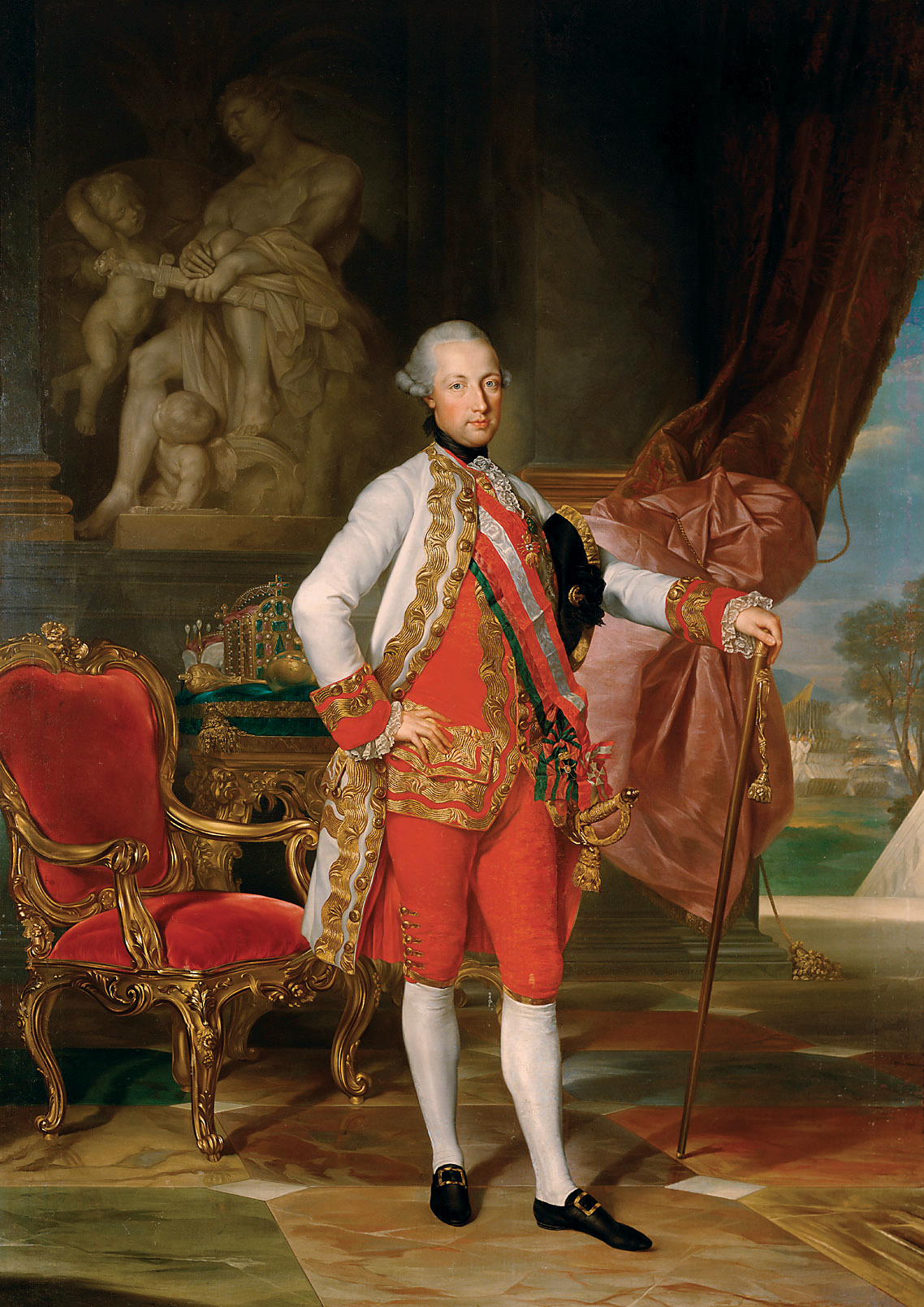
Emperor Joseph II (1741 – 1790)

Following a request from the Emperor Joseph II to the botanist Nikolaus Jacquin (Director of the Botanical Garden of the University of Vienna and the Imperial Gardens of Schönbrunn Palace) and Ignaz von Born, a voyage was commissioned in the spring of 1783 to collect specimens (including live animals) from the southeastern United States, staying in Pennsylvania, South Carolina, New Jersey and eastern Florida. The expedition was led by naturalist Franz Joseph Märter who was accompanied by the botanist Matthias Leopold Stupicz, a gardener's assistant Franz Bredemeyer and the painter Adam Moll. The naturalists were initially to go as part of an Austrian round the world voyage dedicated to scientific research. This had been urged by the eminent savant, Ignaz von Born who, at the Emperor’s invitation, nominated five naturalists to go on the Cobenzell, a ship owned by William Bolts. The intended Imperial expedition was reported in the German press in July 1782:

The all-encompassing mind of the Kaiser attracts every kind of merit. While he abolishes the old abuses, gives new laws and makes happy his people, he also recognizes how much the sciences and useful arts contribute to the benefit of the state. In accordance with these ideas, he has caused several savants and artists, the Sub-director of the Natural History Cabinet, Heydinger, the Professor of Natural History, Märter, the Palace Gardiner, Boos, and the Imperial Painter, Moll, to undertake a voyage round the world through the several lands of the two Indies, to perfect the various branches of natural science and to make new discoveries and observations in these fields. The ship designated for this illustrious expedition, the Graf von Cobenzl, will be supplied with necessaries and be in readiness by the beginning of August.

This voyage did not take place, and Märter and his companions sailed from Le Havre for Philadelphia in 1783 on the General Washington. In March 1784 Boos traveled with Märter to the island of Providence in the Bahamas, and from there on collecting trips to Guanahani and other islands. In September he left the island group, returning to Charleston in South Carolina, sending his collections (mostly live plants) back to Vienna in May 1785 and returning himself to Vienna via Holland in September 1785. At Charleston in South Carolina Boos collected many rare plants.

Greenhouses at Schönbrunn already displayed an impressive collection of plants from the Jacquin's explorations in the Antilles and South America made from 1754 to 1759. However, in 1780 there had been a heating failure that had frozen this famous collection of exotic plants which now needed expanding.

=== South Africa, Bourbon and Isle de France 1786–1788 ===
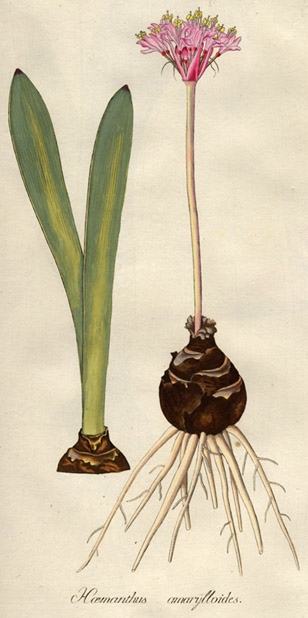
Haemanthus amarylloides Jacq. One of the plants collected at the Cape of South Africa by Franz Boos and Georg Scholl and described by Nikolaus Jacquin

On his return he was almost immediately sent by Jacquin on a second mission to South Africa in October 1785, this time as leader. His assistant gardener was Georg Scholl from Weilbach. The visit lasted from May 1786 to February 1787 during which he was often accompanied by the Scotsman Francis Masson in the Cape Swartland and semi-desert Karoo, collecting live plants, bulbs, seeds, birds, insects and more. From the beginning of 1787 he traveled to the foothills of the Cape of Good Hope and from April 1787 to several islands, including Ile-de-France (Mauritius) and Bourbon (Réunion). George Scholl remained there until 1798 and did not return to Vienna until 1799 while Boos left Cape Town in August 1788 with more than three hundred cases of plants for the herbarium of the Imperial Court Natural History Cabinet (now the Vienna Natural History Museum). Among the plants were several replicates of the Cape Lily (Veltheimia capensis), whose bulbs were propagated, their descendants now on display in the "Desert House (Sundial House)" in the Schönbrunn Zoo. A Fockea capensis (family Euphorbiaceae) was also collected from this expedition: it is the oldest cultivated in a pot of succulents in the world. Boos also brought twelve living mammals and around 250 birds. Many of the species were subsequently described by Jacquin with illustrations. After finishing his work with Märten and his men in North America Boos was sent to South Africa, the Mascarenes and Madagascar. He travelled from the Cape to Isle de France, and from there to Trieste carrying the natural history collections on the Pepita. In the course of future work for Schönbrunn he left in Trinidad pepper, vegetables and other plants from Malabar and SE Asia.

Boos was evidently the leader as he was well educated, spoke several languages and was a botanist as well as a gardener, whereas Scholl was a working gardener with little scientific knowledge. Joseph II’s intention was for them to make collections of tropical plants from Isle de France, but bad weather forced their ship to shelter at the Cape of Good Hope delaying their departure. Many South African plants were collected, on one occasion together with the Scottish gardener-botanist Francis Masson from Kew Gardens in London. Boos eventually travelled on to Mauritius leaving Scholl behind to continue collecting, returning to the Cape in 1788 for a few months before leaving for Vienna in July 1788 with a large collection of specimens and living plants. Scholl remained at the Cape for twelve years unable to get passage on a ship that was prepared to transport his plant collections. At the Cape Scholl was assisted by Colonel Robert Jacob Gordon who gave him protection, assisted him with his field excursions and allowed him to grow his plants in his garden, often referred to in the literature as ‘the Gordon’s Garden’. Many plants were established in this garden and Scholl collected their seed. Scholl sent several shipments of dried bulbs and seeds to Vienna, four of these being recorded in the Cape Archives in the period 1790 to 1792.

Plants were shipped to the Austrian Consul in Holland who then forwarded them upriver and overland to Vienna. Scholl eventually returned to Vienna in 1799 with his large collection of living plants and seed from Erica species. Present-day botanist Dr Kiehn and staff at the Schönbrunn Botanical Gardens believe that the ericas now growing at the Belvedere Palace Garden date back over 200 years to the Boos and Scholl collections as there is no evidence of any other collections being grown. Both the Belvedere Palace and Schönbrunn Palace Gardens were damaged by bombing at the end of the Second World War but though most of the glasshouse plants were destroyed at the end of the war many survived because they were purposely propagated for other gardens and glasshouses.

After Boos left the Isle de France and Pamplemousses, the garden's Director Jean-Nicolas Céré hosted, from July 1788 to March 1789, Joseph Martin an 'élève-gardener' under he charge of André Thouin Head Gardener of the Jardin du Roi. He was to send spice and other plants to acclimatize in Paris, Cayenne and Antilles gardens. But he also managed to botanize on Madagascar and the Cape. With the successful conclusion of his journey Martin was appointed Director of the acclimatisation garden at Cayenne.

== Association with Nicolas Baudin ==
When Boos travelled from the Cape to Isle de France, and from there to Trieste carrying the natural history collections it was on the ship Pepita commanded by Nicolas Baudin, at that time a merchant mariner. Baudin was interested in the collections which included many specimens from the Pamplemousses Botanical Garden on the Isle de France (Mauritius). From Boos Baudin learned much about the transport of live plants and animals and the storage of natural history specimens, knowledge that he would later use in the scientific exploration of New Holland (Australia), and elsewhere, for Napoleon. The arrival of the Pepita, under its formal name, Josepha, was reported in the press:

Vienna, 21 July. According to letters from Trieste, the French freighter Josepha, Cap. Boudin, coming from the East Indies has anchored in the harbour there with various animals and plants for the Emperor's menagerie at Schoenbrunn, for his gardens and for his Natural History Cabinet. These animals and plants have been collected by order of His Majesty with the greatest care by Mr. Boos, Imperial Court Gardener, which he has sought out in the Isles of France and Bourbon, in Madagascar and at the Cape of Good Hope.

== Plant collections ==
Boos collected in Europe, Austria, South Africa, Madagascar, Pennsylvania, South Carolina and the West Indies his collections probably in the British Museum of Natural Historia and Vienna.

Haemanthus amarylloides Jacq. is an endemic South African bulbous plant first described in 1804 by Nikolaus Joseph von Jacquin from specimens sent to the Schönbrunn Palace gardens by Boos and Scholl.In 1799 a cycad was collected by Georg Scholl on the Cape, this being returned to Vienna where, in 1801, it was described and illustrated as Zamia cycadifolia by botanist Jaquin.

== Other achievements and honours ==
On his return from Africa, Boos replaced Jacquin as Director of the Schönbrunn parks and gardens. After the death of Richard van der Schot, and because of his achievements, in 1790 Emperor Leopold II appointed Boos Director of the Schönbrunn Menagerie and the so-called "Dutch Palace Garden", then in 1807 Director of all the Courtyards. In 1810 he was admitted to the Imperial Council to eventually retire in 1827. Boos’s successor as Director of the Courtyard Gardens and Menagerie at Schönbrunn was Bredemeyer who, in 1793 was appointed Head Gardener, a post he held from 1827 until his death in 1839. Apart from his many plant and animal introductions Boos also prepared a plan of the courtyard gardens of Schönbrunn in 1780 shortly after they had been completed. Together with his son Joseph Boos, also a keen gardener and botanist at Schönbrunn he published, in 1816, a catalogue of the cultivated and wild plants grown during his time at Schönbrunn (Schönbrunn's flora, the cultivated plants of the Royal Dutch botanical courtyard garden at Schönbrunn (published by Geistinger, Vienna and Trieste). The later Düsseldorf garden artist Maximilian Friedrich Weyhe while training as a gardener studied with Franz Boos in Vienna. Boos was a childhood friend of Peter Joseph Elder a senior gardener since 1788 in Brühl (Rhineland) and Head of the Botanical Garden of the University of Bonn and gave his son Peter Joseph (who later became famous landscape gardener) a job at Schönbrunn. In 1905 Franz Boos Lane in Hietzing, Vienna, was named after him.

== See also ==
- List of gardener-botanist explorers of the Enlightenment
- European and American voyages of scientific exploration
- Plantarum Rariorum Horti Caesarei Schoenbrunnensis (4 volumes, 1797–1804) Nicolas Jaquin's catalogue of plants held in the collections at the Schönbrunn Palace of Emperor Joseph II in Vienna between 1797 and 1804.

== Bibliography ==
- „Franz Boos, Director der k.k. Hofgärten“, Österreichisches Archiv für Geschichte, Erdbeschreibung, Staatenkunde, Kunst und Literatur, 38, 29 Marz 1832, S.150-151, 31 Marz 1832, S.152-153, 42, 7 April 1832, S.166-167.
- Kisling jr, Vernon N (1998). "Colonial menageries and the exchange of exotic faunas". Archives of Natural History. 25 (3): 303–320. doi:10.3366/anh.1998.25.3.303.
- Franz Boos In: Austrian Biographical Dictionary 1815-1950 (ABL). Volume 1. Vienna: Austrian Academy of Sciences. 1957. p. 10.
- Horner, Frank (1987). The French Reconnaissance: Baudin in Australia 1801–1803. Melbourne: Melbourne University Press. ISBN 0-522-84339-5.
- Kronfeld, Moritz (1891). "Zur Geschichte des Shönbrunner-Gartens". Wiener Zeitung. 210 (15): 2.
- King, Robert J (2008). "William Bolts and the Austrian Origins of the Lapérouse Expedition". Terrae Incognitae. 40: 1–28. doi:10.1179/tin.2008.40.1.1. S2CID 128626457.
- Ly-Tio-Fane, Madeleine (1991). "A reconnaissance of tropical resources during Revolutionary years: the role of the Paris Museum d'Histoire Naturelle". Archives of Natural History. 18 (3): 333–362. doi:10.3366/anh.1991.18.3.333.
- Ly-Tio-Fane, Madeleine (1996). "Botanic gardens: connecting links in plant transfer between the Indo-Pacific and Caribbean regions". Harvard Papers in Botany. 8: 7–14.
- Reichardt, Heinrich W (1876). Duncker & Humblot (ed.). Franz Boos. General German Biography. Vol. 3. Leipzig: Historical Commission of the Bavarian Academy of Sciences. p. 138.
- Snijman, Deidré (1984). The Genus Haemanthus: A Revision. National Botanic Gardens of South Africa. ISBN 0-620-07339-X.
- Urban, Ignatius (1964). Symbolae Antillanae Volume 3 (repr. of 1902 publication). Amsterdam: A. Asher & Co. pp. 25–26.
- Whitelock, Lauren M (2003). The Cycads. Portland Oregon: Timber Press. ISBN 0-88192-522-5.
