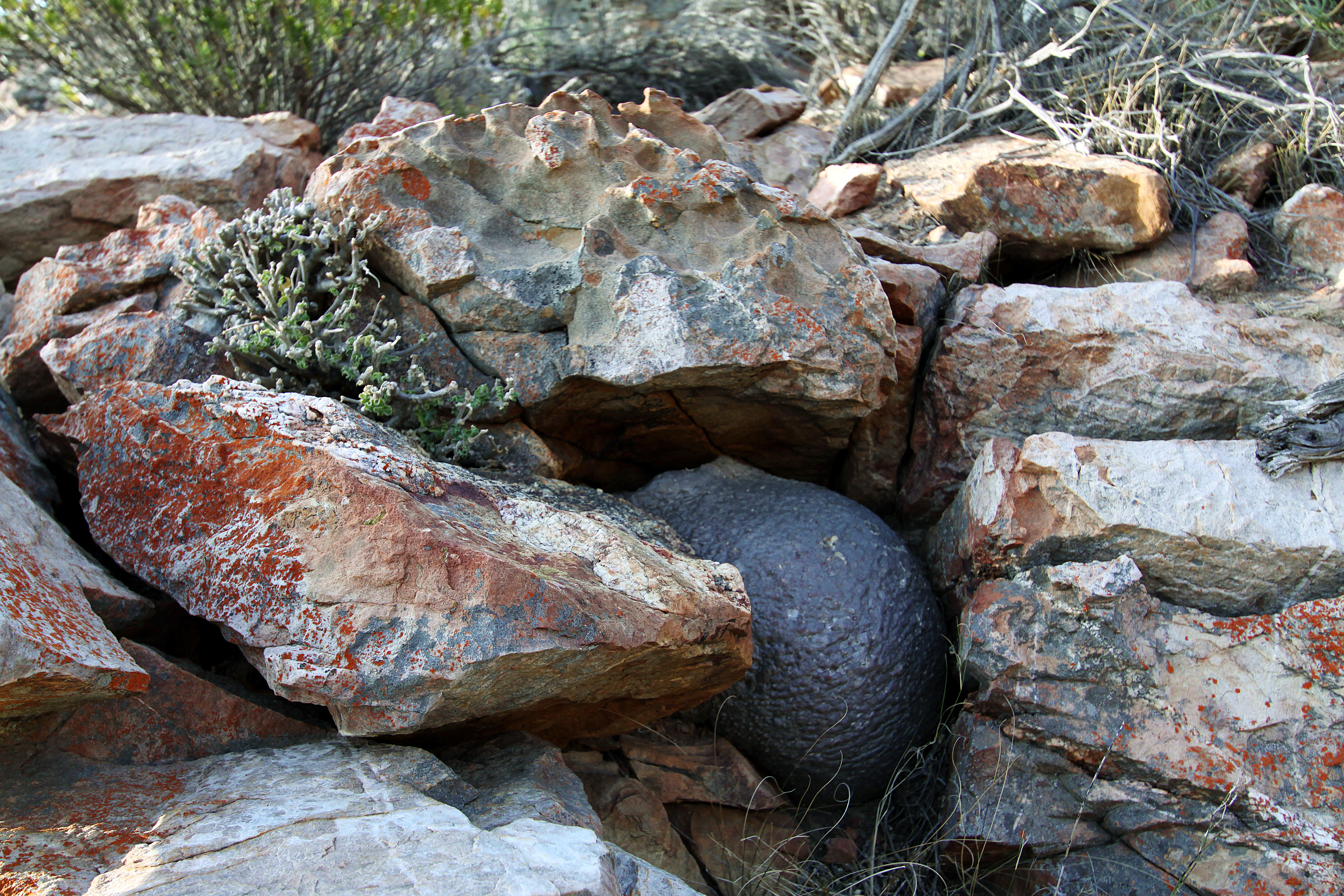
- Fockea capensis, Western Cape, South Africa

Scientific classification
- Kingdom: Plantae
- Clade: Tracheophytes
- Clade: Angiosperms
- Clade: Eudicots
- Clade: Asterids
- Order: Gentianales
- Family: Apocynaceae
- Subfamily: Asclepiadoideae
- Tribe: Fockeeae
- Genus: Fockea; Endl.

Synonyms
- Chymocormus Harv. (1842)

= Fockea =

Genus of flowering plants

Fockea is a genus of succulent scrubs native to Africa south of the equator. They are members of the Asclepiadoideae (milkweeds), a subfamily of the dogbane family Apocynaceae. Of the six accepted species, only the two most widely distributed extend north of southern Africa, with F. multiflora reaching as far north as Tanzania and F. angustifolia reaching to southern Kenya. Fockea are known as water roots, a reference to the bulbous caudex characteristic of most species, which is also edible in at least some species.

== Taxonomy ==
The genus Fockea Endl. was established in 1838 by the Austrian botanist Stephan Ladislaus Endlicher through illustration and description of a specimen of Fockea capensis collected in Cape Colony circa 1786 by Franz Boos and Georg Scholl and cultivated at Schönbrunn Garden in Vienna. The genus was named after the German physician and naturalist Gustav Woldemar Focke, author of the commentary De respiratione vegetabilium (Of the respiration of vegetables). The "Old Lady of Schönbrunn" — the oldest potted succulent in cultivation — continued to be cultivated at least through 1988, over 200 years after it was first collected by Boos and Scholl. It was believed to be the last surviving member of its species until the South African botanist Rudolf Marloth collected another specimen of F. capensis near Prince Albert in 1906.

Most Fockea species are relatively small climbers with swollen, mostly subterranean tubers, whereas Fockea multiflora, a widely distributed but exclusively tropical species, is a massive, tropical liana without a tuber. It is considered a sister to the other five species. Fockea angustifolia, also widely distributed, is mainly tropical, and sister to the remaining four species, which are endemic to southern Africa.

Species

1. Fockea angustifolia K.Schum. — A climbing tuberous geophyte found primarily in the seasonally dry tropical biome, ranging from Southeast Kenya to South Africa.
2. Fockea capensis Endl. — A climbing tuberous geophyte found primarily in the subtropical biome; its native range is the southern Cape Provinces of South Africa. According to Jacobsen, the turnip-shaped tuber can be up to 3 m (9.8 ft) diameter.
3. Fockea comaru (E.Mey.) N.E.Br. - A tuberous geophyte found primarily in the desert or dry shrubland biome, ranging from southern Namibia to South Africa's Cape Provinces.
4. Fockea edulis (Thunb.) K.Schum. - A climbing tuberous geophyte found primarily in the subtropical biome, ranging from the southern Cape Provinces to KwaZulu-Natal in South Africa.
5. Fockea multiflora K.Schum. - A semisucculent liana growing primarily in the seasonally dry tropical biome, ranging from Tanzania to northern Namibia.
6. Fockea sinuata (E.Mey.) Druce - A climbing tuberous geophyte growing primarily in the desert or dry shrubland biome, ranging from south-central and southern Namibia to the Cape Provinces and Free State province of South Africa.
