= Joseph Martin (gardener) =

Joseph Martin (fl. 1788–c.1819) was an Enlightenment gardener-botanist and plant collector who worked at the Jardin du Roi in Paris. He was sent on collecting expeditions to the Isle de France (now Mauritius), Madagascar, Cape of Good Hope and Caribbean.

== Gardener-botanists in the Enlightenment ==
During the Enlightenment, both France and England organised elaborate programs of plant introduction to explore the potential of plants not only as food for their colonies but as botanical novelties of all kinds. In Paris, the project planning was placed in the hands of the Head Gardener of the Jardin du Roi, André Thouin, who recommended an inventory of plants, both native and exotic, in each colony, and the development of a reciprocal plant exchange system – all under the control of the garden in Paris. Part of this program was the sending of outstanding horticulturists and botanists (élève-botanists and élève-jardiniers) on voyages of scientific exploration.

== Collecting in Mauritius ==
In 1788 Martin was selected by Thouin as the first outstanding gardener to collect plant specimens for the Jardin du Roi in Madagascar and the Caribbean. The mission (1788–1789) was to the Isle de France (Mauritius), taking European plants for cultivation, with instructions to collect useful indigenous and cultivated plants from the Mascarenes and take them to French colonies in the West Indies for introduction as new crops. He was to send spice and other plants to acclimatize in Paris, Cayenne (French Guiana) and Antilles gardens and was given extensive instructions by Thouin ('Memoire sur le transport des vegetaux par mer et par terre’) on how to collect and transport his botanical collections. This first mission was to the Isle de France, Joseph Martin sailing from Le Havre on 5 May 1788 in the Stanislas arriving on 26 July. At the Jardin du Roi, Pamplemousses he was hosted and trained by Director Jean-Nicolas Céré from July 1788 to March 1789. He returned to France on 31 July 1789 having successfully introduced plants to Cayenne (French Guiana), Martinique and Santo Domingo (Dominican Republic) and brought herbarium material collected in Africa, South America and the West Indies for J.B. de Lamarck. He also found time to botanise on Madagascar and the Cape. Martin completed his brief by transporting spice plants to Port-au-Prince, and also returning plants to Thouin at the Jardin du Roi.

== Directorship in French Guiana ==
In 1790, he was appointed Director of the cultivation of spice plants in the acclimatisation garden at Cayenne in present-day French Guiana. He was then sent out again to South America, to oversee the cultivation of spice crops. Then, when he returned to France during the Napoleonic Wars in May 1803, his ship, a French ship of war, L'Union, was captured by two British privateers. Martin was imprisoned, the ship and contents subsequently being sold for prize money. Although he was later repatriated to France, a collection of his herbarium plants was auctioned in England. Material purchased by A.B. Lambert was subsequently acquired by the British Museum in 1842 during the auction of Lambert's own herbarium. Further material of Martin's was acquired by the British Museum along with the herbarium of E. Rudge in 1847.

Martin collected herbarium specimens in France, Southern Africa, the Madagascan region, Mauritius, Martinique, and French Guiana. They are housed in Paris, Geneva, Vienna and British Museum.

In 1888, botanist Henri Ernest Baillon published a genus of flowering plants from Mexico and Tropical America, belonging to the family Bignoniaceae as Martinella in his honour.

== See also ==
- List of gardener-botanist explorers of the Enlightenment
- European and American voyages of scientific exploration

== Bibliography ==
- Gunn, Mary; Codd, Leslie E (1981). Botanical Exploration of Southern Africa. Cape Town: A.A. Balkema. ISBN 0-86961-129-1.
- Ly-Tio-Fane, Madeleine (1991). "A reconnaissance of tropical resources during Revolutionary years: the role of the Paris Museum d'Histoire Naturelle". Archives of Natural History. 18 (3): 333–362. doi:10.3366/anh.1991.18.3.333.
- Ly-Tio-Fane, Madeleine (1996). "Botanic gardens: connecting links in plant transfer between the Indo-Pacific and Caribbean regions". Harvard Papers in Botany. 8: 7–14.
- Laségue (1845). Musée Botanique de M. Benjamin Delessert. Paris.
- Stearn, William T. (1957). "Martin's French Guiana Plants and Rudge's "Plantarum Guianae rariorum Icones"". Bull Jard. Bot. Brux. 27 (2): 243–265. doi:10.2307/3666961. JSTOR 3666961.
- Williams (1972). Contr. Bolus Herb. 3: 11.
