= Georg Scholl =

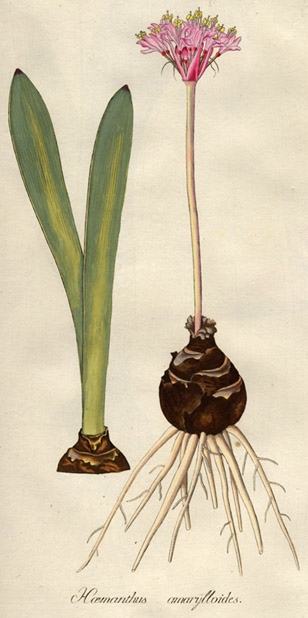
Haemanthus amarylloides Jacq. One of the plants collected at the Cape of South Africa by Boos and Scholl

Georg Scholl (24 October 1751 – 17 May 1831) was a gardener at Schönbrunn Palace in Vienna.

Scholl was born in Weilbach, Bavaria, Holy Roman Empire.

== Career ==
He was sent by Emperor Joseph II as assistant to gardener-botanist Franz Boos to collect specimens for the royal garden and cabinet on a collecting trip to the Cape of South Africa. Arriving at the end of May 1786, he completed a few short collecting trips with Scotsman Francis Masson and commissar Robert Jacob Gordon, these becoming longer over the next few months, the itineraries being unknown. Scholl was left at the Cape when Boos left for the Mascarene Islands on 18 February 1787. He returned a year later with so much material that it could not be transported in a single consignment. Boos sailed for Europe on 5 February 1788. Scholl remained at the Cape for another 14 years before returning to Europe. Much of this time Masson was also at the Cape and in correspondence to Joseph Banks pointed out the difficulties of getting transport for their collections. From the collections it seems that Boos and Scholl, or Scholl alone, collected as far north as Namaqualand and east to Kaffraria. From a horticulture standpoint, the collections greatly enriched the gardens at Schönbrunn Palace and much of their new material was described and beautifully illustrated in the work of botanist Jacquin.

Scholl died in Vienna.

== See also ==
- List of gardener-botanist explorers of the Enlightenment
- European and American voyages of scientific exploration
