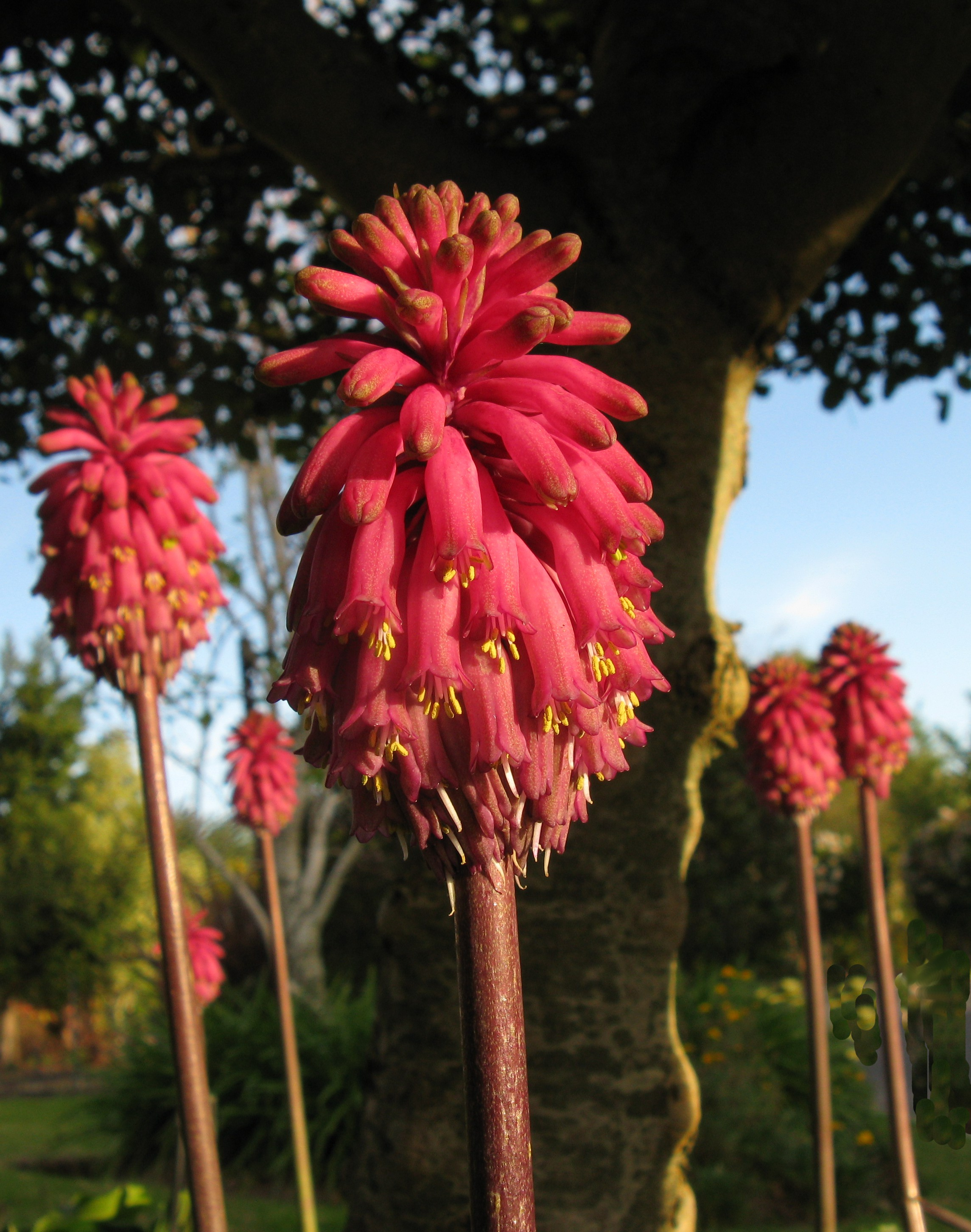

Scientific classification
- Kingdom: Plantae
- Clade: Tracheophytes
- Clade: Angiosperms
- Clade: Monocots
- Order: Asparagales
- Family: Asparagaceae
- Subfamily: Scilloideae
- Genus: Veltheimia
- Species: V. bracteata

Binomial name
- Veltheimia bracteata Harv. ex Baker

= Veltheimia bracteata =

Species of plant

Veltheimia bracteata is a species of plant. It belongs to the genus Veltheimia, which contains only one other species, Velthemia capensis. Veltheimia bracteata is commonly referred to as the forest lily, sand onion, or red hot poker (though the term "red hot poker" is also applied to species in the genus Kniphofia). This pendant-shaped plant ranges in color from a yellowish pink to red. It is a winter flowering perennial plant, so is in full bloom when other flowers have withered away. Plants grow to be 12–18 inches (30–46 cm) in height.

== Description ==
Veltheimia bracteata is a bulbous plant with glossy leaves. The erect flower stems arise from a rosette of basal leaves and blossom in an oval shaped inflorescence arrangement which is typically surrounded by dense spikes. The individual red or orange flowers are tubular and pendent. Plants are pollinated by birds. A fleshy seed is then produced at the end of August.

== Distribution ==
Veltheimia bracteata is native to the south-eastern Cape Provinces of South Africa.

== Cultivation ==
Veltheimia bracteata prefers a sheltered position in full sun, with well-drained soil. It tolerates low temperatures, but not freezing. Therefore in temperate zones it needs the protection of glass during the winter months.

In cultivation in the UK It has gained the Royal Horticultural Society's Award of Garden Merit.

V. bracteata and V. capensis can interbreed and produce hybrids.

== See also ==
- List of plants known as lily
