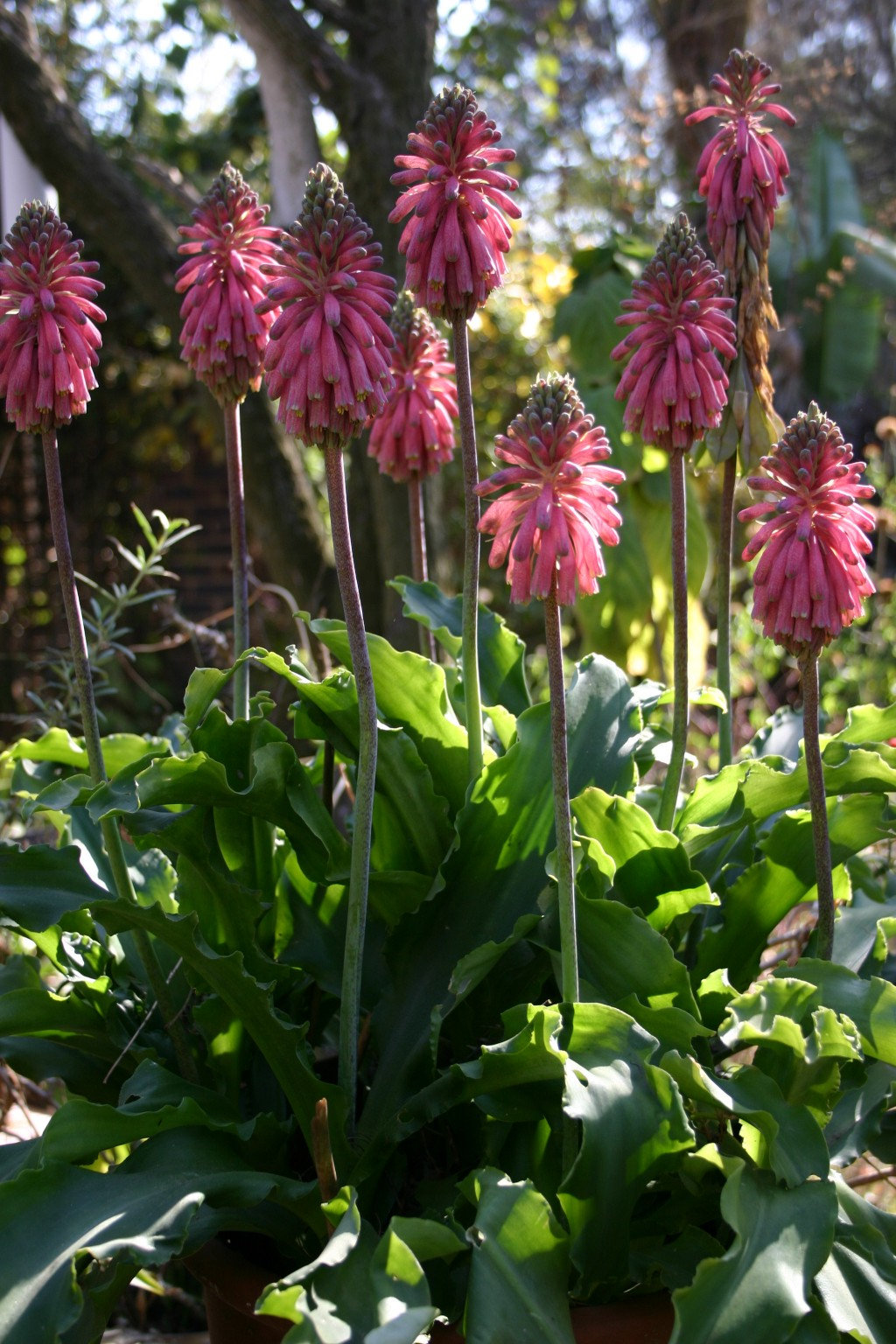
- Veltheimia bracteata

Scientific classification
- Kingdom: Plantae
- Clade: Tracheophytes
- Clade: Angiosperms
- Clade: Monocots
- Order: Asparagales
- Family: Asparagaceae
- Subfamily: Scilloideae
- Genus: Veltheimia; Gled.

= Veltheimia =

Genus of flowering plants

Veltheimia is a genus of perennial plants native to the Cape Provinces of South Africa in the family Asparagaceae, subfamily Scilloideae. It was named in honour of August Ferdinand von Veltheim (1741–1801), a German patron of botany.

There are two accepted species:

- Veltheimia bracteata Harv. ex Baker
- Veltheimia capensis (L.) DC.
