= Pierre Poivre =

French horticulturalist (1719–1786)

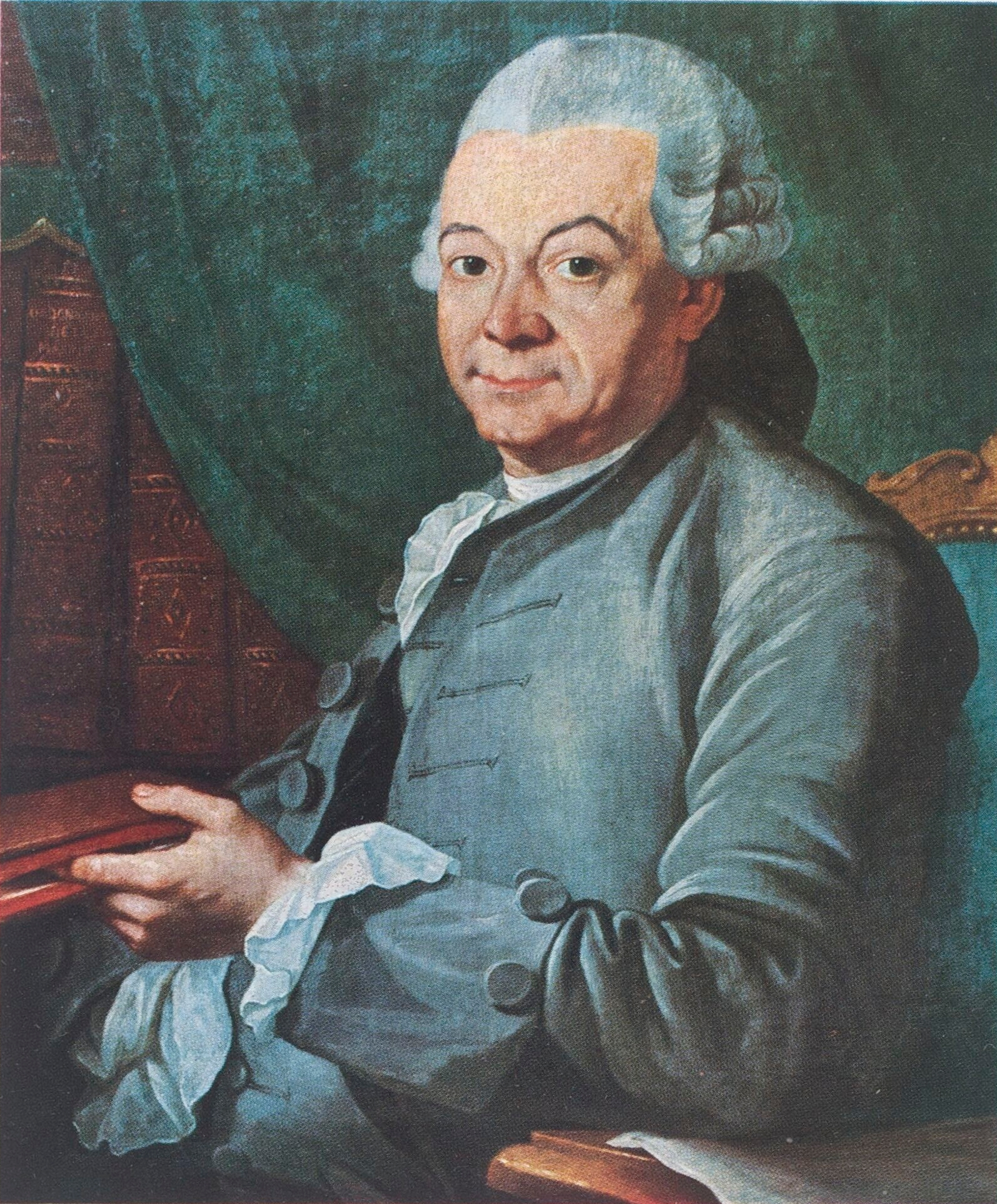
Portrait by Grognard, 1783

Pierre Poivre (23 August 1719 – 6 January 1786) was a French missionary turned "physiocrat" (horticulturist and economic botanist) and naturalist who worked in the French colony of Mauritius. He was involved in introducing the cultivation of numerous spices from Southeast Asia into Mauritius to make it a valuable colonial asset. He was appointed governor (Intendant) of the Ile de France (Mauritius) and Bourbon (Reunion) between 1766 and 1772. He established a botanical garden, Jardins des Pamplemousses, along with Philibert Commerson (1727-1773), at Mauritius. The English tongue-twister nursery rhyme "peter piper" (or "peter pepper") is thought to have been derived from his name, poivre being "pepper" in French.

== Biography ==
=== Early life and Southeast Asia ===
Poivre was born in Lyon, in the family of wealthy silk merchant. He worked at his father's shop and a thirst to travel the world made him join a Jansenist mission to study theology at the age of sixteen. He joined the Society of Foreign Missions four years later and was sent to East Asia in 1740. He first visited Macau where the Chinese Manchus looked at missionaries with suspicion. He then went to Canton. On January 25, 1745 the ship Dauphin on which he was travelling in the Straits of Banca was attacked by the English aboard the Deptford and the Preston under Admiral Barnett. He was injured in the battle by a cannonball and his right arm had to be partly amputated. The ships were sold by the English to the Dutch at Batavia (Jakarta). Poivre was imprisoned on an island but released on parole. He than visited Pondicherry where he met Bertrand François Mahé de Labourdonnais (1699-1753) and the two sailed to Ile de France (Mauritius) in December 1746. While at Java he became interested in agriculture and examined the cultivation of rice, coffee and sugarcane. At Pondicherry he examined spinning, weaving and dyeing. He reached France in June 1748, gave up as a missionary, and talked about trade opportunities with Cochinchina to the French East India Company with support of a letter from the governor of Mauritius, Pierre Félix Barthélemy David, to his father was a director in the Company.

=== Second trip to Southeast Asia ===
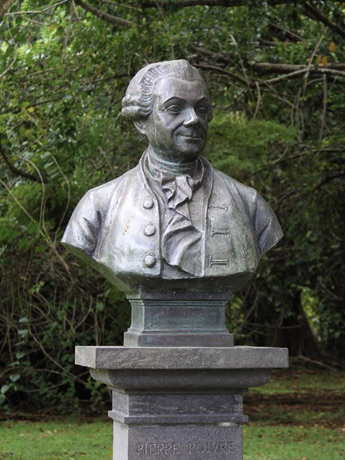
Bust in the Sir Seewoosagur Ramgoolam Botanical Garden in Mauritius.

Poivre's proposal was accepted and he was appointed as an ambassador to Cochinchina. He set out with a stop at Port Louis and reached Pondicherry in 1749 and then went on to Haiphong in August 1749. Here he obtained rights from the King Vo Vuong to set up a trading post. In 1750 he raided various Dutch territories including Cebu, Mindanao and Borneo, collecting various plants. With difficulty he returned to Pondicherry aboard the Cheval Marin in April 1753. Twelve out of nineteen of his nutmeg plants survived and he finally reached Mauritius in December with five surviving plants. On his earlier voyage he had collected some plants from the Cape of Good Hope and deposited them in Mauritius but these had died from neglect. He therefore took extra care for his nutmegs through various people on Mauritius. In May 1754 he sailed again, aboard the Colombe to Manila, hoping to find clove plants. He reached Timor and returned in May 1755 back to Mauritius in June. He brought cacao and breadfruit which he distributed in Mauritius. Some of the plants from his earlier collections had died mysteriously and there were various suspicions that they had been intentionally destroyed. He tried to contact the Company but did not hear from them and then decided to set sail to France in April 1756 with a stop on Madagascar. He set off in September again but was captured by the English in December and taken to Ireland. He was let off and he reached France in April 1757. He still did not get to discuss further plans from the Company but the controller general Henri Bertin ensured that he was paid 20,000 Francs in honorarium and Poivre retired to his home in Lyons. Here he began to write about his observations, which led to his admission in the Academy of Lyons in 1759. He published his Voyages d'un Philosophe [Voyages of a philosopher] in 1769 which was also republished as Oeuvres Complettes. He gave numerous talks on trade and economic botany which led to his being elected a correspondent of the Academy of Paris in 1754. In 1764 he also entertained two Chinese priests (Louis Ko (1732–1780) and Étienne Yang (1733–1787)) who were being trained at a Jesuit mission in Paris and he tried to obtain information on plants of economic importance and they were charged with obtaining scientific information of scientific value. With the end of the Seven Years’ War in 1764, the French East India Company was liquidated and the Jesuit order was suppressed. Poivre was offered the post of Intendant to the Islands of Mauritius and Bourbon in 1766 by the minister, the Duc de Praslin.

Poivre collected natural history specimens, particularly bird skins, and he visited Reaumur in 1751 to discuss the Chinese species that he had collected. He also sold many specimens to Reaumur. Poivre also sold some of his collections to Abbe Octave Aubry, Madame de Bandeville also known as Marie Anne Catherine Bigot de Graveron (1709–1787), and Chevalier Turgot. Brisson examined many of the specimens for his Ornithologie and nearly 73 species were described on the basis of material from Poivre. He also collected plant specimens and a species Genipa poivrei (now Hyperacanthus poivrei) from Madagascar is named after him as also the genus Poivrea (which is no longer used) which was erected by Commerson.

=== Governor of Mauritius and Bourbon ===
Poivre married seventeen-year-old Francoise Robin of Lyons in 1766 and the couple sailed to Mauritius in 1767 with letters from nobility and bearing the Order of St. Michel. They had three daughters in Mauritius. The novelist Bernardin de St. Pierre of Lyons was also an admirer of Francoise Poivre, wrote romantic letters to her, and used her as a model for his heroine in Paul et Virginie (1788). Poivre worked at Mauritius to establish a concrete plan to develop the spice industry. He was able to bring various plants and make the islands of Mauritius and Reunion self-sufficient in foodgrains and other provisions. Poivre also introduced legislations that limited the working hours of slaves (he also introduced measures for the capture of runaway slaves, banning black people from following their traditional medical treatments, inter-racial marriages etc. and the number of slaves increased from 15,000 in 1767 to 49,000 in 1797), improved the harbour of Port Louis and employed the botanist Philibert Commerson to set up a well-managed botanical garden which came to be called the Jardins des Pamplemousses. On the island of Mahé he had Antoine Gillot establish a spice garden which was called the Jardin du Roi. He legislated protection of forest trees to manage erosion and sedimentation of the harbour. Poivre was also aware of ideas on deforestation and its link to desiccation. He wanted to use the method from Pondicherry of planting hedges of bamboo and acacia. Poivre resigned from his position in 1772 and returned to France with his family.

=== Retirement, death and after ===
In 1775 a royal pension was decided and he died at his home in Lyons in 1772. Nine years after the death of Poivre, Francoise married Pierre Samuel du Pont de Nemours, who wrote a biography of Poivre, and was the father of the American industrialist who would establish the DuPont chemical company.

In 1780, Charles Routier de Romainville (1742 – 1792), a French Commandant in the Seychelles mistook an approaching French ship for an English one and ordered that the valuable spice gardens of the Jardin du Roi be scuttled and burnt to prevent it from being taken over. The botanical garden that he started in Mauritius is now known as the Sir Seewoosagur Ramgoolam Botanical Garden (Botanical Garden of Pamplemousses) which was developed further after Poivre by Jean-Nicolas Céré. The Poivre Islands coral atoll is named in his honor. It is located in the Amirante Islands group of coral islands and atolls that belong to the Outer Islands of the Seychelles.

== Writings ==
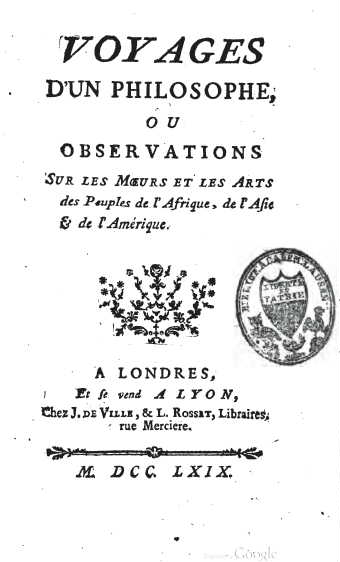
1769 title page of Voyages of a Philosopher

- Voyages of a Philosopher − Voyages d'un philosophe ou observations sur les moeurs et les arts des peuples de l'Afrique, de l'Asie et de l'Amérique — Fortuné-Barthélemy de Félice, 1769. The book was read with interest by Thomas Jefferson, his description of mountain rice cultivated in Vietnam caught Jefferson's attention.
- Tableau historique de l'Inde, contenant un abrégé de la mithologie et des mœurs indiennes — Aux dépens de la Société typographique, 1771.

== Family ==
Pierre Poivre married Françoise Robin (1749 - 1841) on 5 September 1766 in Pommiers, Rhône. They had three children:

- Marie Poivre (1768 - 1787)
- Françoise Julienne Ile-de-France Poivre (1770 - 1845), married Jean-Xavier Bureau de Pusy (1750 - 1806)
- Sarah Poivre (1773 - 1814)

He was an uncle to the renowned French naturalist Pierre Sonnerat (1748-1814).

Pierre's surname means "pepper" (Poivre;) in French, leading some authors to identify him as the subject of the Peter Piper rhyme.
