= Thomas Mayer (German economist) =

German economist (born 1954), former chief economist of Deutsche Bank

- Born: 3 January 1954 (age 72); Backnang, West Germany

Academic background
- Education: University of Kiel
- Influences: Juergen B. Donges

Academic work
- Discipline: International economics
- Institutions: Deutsche Bank

Thomas Mayer (born 3 January 1954) is a German economist who served as chief economist of Deutsche Bank from January 2010 until May 2012.

Mayer, who was born in Backnang, Baden-Württemberg, attended the University of Kiel, where he graduated with a doctorate in 1982. Between 1983 and 1990 he worked for the International Monetary Fund, preceding the financial sector. He worked for Salomon Brothers and Goldman Sachs, before joining Deutsche Bank's London office in 2002. In 2010, He replaced Norbert Walter's position as Deutsche Bank's chief economist.

== Selected publications ==
- Biggs, M.; Mayer, T.; Pick, A. (2010). "Credit and Economic Recovery: Demystifying Phoenix Miracles". SSRN 1595980.
- Mayer, T. (1982). "Export instability and economic development: The case of Colombia". Weltwirtschaftliches Archiv. 118 (4): 749–761. doi:10.1007/BF02706707. S2CID 153670594.
