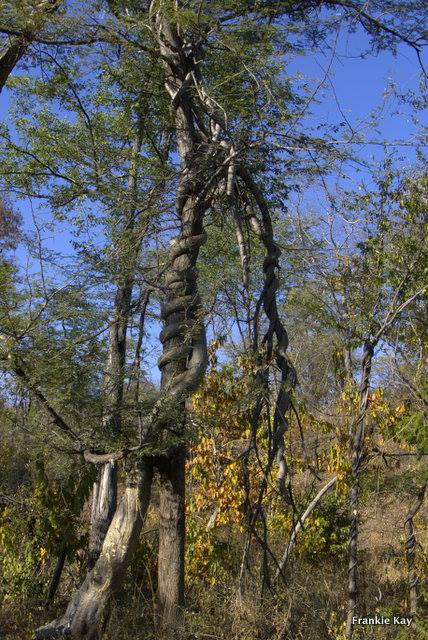

Scientific classification
- Kingdom: Plantae
- Clade: Tracheophytes
- Clade: Angiosperms
- Clade: Eudicots
- Clade: Asterids
- Order: Gentianales
- Family: Apocynaceae
- Genus: Fockea
- Species: F. multiflora

Binomial name
- Fockea multiflora K.Schum. 1893

Synonyms
- Fockea schinzii N.E.Brown 1895

= Fockea multiflora =

Species of succulent

Fockea multiflora, or python vine, is a plant of the dogbane family, Apocynaceae, native to Tanzania, Mozambique, Zimbabwe, Zambia, Angola, Botswana, Namibia, including the Caprivi Strip, and Malawi. It is a large semisucculent liana, growing to some 15m in length and up to 60 cm in diameter, found primarily in the seasonally dry tropical biome.

== Taxonomy ==
The genus Fockea comprises six species belonging to the Asclepiadoideae (milkweeds) subfamily of the Apocynaceae family. Massive specimens of F. multiflora are probably the largest known members of this subfamily.

All six Fockea species occur south of the equator in Africa, with F. multiflora the second most widely distributed, after F. angustifolia. Unlike the other five Fockea species, all of which are relatively small climbers with swollen, mostly subterranean tubers, F. multiflora is a massive, tropical liana without a tuber, It is considered a sister to the other five species.

== Description ==
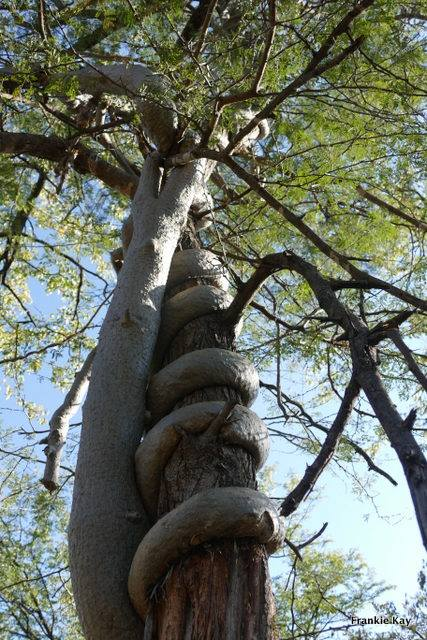
Fockea multiflora at Matetsi Safari Area in northwestern Zimbabwe close to the Victoria Falls

Fockea multiflora is a large climber up to 15 m, with a thick, fleshy trunk up to 30 cm thick, swollen toward the base but lacking a distinct basal tuber. In mature plants the rootstock consists of a network of fleshy roots radiating from the base of the stem. By comparison, in the other five Fockea species, stems arise from a tuber that is much broader than the main stem. F. multiflora is rarely shrub-like; rather, its stems sprawl on the ground or twist around surrounding trees as massive lianas, appearing to strangle them, although there’s no evidence that the supporting trees are harmed. The stems produces a white, milky latex. Young stems are tomentose (covered with densely matted wooly hairs), later becoming covered with grey, shiny bark.

Leaves are opposite, broadly elliptic to ovate, large (100mm x 80mm), with grey-felted undersides, felty to smooth above. These leaves, as well as the fruits and seeds, are much larger than for other Fockea species.

Inflorescence is a many-flowered axillary cluster of as many as 30 flowers approximately 15mm in diameter, grayish-green on the outside and yellow-green to brown on the inside, with flowers opening simultaneously or in rapid succession. The fruits are smooth, paired and horn-shaped, 10–22 cm × 1.5–3 cm, dehiscing to release multiple winged seeds; seeds are ovate and flattened, 10 mm × 7–8 mm, shortly winged.

== Ecology ==
Growing in the altitude range of 600–1000 m, Fockea multiflora occurs on low hills or among rocks around the base of hills in dry, open, often deciduous woodland or scrub, especially mixed Acacia-Commiphora-Balanites or mopane woodland. It does not tend to occur in more mesic miombo woodland dominated by Brachystegia.

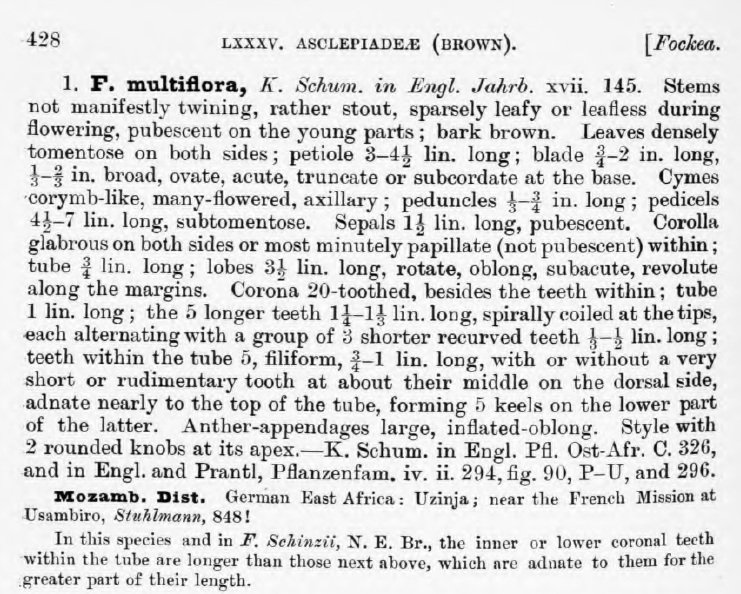
1904 description by N. E. Brown
