= August Ferdinand von Veltheim =

German mineralogist and geologist

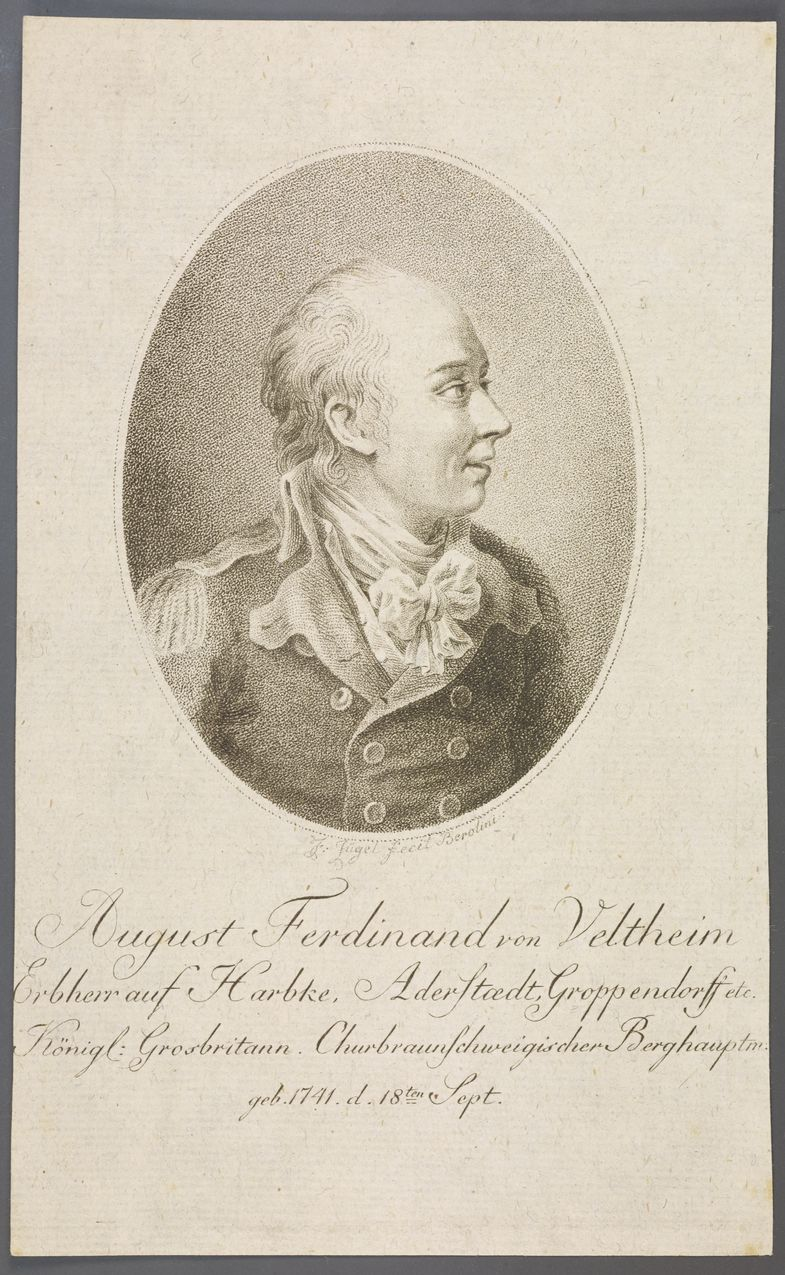

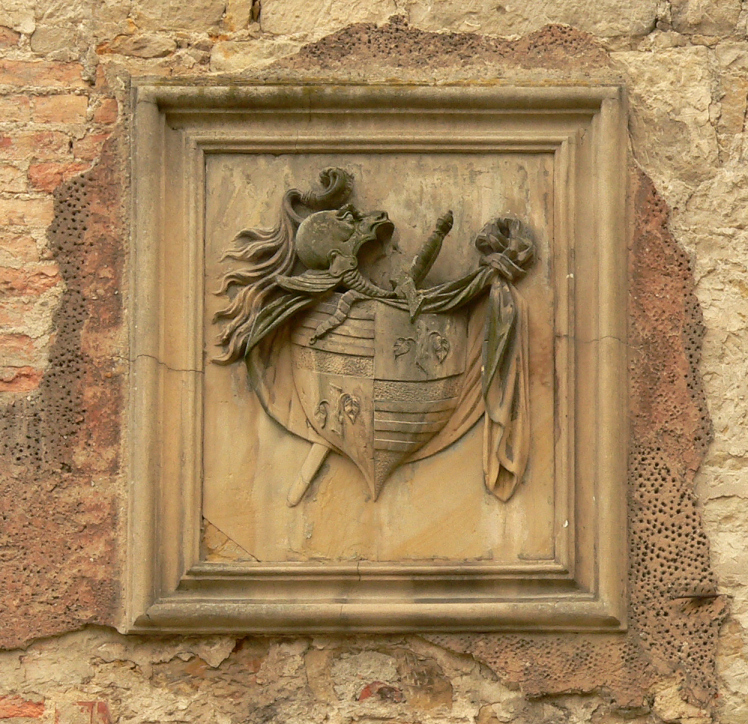
Family crest of von Veltheim on wall of Harbke Castle

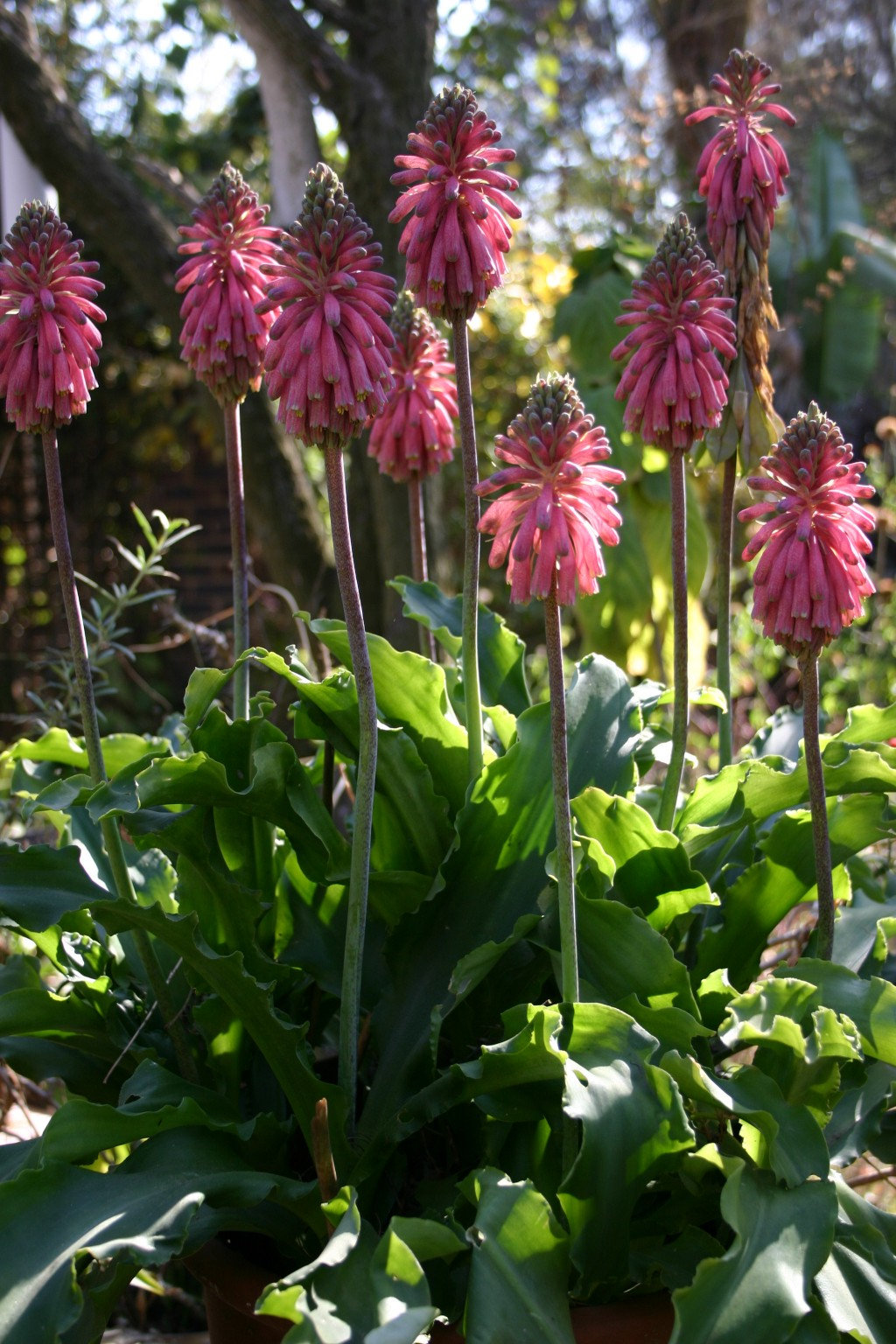
Veltheimia bracteata

August Ferdinand von Veltheim (18 September 1741 Harbke – 2 October 1801. Braunschweig) was a German mineralogist and geologist, and came from the aristocratic family of Veltheim. He was known as August Ferdinand Graf von Veltheim from 1798 after acquiring the title of 'Graf'.

He attended the Kloster Berge school (Pädagogium) near Magdeburg between 1756 and 1758. He was introduced to the world of mining by Friedrich Anton von Heynitz, a mining official and later Minister of Industry under Frederick the Great. In 1760 he enrolled for a course on mineralogy at the University of Helmstedt. In 1763 he became financial advisor to the Duke of Braunschweig, and in this capacity made numerous trips to mines and saltworks of the region in the company of his father Friedrich August von Veltheim (1709-1775). In 1766 he was promoted to Inspector of Mines in the mineral-rich mining district of the Harz Mountains. After the death of his first son and first wife in 1779, Veltheim resigned his post and for some years withdrew from public life.

He was appointed privy councillor to the Duke of Braunschweig, and in 1790 was named general inspector of mines and saltworks in the western extremities of Russia by Catherine the Great. Veltheim still preferred the tranquil life of Harbke, a place to which he soon returned, where, in the grounds of Harbke Castle, he carried on developing the widely acclaimed public gardens started by his father. His home became a gathering place for celebrities in the social, scientific and literary worlds. The Castle boasted a large library, cabinets displaying minerals and fossils, and collections of engravings.

Veltheim planned to write a treatise on the formation of the Earth, but only managed to complete the first part, 'Etwas über die Bildung des Basalts' and which was published in Leipzig in 1787; a second edition appeared in 1789. Historically this was an important work since it correctly attributed granite to arising from volcanic processes. Veltheim broke with the Wernerian doctrine, then popular in German geological science. Veltheim published very few works, and even those had a small circulation. He was awarded an honorary doctorate in science from the University of Helmstedt in 1793.

The plant genus Veltheimia was named in his honour by the botanist Johann Gottlieb Gleditsch (1714-1786).

== Genealogy ==
August Ferdinand's parents were Friedrich August von Veltheim (21 October 1709 Harbke – 19 April 1775 Braunschweig) and Maria Anna Katharina Kameytsky von Elstibors (1709–1760), who had married on 19 November 1732 in Wolfenbüttel. They had produced 4 children

- Sophie Charlotte von Veltheim (1735–1793),
- August Ferdinand von Veltheim, Graf von Veltheim (1741–1801),
- Friedrich Wilhelm von Veltheim (1743–1803),
- Carl Christian Septimus von Veltheim auf Ostrau (1751–1796)

August Ferdinand von Veltheim's 1st marriage was on 4 June 1771 at Harbke to Philippine Friederike von dem Bussche-Lohe (died 28 April 1778 at Zellerfeld). Their marriage produced 2 children

- Friedrich Adolf Graf von Veltheim (who died young)
- Adelheid von Veltheim (2 January 1774 – 12 January 1821)

A year after his wife's death August Ferdinand was married for a 2nd time on 21 May 1779 at Gröba to Ottonia Henriette von Arnim (25 January 1760 – 16 March 1803). This union produced 5 children

- Röttger Graf von Veltheim (25 January 1781 – 27 March 1848)
- Werner Graf von Veltheim (18 February 1785 – 5 June 1860)
- Klara Gräfin von Veltheim (13 June 1790–?)
- Marianne Albertine Gräfin von Veltheim (26 February 1794 – 10 May 1844) x Franz Wilhelm Werner von Veltheim (10 November 1785 – 31 December 1839)
- Armgard von Veltheim (?–?)

== Works ==
- Grundriss einer Mineralogie (Braunschweig, 1781)
- Etwas ueber die Bildung des Basalts und die vormalige Beschaffenheit der Gebirge in Deutschland (Leipzig, 1787)
- Ueber der Herren Werner und Karsten - Reformen in der Mineralogie; nebst Anmerkungen über die ältere und neuere Benennung einiger Stein-Arten (Helmstedt, 1793)
- Etwas über Memnons Bildsaule, Neros Smaragd, Toreutik und die Kunst der Alten in Stein und Glas zu schneiden, als Zustse zur Abhandlung über die Reformen in der Mineralogie (Helmstedt, 1793)
- Etwas ueber die Onyxgebirge des Ctesias, und den Handel der Admsten nach Ostindien (Helmstedt, 1797)
- Sammlung einiger Aufsätze historischen, antiquarischen, mineralogischen und ähnlichen Inhalts (Helmstedt, 1800)
