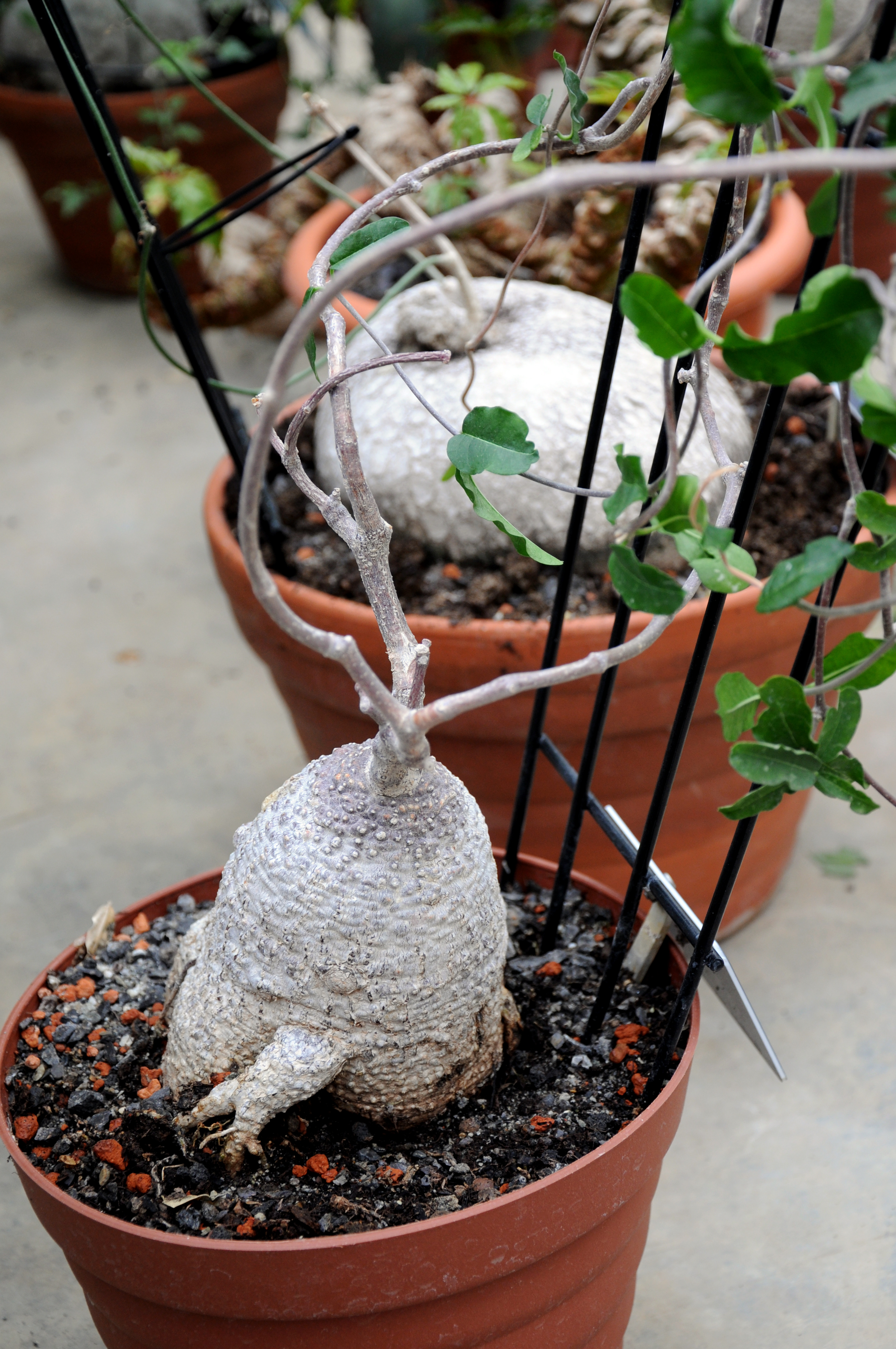

Scientific classification
- Kingdom: Plantae
- Clade: Tracheophytes
- Clade: Angiosperms
- Clade: Eudicots
- Clade: Asterids
- Order: Gentianales
- Family: Apocynaceae
- Genus: Fockea
- Species: F. edulis

Binomial name
- Fockea edulis (Thunb.) K. Schum. (1895)

Synonyms
- Brachystelma macrorrhizum E.Mey. (1838); Chymocormus edulis (Thunb.) Harv. ex C.Presl (1845); Echites edulis (Thunb.) Thunb. (1819); Fockea cylindrica R.A.Dyer (1933); Fockea glabra Decne. (1844); Pergularia edulis Thunb. (1794)

= Fockea edulis =

Species of plant

Fockea edulis is a species of caudiciform plant in the family Apocynaceae that is native to the Cape Provinces and KwaZulu-Natal in South Africa.

== Taxonomy ==
The plant was first described as Pergularia edulis by Carl Peter Thunberg in 1794. It was renamed Fockea edulis in 1895 by Karl Moritz Schumann.

A common name is Hottentot bread due to the milky, somewhat sweetish flavour of the edible root which is sometimes gathered from the wild for local use. The plant's latex is said to be poisonous. In Afrikaans the plant is called bergbaroe, bergkambroo, kambaroo, kambroo, kambro, koe or hotnotswaatlemoen. In Khoi it is called !Koo, !Ku, or !Kuu.

== Description ==
A semi-deciduous perennial caudiciform with fat, twisted grey roots. In the wild, the caudex is partially or totally buried and tends to grow faster this way, reaching up to 60 cm in diameter. According to succulent authority Hermann Jacobsen, it occasionally attains to a diameter of ten feet (three meters) and is shaped like a immense turnip. The thin vine branches may reach a length of up to 4 meters, and climb on any type of available support. The leaves are green, entire and oblong.

Fockeas are dioecious, so a male plant and a female plant are needed to produce seeds. The flowers are whitish-green, not very showy but lightly scented, small (0.6-1.5 cm wide) vygie-like flowers surrounded by a large, thick, spider-like calyx. The flowers are pollinated by fruit flies. The plant produces grey-greenish seed pods.

== Distribution and habitat ==
This species is widespread in southern Africa where it grows in warmer drier areas, dry savanna, and rocky slopes. It is of easy cultivation and hardy when kept reasonably dry and watered only enough to keep the tuber from shriveling. Although it shows decreased activity in the January – April period, it never goes into complete dormancy and always carries some leaves. Plants cannot tolerate more than occasional light frosts with temperatures dropping as low as -2 °C.
