= Peter Piper =

Nursery rhyme

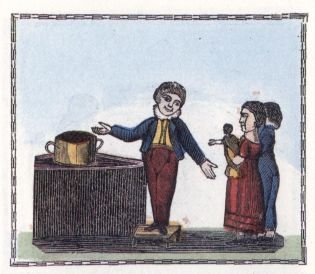
- Illustration from Peter Piper's Practical Principles of Plain and Perfect Pronunciation (1836 American ed.)

Nursery rhyme
- Published: 1813

"Peter Piper" is an English-language nursery rhyme and well-known alliteration tongue-twister. It has a Roud Folk Song Index number of 19745.

== Lyrics ==
The traditional version, as published in John Harris' Peter Piper's Practical Principles of Plain and Perfect Pronunciation in 1813, is:

Peter Piper picked a peck of pickled peppers,
A peck of pickled peppers Peter Piper picked;
If Peter Piper picked a peck of pickled peppers,
Where's the peck of pickled peppers Peter Piper picked?

A common modern version is:

Peter Piper picked a peck of pickled peppers.
If Peter Piper picked a peck of pickled peppers,
How many pickled peppers did Peter Piper pick
if he picked a peck of pickled peppers?

A "peck" is a unit of dry volume, with the imperial peck equivalent to a quarter of a bushel. The term is, however, now obsolete in British English.

== Origins ==
The earliest published version of this tongue-twister was in Peter Piper's Practical Principles of Plain and Perfect Pronunciation, by John Harris (1756–1846), issued in London in 1813. The book includes a one-name tongue-twister for each letter of the alphabet in the same style. However, the rhyme was apparently known at least a generation earlier. Some authors have identified the subject of the rhyme as Pierre Poivre, an eighteenth‑century French horticulturalist and government administrator of Mauritius, who once investigated the Seychelles' potential for spice cultivation.

== Peter Piper Principle ==
The Peter Piper Principle is a cognitive error that people make, where they tend to confuse two words that resemble each other; in particular, when the first letter(s) are the same. Studies have shown that this applies when people confuse the names of other people (although other tendencies also apply).

Novelists are well aware of the peril of giving two characters names that start with the same letter, because readers have a tendency to get them confused. Names of medications also tend to be confused when they start with the same few letters.
