= Jean-Nicolas Céré =

French botanist and agronomist

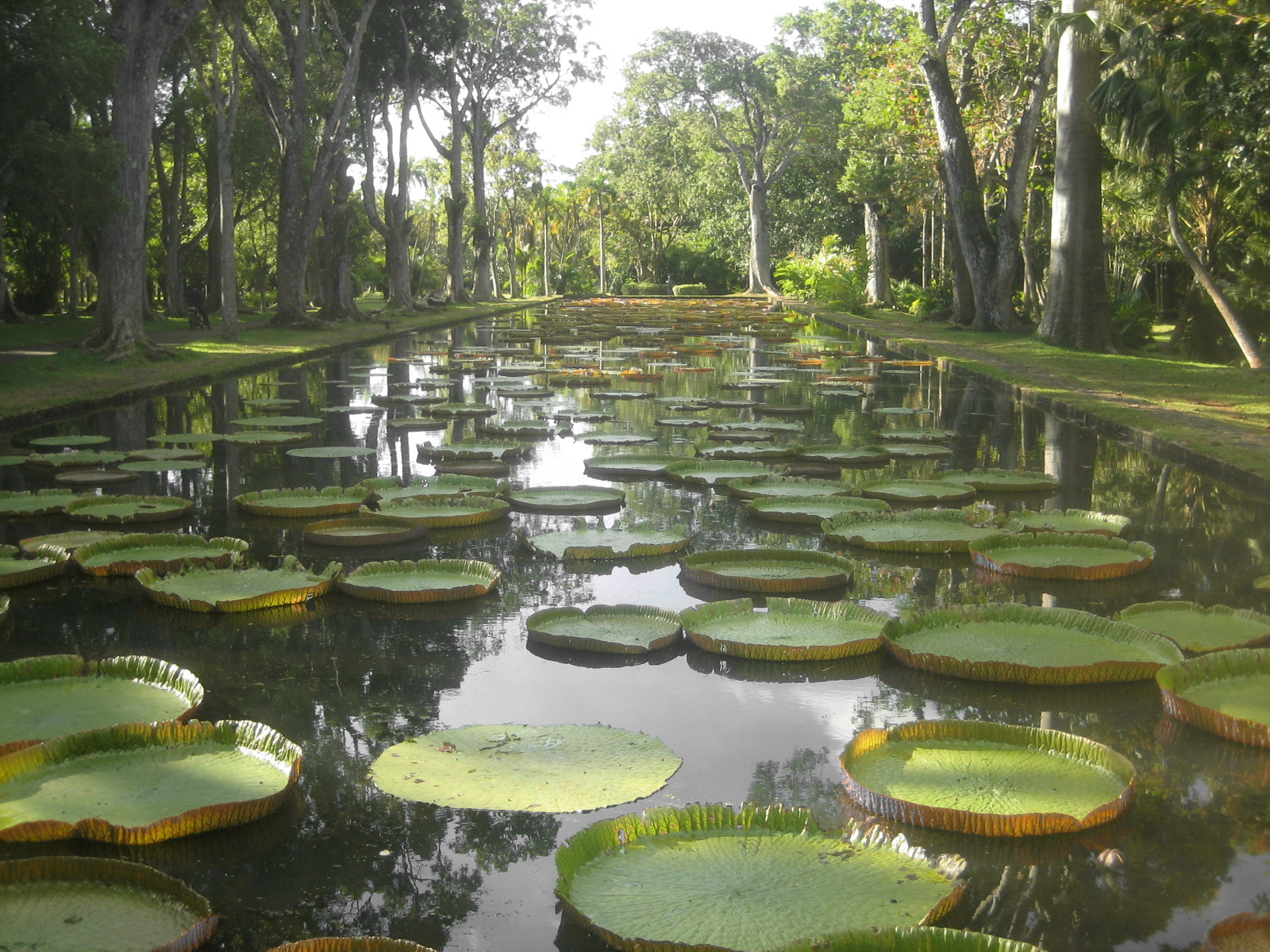
Giant waterlilies at the Sir Seewoosagur Ramgoolam Botanical Garden, formerly Jardin du Roi, Isle de France

Jean-Nicolas Céré (20 August 1737 – 2 May 1810) was a French botanist and agronomist born on the Indian Ocean Isle de France (now Mauritius) but educated in Brittany and Paris. On the Isle de France, he was befriended by Pierre Poivre (1719–1786), administrator of the Isle de France and Ile Bourbon (Réunion), who he assisted in the cultivation of spices. When Poivre was recalled to France in 1773, Céré was appointed Director of the Royal Garden at Monplaisir (now Sir Seewoosagur Ramgoolam Botanical Garden), a position he held from 1775 to the time of his death in 1810.

During his time on the island, Céré encouraged plant exchange, making considerable contribution to economic botany by sending living plants to many countries, raising numerous peppers, cloves, cinnamon and nutmeg trees which he distributed to the neighbouring French islands, and also introducing to Mauritius useful plants from Malaysia, America, China and elsewhere.

== Biography ==
Details of Céré's life, on which the following account is based, have been researched by J. Deleuze.

Jean-Nicolas Céré was the son of François-Toussaint Céré, a naval officer who, according to the memoirs of Bertrand-François Mahé de La Bourdonnais, was at the age of five posted to France to study, his father having died in Martinique. He arrived at Brest as a ward of the state. For several years he was a student at the College of Valves, finishing his studies in Paris. In 1757, he served in two campaigns under the command of Count Anne Antoine d'Aché being promoted to officer. In 1759 he settled on the Isle de France, his father having left him a considerable fortune.

On the Isle de France Céré married Bernardine Marie de La Roche du Ronzet on 27 January 1763. His son Jean-Auguste Céré (17 May 1764 to 18 November 1831) succeeded him as Director of the garden. On his death Céré left two sons and five daughters, the eldest son living at home with three of his sisters. The second son was in the service of France. His other two daughters were married, Constance-Joséphine Céré (19 July 1769 to 23 June 1842) to General Louis Marie François César Ange d'Houdetot, their grandson being the historian César Lecat de Bazancourt, the other to Mr. Barbé, former Royal Judge in the Isle-of-France: both were living in Paris.

== Association with Pierre Poivre ==
Assuming a date of establishment of 1735 the Jardin du Roi at Pamplemousses was the world's first tropical botanic garden and, situated on the trade route between Europe and Asia, it had accumulated many of the new botanical treasures of the day. The gardens had evolved on the 'Mon Plaisir' estate of Pierre Poivre. It had been sold to the French crown at the end of his directorship with a recommendation that Céré be appointed the next director. During his directorship it was renamed Jardin Royal. Céré became assistant to Pierre Poivre who had in 1766 been appointed Administrator of the islands of France and Bourbon administering trade the country. When Poivre left the island in 1772 Céré was named Director of the Pamplemousses Botanical Garden in 1775. Plantations of peppers, cloves, cinnamons, and nutmeg were established on the Isle de France and Bourbon, the plants then being sent to the West Indies and Cayenne.

In the garden Céré acclimatised plants and trees from America, India and China as well as European fruits and vegetables. He maintained correspondence with other horticulturists and naturalists including Georges-Louis Leclerc de Buffon, Edme-Louis Daubenton, André Thouin, Jacques Labillardière and others, sending briefs to the Royal Agricultural Society of the Généralité de Paris, which awarded him in 1788 with a gold medal. Napoleon confirmed his title as director of the botanical garden. He also introduced an Indian species of fish, the gourami, and made observations to assist the prediction of tropical cyclones on the island. Céré was asked by the Habsburg Emperor Joseph II to assist in expanding the famous Gardens of Schönbrunn and hosted Franz Boos, botanist of Schönbrunn, in 1787–1788. Then he hosted Joseph Martin, from the Jardin du Roy of Paris.

Céré was director of the gardens at the time of a visit to the island in 1795 after the demise of the Bruni d'Entrecasteaux expedition to New Holland in search of La Pérouse. Botanist Labillardière noted that the coco de mer palm (Lodoicea maldivica) from the island of Praslin in the Seychelles (botanically notable for its 'double' coconut, the largest seed in the world) was cultivated at the Pamplemousses gardens where it had been planted in 1769. This remarkable palm had been discovered in 1768–69 on an expedition to the Seychelles organised by Marc-Joseph Marion Dufresne. One reason for the visit would have been to prepare the way for the arrival of Breadfruit plants collected by himself and gardener Félix Delahaye in Tonga and which at that time were being tended by gardener botanist Delahaye in Java in preparation for the journey to Isle de France.

== Honours ==
Céré was awarded the medal of the Société d’Agriculture on 28 November 1788.

== See also ==
- List of gardener-botanist explorers of the Enlightenment
- European and American voyages of scientific exploration

== Bibliography ==
- Deleuze, J.P.F. (1810). "Notice sur M. De Céré". Annales Museum d'Histoire Naturelle Paris. 16: 329–337.
- Duyker, Edward (2003). Citizen Labillardière. A Naturalist's Life in Revolution and Exploration (1755–1834). Melbourne: Miegunyah Press. ISBN 0-522-85010-3.
- Labillardière, Jean-Jacques H. (1807). "Sur le cocotier des Maldives (Lodicea sechellarum Labill.)". Annales du Museum National d'Histoire Naturelle. 9: 140–145.
- Ly-Tio-Fane, Madeleine (1991). "A reconnaissance of tropical resources during Revolutionary years: the role of the Paris Museum d'Histoire Naturelle". Archives of Natural History. 18 (3): 333–362. doi:10.3366/anh.1991.18.3.333.
