= Norbert Walter (economist) =

German economist

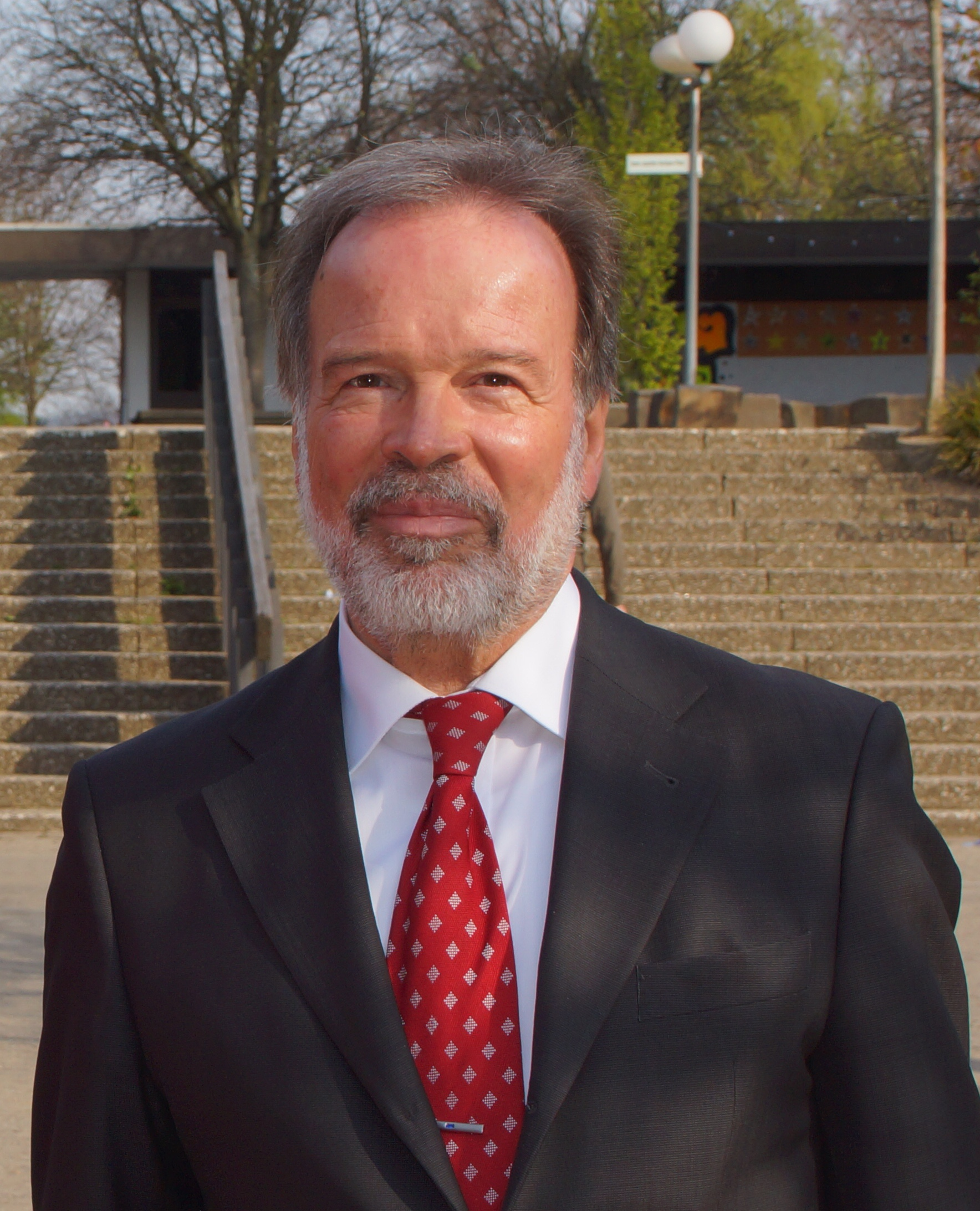
- Born: 23 September 1944; Weckbach, Bavaria
- Died: 31 August 2012 (aged 67); South Tyrol

Academic background
- Education: University of Frankfurt
- Influences: Herbert Giersch

Academic work
- Discipline: Macroeconomics, Monetary economics
- Institutions: Deutsche Bank

Norbert Walter (23 September 1944 – 31 August 2012) was a German economist. He was the chief economist of Deutsche Bank from 1990 to 2009.

Born in Weilbach, Bavaria, Walter studied economics at the Johann Wolfgang Goethe University Frankfurt am Main, earning his Diplom in 1968.

In 1990, he succeeded Franz-Josef Trouvain as chief economist of Deutsche Bank, and remained in that position until 2009, when he was succeeded by Thomas Mayer.
