= Sir Seewoosagur Ramgoolam Botanical Garden =

Garden in Pamplemousses, near Port Louis, Mauritius

Coordinates: 20°6′29.35″S 57°34′38.11″E

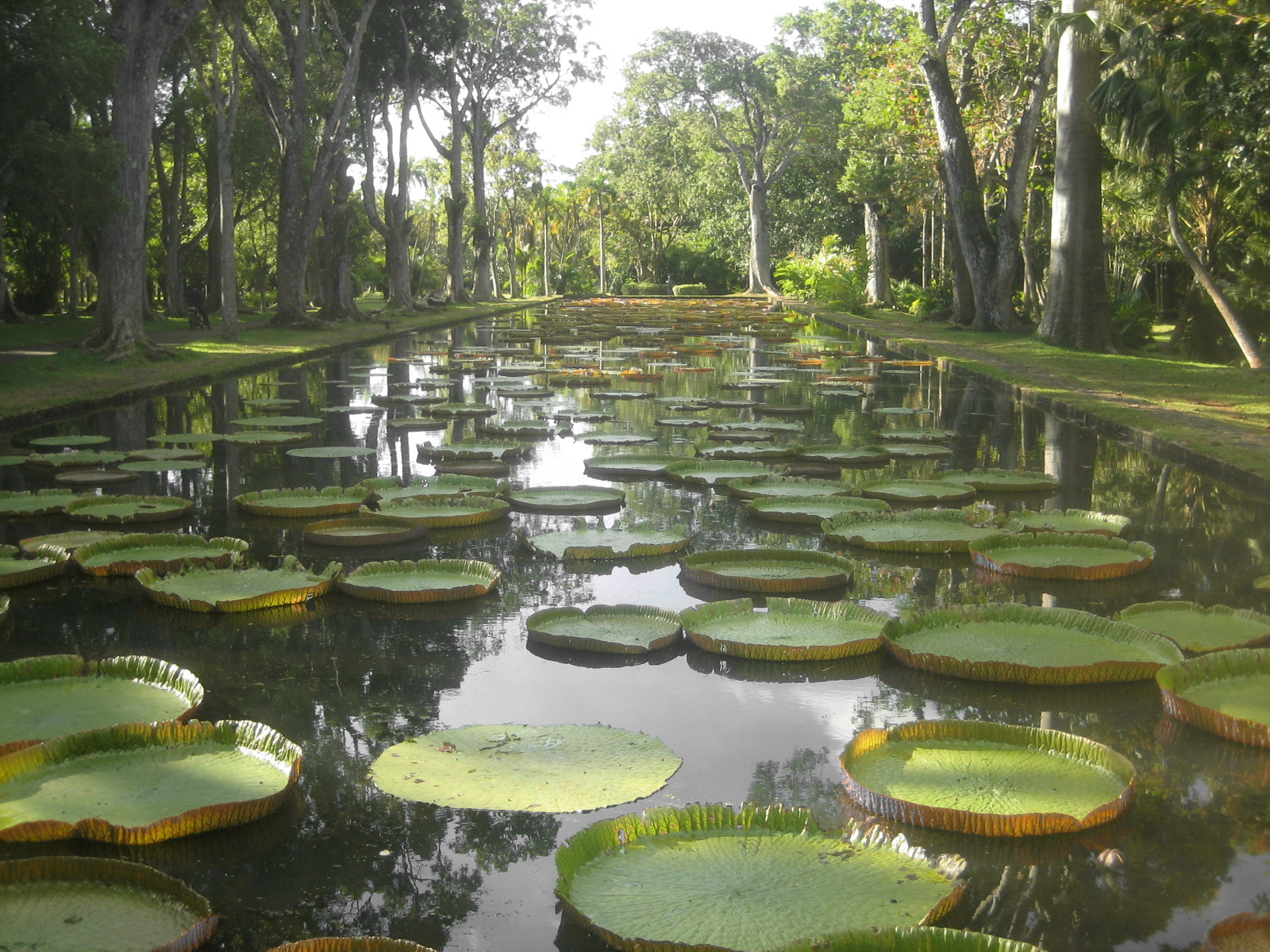
Giant water lilies at the SSR Botanical garden

The Sir Seewoosagur Ramgoolam Botanic Garden (sometimes shortened to the SSR Botanic Garden), commonly known as the Pamplemousses Botanic Garden, is a popular tourist attraction in Pamplemousses, near Port Louis, Mauritius, and the oldest botanical garden in the Southern Hemisphere. Famous for its long pond of giant water lilies (Victoria amazonica), the garden, first constructed by Pierre Poivre (1719 – 1786) in 1770, covers an area of around 37 hectares (91 acres).

The garden, for a long time was ranked third among all the gardens that could be admired over the surface of the globe', have been known successively as 'Jardin de Mon Plaisir', 'Jardin des Plantes', 'Le Jardin National de l’Ile de France', 'Jardin Royal', 'Jardin Botanique des Pamplemousses', and during the British colonisation, 'The Royal Botanical Gardens of Pamplemousses' and 'The Royal Botanic Gardens, Pamplemousses'. On 17 September 1988 the garden was formally named "Sir Seewoosagur Ramgoolam Botanic Garden", named after the first prime minister of Mauritius, as was the smaller SSR Botanical Garden of Curepipe.

In addition to its giant waterlilies, the garden also features spices, ebonies, sugar canes, and 85 varieties of palms from Central America, Asia, Africa and the islands around the Indian Ocean. Many trees have been planted by world leaders and royalty, including Princess Margaret, Countess of Snowdon, Indira Gandhi, François Mitterrand and Robert Mugabe.

These gardens are situated in the village of Pamplemousses which lies about seven miles northeast of the capital, Port Louis. Pamplemousse or pamplemoucier is the grapefruit tree (Citrus x paradisi), which grows in the region, possibly introduced by the Dutch from Java.

== Associated property Mon Plaisir ==
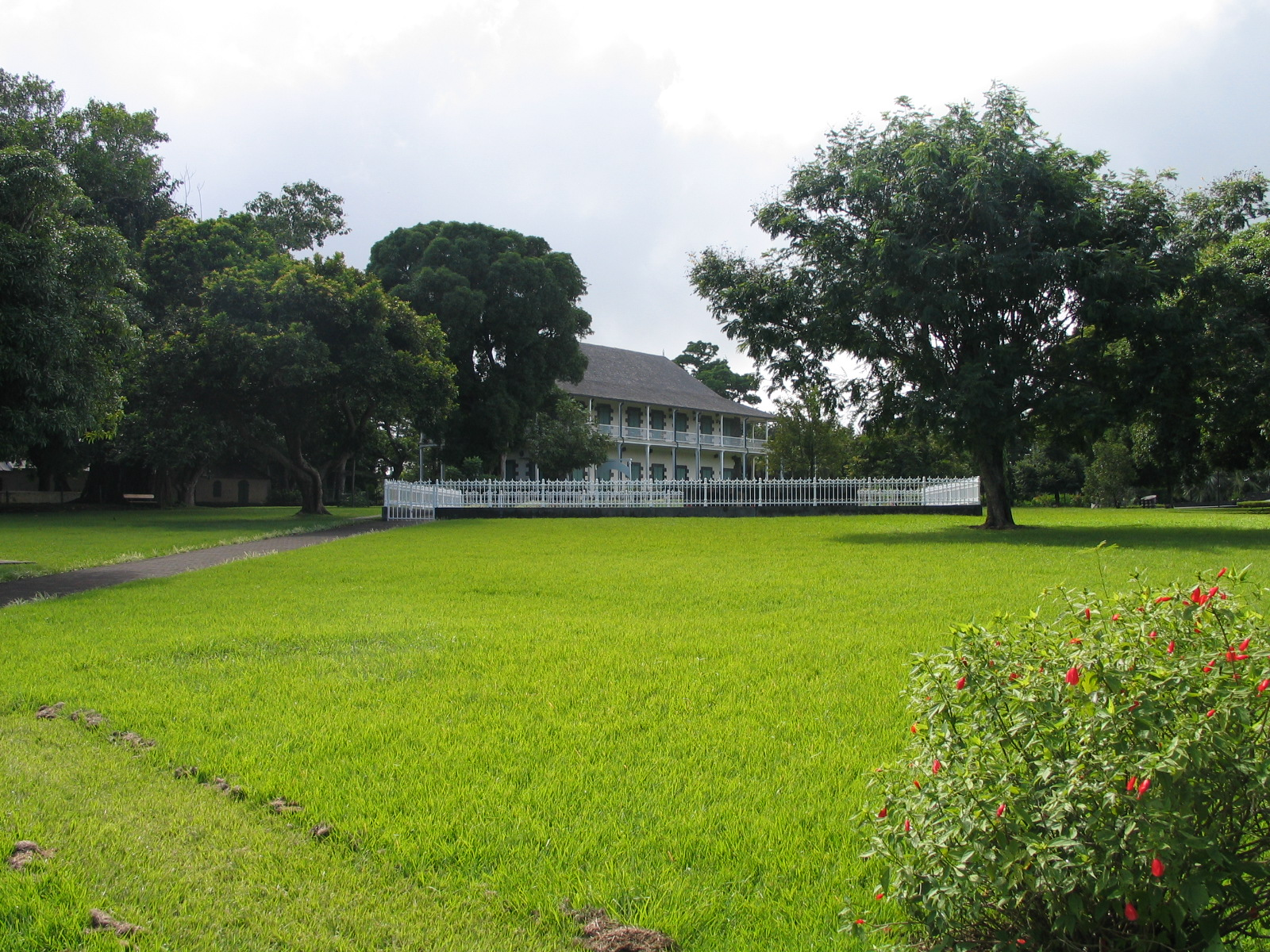
Château de Mon Plaisir

The gardens were set aside on 8 June 1729 for colonist P. Barmont or Barmond, who sold it on 3 January 1735 to Claude N. de Maupin, an overseer in the royal French East India Company. Subsequently, there were several other owners, and by 1805, the land had increased to about 49 ha (121 acres). By 1868, the gardens themselves occupied 19.2 ha (47.5 acres), with later additions to a total of 38 ha (93 acres). Only 25 ha (62 acres) of garden remain, the rest being an experimental station.

== Establishment ==
The origin of the Royal Botanic Gardens of Pamplemousses can be traced to the first and most famous French Governor of Mauritius, Mahé de La Bourdonnais at a time when the island was known as Isle de France. In 1735, Labourdonnais bought the property Château Mon Plaisir and created a vegetable garden to provide produce for his household, the young township of Port Louis, and the ships landing on the island. If this garden counts as precursor to the present garden, then Pamplemousses is the oldest botanical garden in the former British territories. On the other hand, its origin is often traced to 1768, when Pierre Poivre became director. Either way, it was one of the oldest and the most remarkable botanical collections in the tropics.

== Function ==
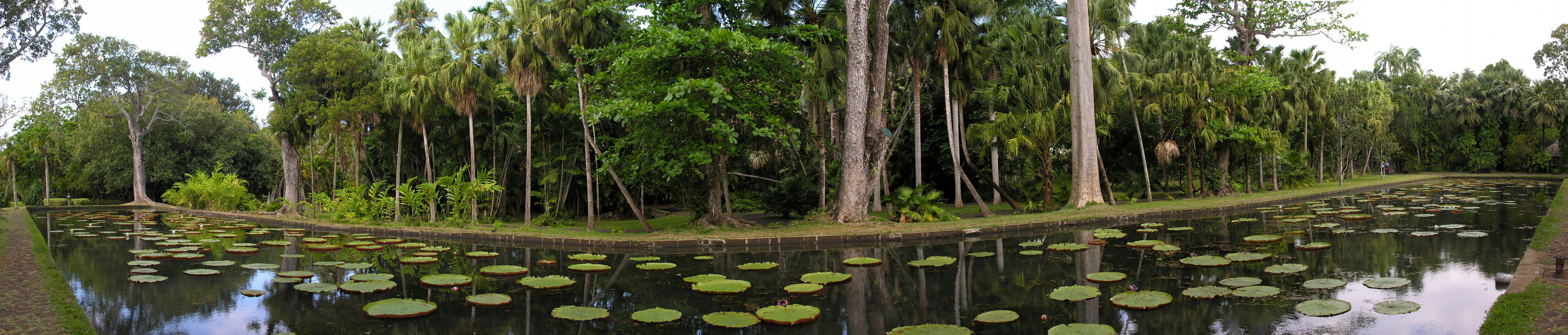
View of the giant water lilies (Victoria amazonica) pond.

Pamplemousses was probably the earliest of the 'botanical gardens' in the tropics, as these gardens sometimes acquired botanical status under the directorship of a botanist who would establish a herbarium.

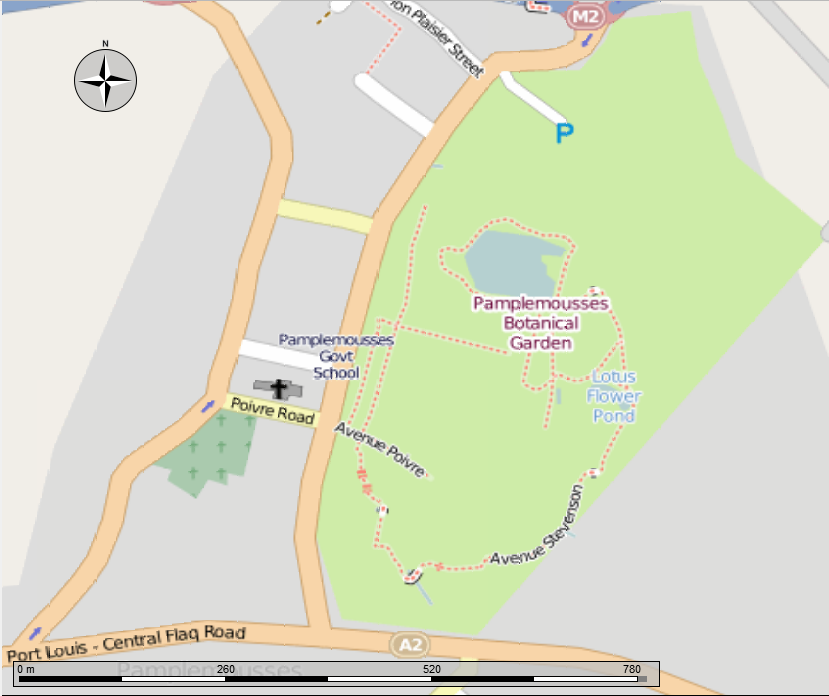
Map showing the extent of the Garden.

The garden was also used as a nursery for the planting and acclimatization of plants of botanical and economic importance that were introduced mostly from Europe and the East. Chief among the first introductions was cassava (manioc), which Labourdonnais brought from Brazil to provide food for the island's slaves.

In 1739, the French East India Company took possession of Mon Plaisir and almost the entire estate was planted with mulberry trees in the hope of establishing a silkworm industry. Subsequently, the mulberries were replaced by a plantation of bois noir (Albizia lebbeck), the charcoal of which could be used in the manufacture of gunpowder. The French had taken possession of the island as a naval base and the administration was geared towards taking precautions against the island being involved in a war.

When Davis was appointed Governor in 1746, he built and resided at 'Le Réduit' and deserted the residence at Mon Plaisir, so that from 1746 until 1753, Mon Plaisir was virtually abandoned. Later, Jean Baptiste Christophore Fusée Aublet, a horticulturist, was sent to establish a drug house and to create a botanical garden; he lived first at Mon Plaisir but was unhappy and transferred all his plant collections to Réduit. He was at loggerheads with 'M. Le Poivre p' ('Mister Pepper') — as he used to call Pierre Poivre — over the identification of nutmeg plants (Myristica fragrans).

After two visits to the Isle de France, Pierre Poivre was appointed Intendant of the island in 1767. The following year, he occupied Mon Plaisir in his official capacity and in 1770 he purchased the estate for himself. He was the creator of the present gardens, since in addition to a nursery for the acclimatisation of the nutmeg and clove plants, he also gathered together numerous plants from other areas with as many indigenous plant species as he could. It is thanks to Poivre and his successor Nicolas Céré, who devoted his life and most of his personal fortune to create the gardens, that Pamplemousses became well known to leading naturalists and acquired the worldwide fame it has since retained.

Between 1810 and 1849, the gardens went through an unsettled and difficult period. In 1849, James Duncan was appointed director of the much neglected gardens. He restored the abandoned gardens to something of their former beauty and introduced numerous species of plants including many of the palms now represented in the gardens.

By the middle of the last century, the sugar industry had been fast developing, and the gardens provided a suitable site for the introduction of new cane varieties from other parts of the world. Dr. Charles Meller, one of the directors of the garden, was sent to Australia and New Zealand to bring new varieties of canes; unfortunately, he died in the course of the journey.

When the malaria epidemic struck Mauritius in 1866, much of the gardens were used as a nursery for the production of thousands of Eucalyptus tereticornis trees which were introduced in an attempt to control the disease by drying out the marshes of the country, the breeding places of mosquitoes.

The Director of the Botanic Gardens became in due course also the Conservator of forests. The gardens stayed under his care until the creation of the Department of Agriculture in 1913. The latter then took over the responsibility of the gardens and they have remained under its control ever since.

Following the death of Seewoosagur Ramgoolam in December 1985 part of the Botanical Garden became a crematorium as the former politician became the first person to be cremated within its grounds. Since 1985 other politicians have used the crematorium, where a permanent concrete Samadhi has been erected, to commemorate the anniversary of Ramgoolam's death.

Following the death of Anerood Jugnauth in June 2021 part of the garden became a crematorium as the former president and former prime minister became the second person to be cremated within its grounds. A permanent Samadhi has been erected, to commemorate the anniversary of Jugnauth’s death. A lotus statue has been placed on the Samadhi.
