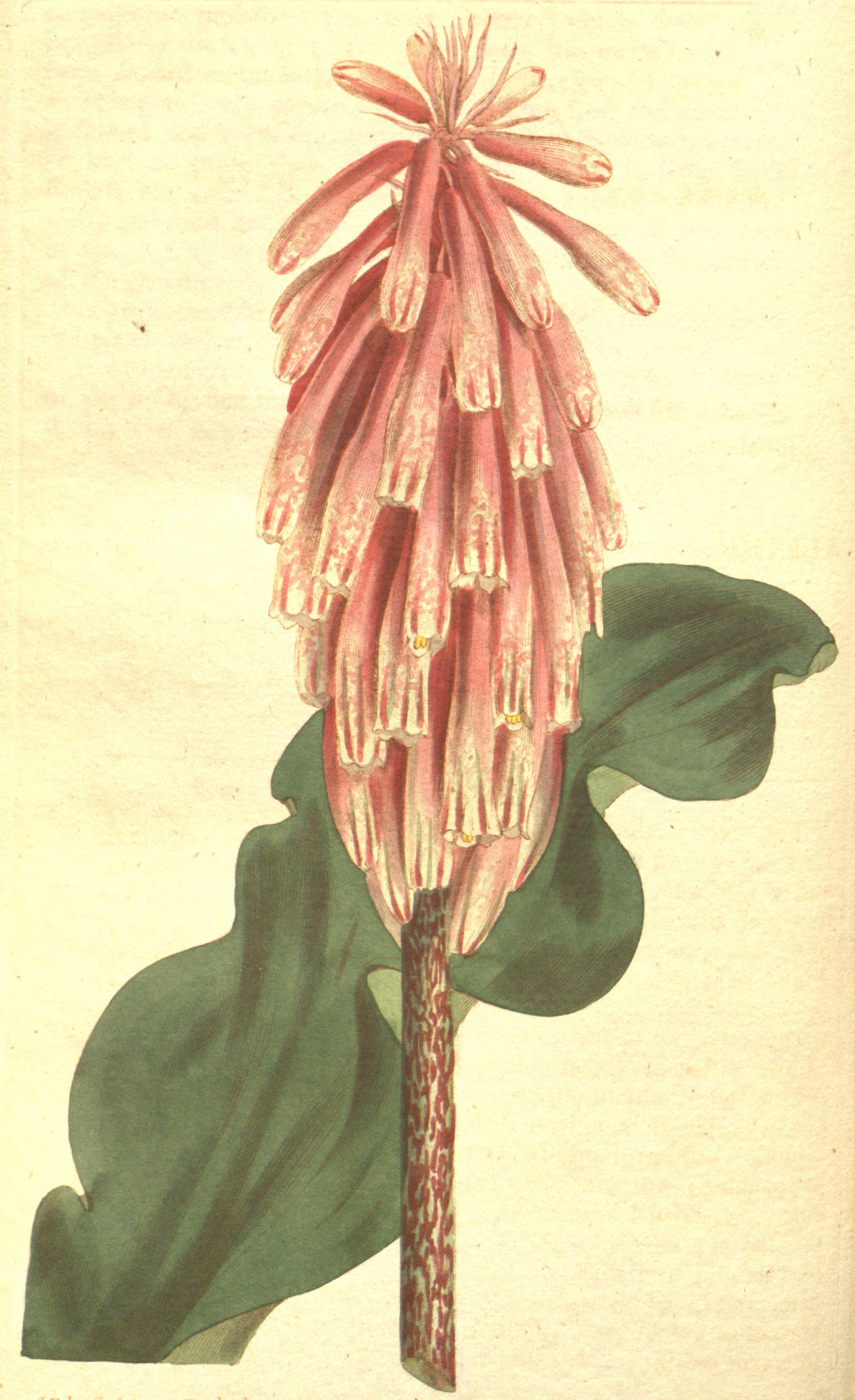
- The Botanical Magazine, vol.14

Scientific classification
- Kingdom: Plantae
- Clade: Tracheophytes
- Clade: Angiosperms
- Clade: Monocots
- Order: Asparagales
- Family: Asparagaceae
- Subfamily: Scilloideae
- Genus: Veltheimia
- Species: V. capensis

Binomial name
- Veltheimia capensis (L.) DC.

= Veltheimia capensis =

Species of flowering plant

Veltheimia capensis is one of two species of flowering plants belonging to the genus Veltheimia, of the family Asparagaceae. It is a tender bulbous perennial reaching a height of 46 cm (18 in), with flowers varying in color from white with red spots to pink with green or red markings.

== Morphology ==
Leaves of this plant are narrowly lance-shaped, thick and bluish green in color (see picture below). The average leaf size is 30 cm (12 in) long and 4 cm (1.6 in) across. The leaves retain their color throughout spring, summer and autumn. The leaves are in a whorled arrangement around the stem. Stems are also thick and are green in color, mixed with shades of purple. The most noticeable characteristic of the plant is its flower arrangement. Veltheimia capensis produces rosettes that are arranged in a raceme inflorescence that ultimately resembles a pendent-like shape. Individual flowers are tubular in shape and average 2–3 cm (~1in) in length. The flowers vary from white with red spots to pink with green or red markings. The plant generally flowers in spring and early summer.

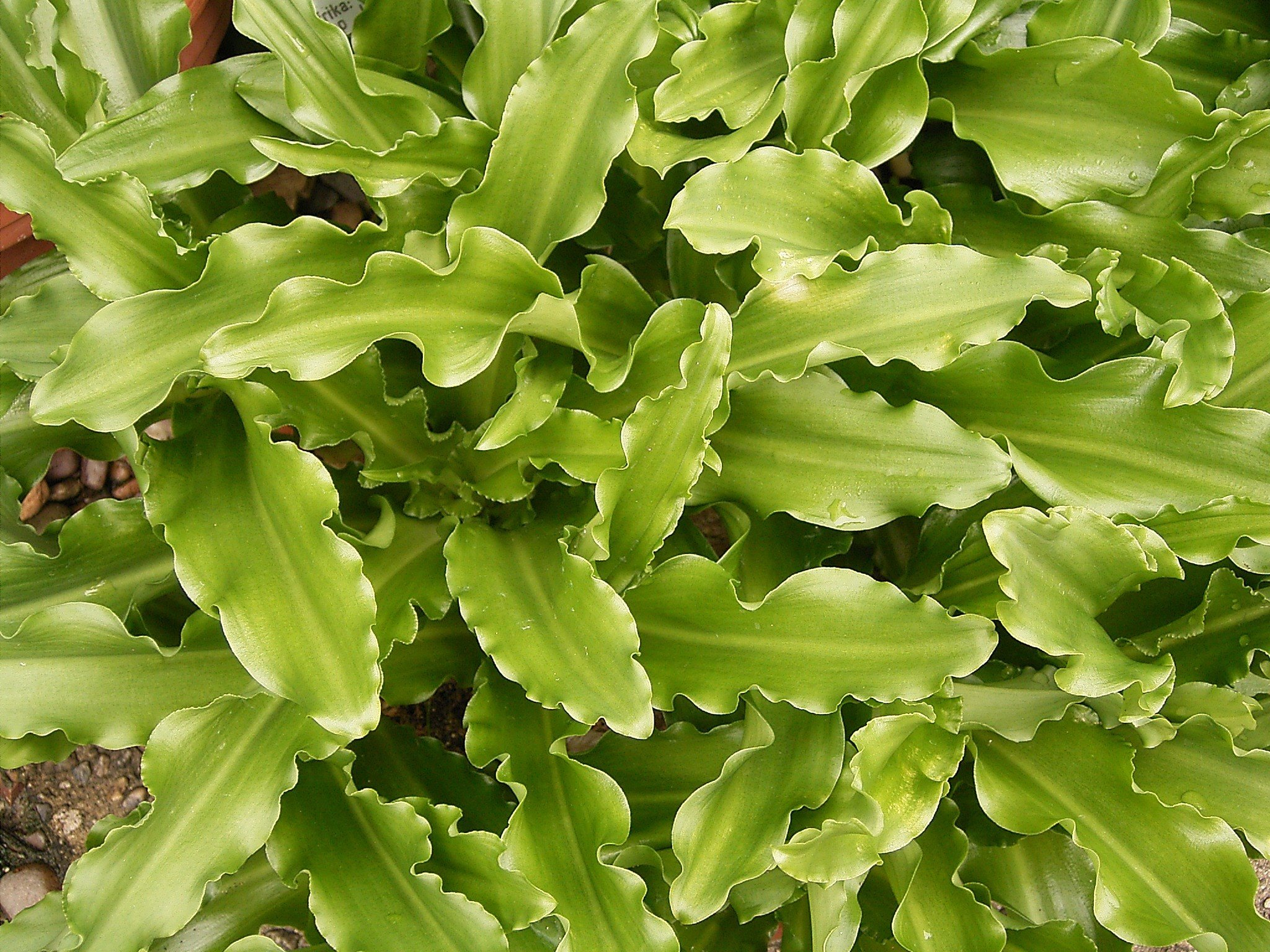

== Names ==
The specific epithet capensis refers to the Western Cape Province of South Africa, a native habitat for the plant. Common names include sand lily, elephant's eye and winter veltheimia.

== Distribution ==
V. capensis grows naturally in the dry, arid climate of the northern part of the Western Province in south-western South Africa. Its distribution includes the rocky slopes of Namaqualand and extends through to parts of the Little Karoo.

== Habitat and ecology ==
V. capensis germinates optimally at temperatures ranging from 19–24 °C (66–75 °F); however, it has also been known to grow in temperatures as low as 5–7 °C (41–45 °F). Soil conditions that are favorable for Veltheimia capensis are soils that are moderately fertile, well-drained and have a pH of 5.5-7.5. The composition of the soil is generally clay loam, loam, loamy sand, sandy clay loam and sandy loam.

== Cultivation ==
The plant is valued as a drought-resistant ornamental, though with a minimum temperature of 5–7 °C (41–45 °F), in temperate regions it must be grown under glass. It has gained the Royal Horticultural Society's Award of Garden Merit.

== See also ==
- List of plants known as lily
