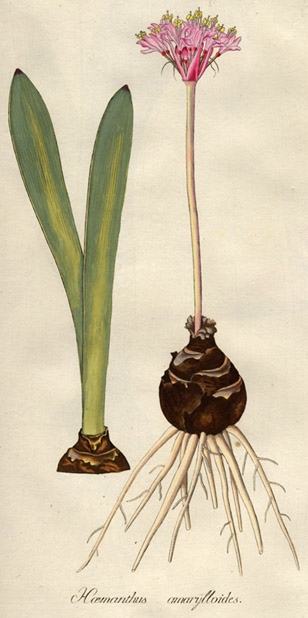

Scientific classification
- Kingdom: Plantae
- Clade: Tracheophytes
- Clade: Angiosperms
- Clade: Monocots
- Order: Asparagales
- Family: Amaryllidaceae
- Subfamily: Amaryllidoideae
- Genus: Haemanthus
- Species: H. amarylloides

Binomial name
- Haemanthus amarylloides Jacq. (1804)
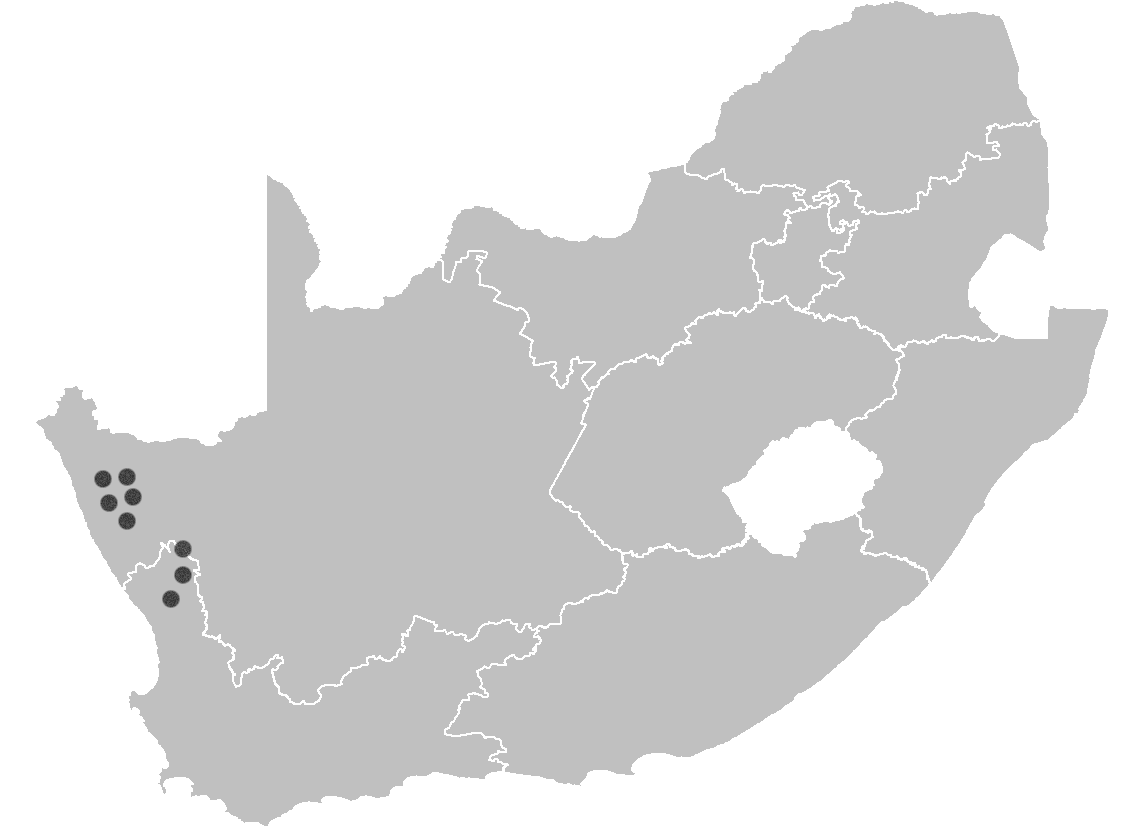
- Distribution of H. amarylloides in South Africa

Synonyms
- Amaryllis haemanthoidea Tratt.; Melicho amarylloides (Jacq.) Salisb. nom. inval.

= Haemanthus amarylloides =

Species of flowering plant

Haemanthus amarylloides Jacq. is an endemic South African bulbous plant. It was first described in 1804 by Nikolaus Joseph von Jacquin from specimens sent to the Schönbrunn Palace gardens by the collectors Boos and Scholl. Franz Boos was an Austrian botanist who, with Franz Bredemeyer, made up Emperor Joseph II's gardening team. Boos and his assistant Georg Scholl, were collecting Cape plants for the imperial gardens. These collections were transported to Vienna by Nicolas Thomas Baudin, who had been carefully briefed by Boos on the techniques used for keeping plants and animals alive on long ship voyages.

It belongs to the family Amaryllidaceae (subfamily Amaryllidoideae) and its specific name shows that Jacquin felt it resembled an Amaryllis. H. amarylloides is usually found in seasonally-inundated hollows at about 600 m elevation, between Springbok and Grootvlei in Namaqualand, and along the Bokkeveld Mountains escarpment to Gifberg near Vanrhynsdorp. It has a cone-shaped inflorescence of pale to dark pink flowers appearing from May to October. The two annual leaves are strap-shaped to broadly elliptical, carried erect or flat on the ground. Slight differences between the Gifberg and Vanrhyns Pass populations, support the notion of two subspecies for now, but finding intermediate forms may revert the taxon to a single, variable species.

The name "Haemanthus amarylloides" was repeatedly applied in error to specimens of a similar-looking species from the summer rainfall region. These specimens were subsequently separated and a new name of Haemanthus montanus was created for them.
