= Weilbach, Germany =

Weilbach
- Municipality
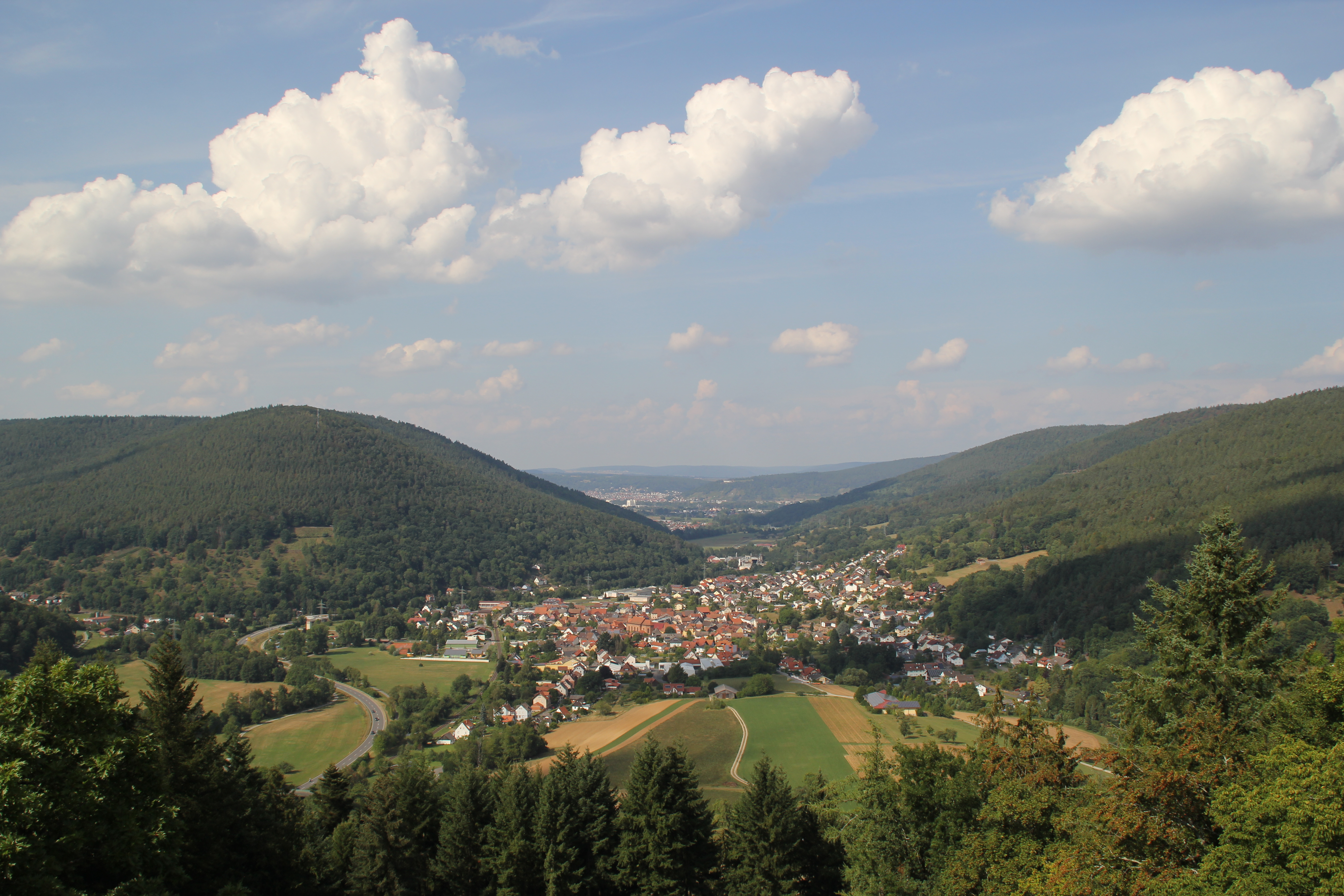
- Weilbach

- Coat of arms

- Location of Weilbach within Miltenberg district
- Interactive map of Weilbach
- Location within Germany Location within Bavaria
- Coordinates: 49°41′N 09°12′E
- Country: Germany
- State: Bavaria
- Admin. region: Unterfranken
- District: Miltenberg
- Subdivisions: 7 Ortsteile

Government
  - Mayor (2020–26): Robin Haseler (SPD)

Area
  - Total: 27.26 km^{2} (10.53 sq mi)
- Elevation: 152 m (499 ft)

Population (2025-12-31)
  - Total: 2,016
  - Density: 73.95/km^{2} (191.5/sq mi)
- Time zone: UTC+01:00 (CET)
  - Summer (DST): UTC+02:00 (CEST)
- Postal codes: 63937
- Dialling codes: 09373
- Vehicle registration: MIL
- Website: www.weilbach.de

Weilbach (German pronunciation: [ˈvaɪlbax]) is a market municipality in the Miltenberg district in the Regierungsbezirk of Lower Franconia (Unterfranken) in Bavaria, Germany.

== Geography ==
=== Location ===
Weilbach lies in the Bavarian part of the Odenwald (range).

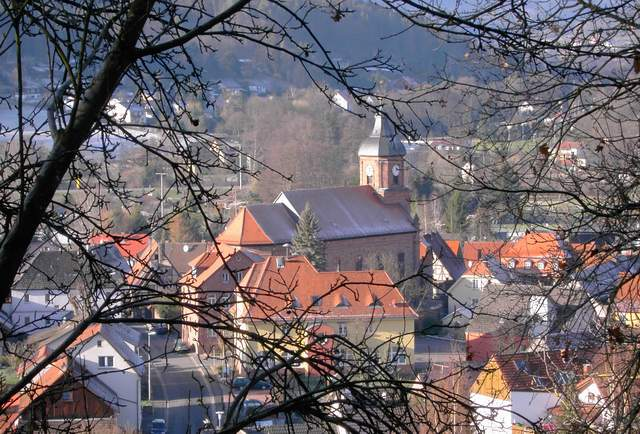
Weilbach church and old school

=== Constituent communities ===
The municipality is divided into the centres of Weilbach, Weckbach, Gönz, Reuenthal, Ohrenbach, Wiesenthal and Sansenhof.

== History ==
In 1201, Weilbach had its first documentary mention. The knight Cunrat von Wilenbach was witness to a land deal of the House of Dürn, which he served. The Lords of Dürn were Hohenstaufen ministeriales and from 1171 to 1272 protective Vögte of the Amorbach Monastery.

For most of its history, Weilbach was under Electoral Mainz lordship. In 1803, Weilbach was passed to the Principality of Leiningen, and along with this passed shortly thereafter to the Grand Duchy of Baden. A few years later (1810), Weilbach ended up with the Grand Duchy of Hesse-Darmstadt. Since 1816 it has belonged to Bavaria.

In 1977, under municipal reform, Weckbach with its outlying centres of Gönz, Ohrnbach, Wiesenthal and Sansenhof was amalgamated with Weilbach.

== Politics ==
=== Mayor ===
The mayor is Robin Haseler (SPD), he was first elected in 2020.

=== Municipal council ===
The council is made up of 14 council members, with seats apportioned thus:

- CSU 5
- Freie Wähler 5
- SPD 4

There are otherwise no further, active local party groups in Weilbach. The SPD, though, has a Young Socialist working group.

=== Coat of arms ===
The municipality's arms might be described thus: Per mantle argent a fountain with three spouts, dexter, affronty and sinister, before which a trough azure, in chief dexter gules a wheel spoked of six of the first, in chief sinister a cogwheel spoked of four and toothed of twelve of the first.

The Wheel of Mainz refers to Electoral Mainz's long rule over the community, as do the tinctures argent and gules (silver and red). The cogwheel refers to the long tradition of metalworking in the municipal area. The fountain is the municipality's landmark.

The arms have been borne since 1969.

== Culture and sightseeing ==
=== Buildings ===
There are the church and the historic centre with the Drei-Röhren-Brunnen (“Three-Pipe Fountain”). From the Gotthardsruine, half of which is within Amorbach’s town limits, there is a panoramic view over the Odenwald and on into the Spessart (range).

==== Gotthardsruine ====
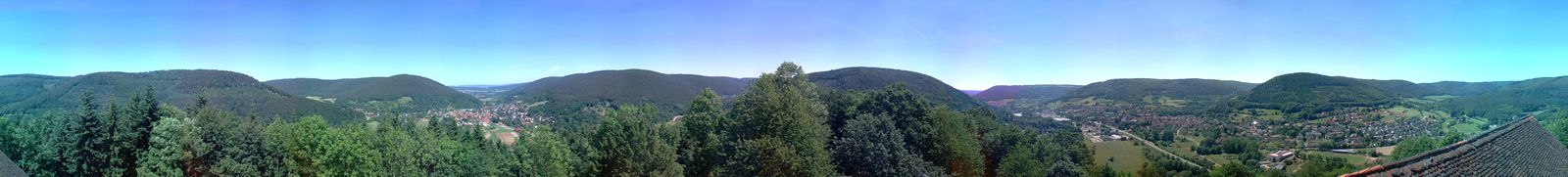
Panoramic view from the Gotthardsruine

The Gotthardsruine, a Gothic column basilica, stands on the summit of the nearby Gotthardsberg. From here there are views into seven dales and the surrounding hills. The “Gotthard”, once “Frankenberg”, was for a time a robber-baron's castle and then later a convent.

The first written account that has come down to the present goes back to the year 714. It was then that the Gaugraf (regional count) Ruthard von Frankenberg supposedly called the missionaries Saint Pirmin and Amor to the “Gotthard”. During the German Peasants' War (1525), rebels laid the “Gotthard” in rubble and ashes. In 1631, the church was built anew by Abbot Erhard Landecker. On 8 June 1714, the Gotthard Basilica was struck by lightning and destroyed. The ruins, such as they are today, were restored in 1956.

==== Dreiröhrenbrunnen ====
The Dreiröhrenbrunnen (“Three-Pipe Fountain”) is found in Weilbach's community core, right at an intersection. It has a great sandstone trough with a Baroque relief. The water squirts out through three spouts. The fountain even appears in the municipality's coat of arms, held as it is to be one of its landmarks. At the opening of Carnival (known locally as Fasching) by the Weilbacher Frösch Carnival Company on 11 November, the water is dyed green.

==== Mudmühle ====
On the northwest route out of Weilbach stands the mill with its Renaissance gable converted by Mainz court master builder Ambrosius Brosamer in 1585.

==== Hallsteine ====
These are a collection of interesting ancient stones on the Hallhöhe (heights) in Weilbach's west. A signposted hiking trail leads to this natural monument.

==== Glockenspiel ====
The Glockenspiel was added to the Town Hall in December 1991 with 24 bells. These ring daily at 9:10, 12:10 and 18:10. This was financed by a private initiative by Weilbach citizens and clubs under the umbrella of the Heimatverein Weilbach-Weckbach e.V. (local historical society).

Since 25 June 2006, the Glockenspiel – now expanded to 37 bells – plays in a specially built tower on the old schoolyard. One particularity is that the Glockenspiel can also be played by hand, making it a rarity in Bavaria, where there are only five functional carillons.

== Economy and infrastructure ==
At the beginning of the 19th century, the factory der Eisenhammer (“The Iron Hammer”), now belonging to The Linde Group, was founded. Several scale-modelling businesses that make moulded models consequently settled here.

A pallet factory works wood from the Odenwald.

At the new Gewerbegebiet-Süd (“Commercial Area South”), a logistics business and craft businesses have set up shop.

== Famous people ==
=== Honorary citizens ===
Paul Breunig (b. 6 January 1926; d. 24 August 2006) began working at the post of municipal secretary in 1946. From 1956 to 1985, he was mayor of the market municipality of Weilbach. Beginning in 1966 he was a Member of the Kreistag (district assembly) for three terms. From 1967 to 1984, as Chairman of the Bavarian Municipal Assembly (Bayerischer Gemeindetag), he took on responsibility for the Miltenberg district chapter.

For his outstanding services, he was awarded the Bundesverdienstkreuz with Ribbon. Furthermore, he was the recipient of the Mayor's Medal in Gold of the market municipality of Weilbach. In 1985 he became an honorary citizen and in 1991 he was awarded the Kommunale Verdienstmedaille (a Bavarian medal for municipal service) in silver. On 24 August 2006, Paul Breunig died in his hometown, Weilbach.

=== Sons and daughters of the town ===
- Lorenz Breunig (b. 11 August 1882 – d. February 1945), Member of the Reichstag
- Elisabeth Schüssler-Fiorenza (b. 1938), Catholic feminist theologian
- Norbert Walter (b. 23 September 1944 in Weckbach), chief economist of Deutsche Bank Group
