= Pierre-Paul Saunier =

French gardener

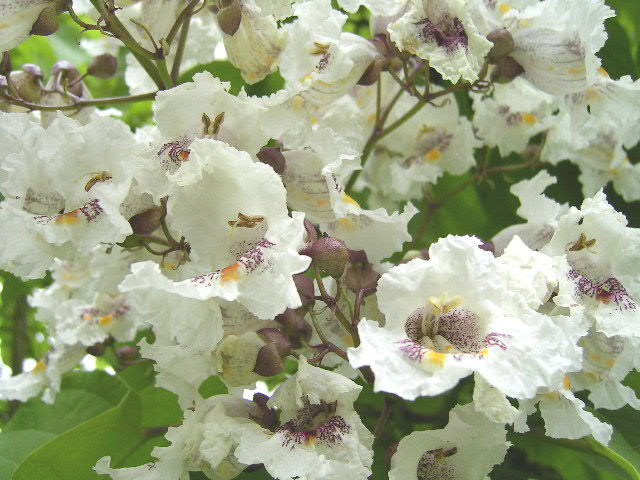
Catalpa bignonioides whose introduction to cultivation is attributed to Pierre-Paul Saunier

Pierre-Paul Saunier (1751–1818) was a gardener who worked first at Montbard in the Bourgogne region in eastern France, and then at the Jardin du Roi in Paris where he was a protégé of head gardener André Thouin (1746–1824). In 1785, Thouin selected him to accompany the explorer-botanist André Michaux (1746–1802) to North America where he was to assist in the establishment of a royal garden for the French crown.

Saunier was one of a number of gardener-botanists (see also Félix Delahaye (1767–1829), Anselme Riedlé (1775–1801), Antoine Guichenot (fl. 1801–1817), Jean Nicolas Collignon (1762–?1788), and Antoine Sautier (?–1801)) sent by Thouin from the Jardin du Roi on voyages of exploration to procure plants and plant products for the benefit of France and to assist botanists in the collection, transport and preservation of botanical specimens.

Saunier's life story has been assembled by William Robbins and Mary Howson of the New York Botanical Garden and Department of Botany, Columbia University: their account includes lists of seeds and plants sent by Saunier to France in 1788, 1790 and 1791 together with literature and letters relating to his life.

== Historical context ==
The Age of Discovery and Enlightenment from the 16th to 18th centuries resulted in European colonial expansion and the search for new commodities, including plant trophies and curiosities. This enterprise was centred in the tropics, but by the 18th century the European desire for plants and seeds had extended to temperate North America. Although captains of vessels, American residents and plant people of the New World were encouraged to exchange plants it was considered desirable to create gardens specifically for this purpose. It was in this context that King Louis XVI of France appointed botanist and naturalist André Michaux to establish a royal garden in North America to facilitate the accumulation of seeds and plants for shipment to France. The main purpose was to obtain plants useful for building and carpentry, forage and medicine; ornamental plants were of secondary importance. In the course of his 11-year stay, from 1785 to 1796, Michaux established two gardens, one in New Jersey, across the Hudson River from New York, the other in Charleston, South Carolina. He also sent back about 90 cases of seeds and 60,000 plants. Accompanying Michaux was the promising young gardener from the Jardin du Roi in Paris, Pierre-Paul Saunier, sometimes referred to as a journeyman gardener or élève du Muséum.

== Early history ==
Pierre-Paul Saunier was born at Saint-Aubin-sur-Gaillon, Eure department in Normandy in northern France, and became an apprentice gardener at the Jardin du Roi in Paris.

== Arrival in America and establishment of gardens ==
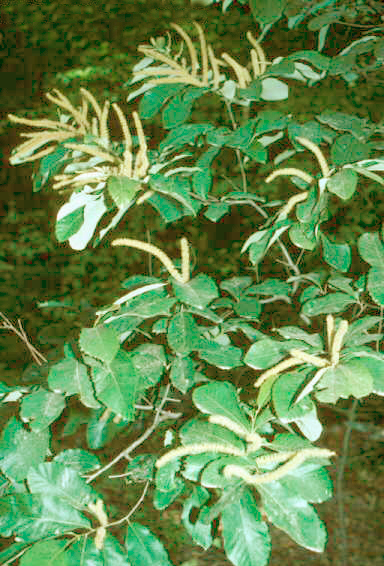
Chinquapin Castanea pumila whose introduction to cultivation is attributed to Pierre-Paul Saunier

André Michaux, his son François-André Michaux, Pierre-Paul Saunier, and a domestic, Jacques Renaud, left France on 26 September 1785, when Saunier was 34, arriving at New York on 13 November. Collecting started immediately and, by December, 5 boxes had been shipped to France. Michaux was answerable to comte d'Angiviller (1730–1810) who had been appointed Director of the Jardin du Roi on the death of the famous naturalist Buffon (1707–1788). By January 1786, Michaux wrote to Count d’Angiviller that a further shipment of 12 boxes of trees had been sent and that a 29-acre plot had been selected for the royal garden in the vicinity of New York at Maisland in Bergen, New Jersey on the western slope of Hudson Palisades, adjacent to extensive woods where seeds and young trees could be obtained. A house of 4 rooms was constructed, Michaux purchasing 2 horses and a cart together with tools, and Saunier was placed in charge. His pay was meagre and requests, including one by Thouin, were made that he be allowed to cultivate parts of the garden for himself, which was granted.

The Frenchman's Garden, as it was known, was essentially utilitarian, a temporary storehouse for material on its way to France. It was set out in beds with the plants ready for transplanting. Near the house was a nursery and vegetable garden. Local shrubs were planted in rows, more distant plants in small groups or singly. A large part of the garden was a cedar swamp where there was the Chinquapin and plantings of Kalmia and Magnolia.

Michaux went south in 1786 to find stock and gain advice but was disappointed by the lack of knowledge and interest in horticulture. He visited George Washington (1732–1799), William Bartram (1739–1823) eminent American botanist and naturalist, the son of John Bartram (1699-1777), who founded he Philadelphia Botanical Garden in 1728, and lumber baron William Hamilton (?-1822). By September 1786 he had selected a site for a second garden of 111 acres in Charleston, Carolina and here he stayed, with occasional visits to Saunier in New York, until departing for France in August 1796. In 1802 Michaux joined, as botanist, the Baudin expedition charged with charting the coast of New Holland, but he quarrelled with Baudin, leaving the ship at Mauritius and dying of a tropical fever while botanising in Madagascar in 1802.

== Closure of gardens ==
During the French Revolution the New Jersey garden was ignored and in 1791 the French Government decided to close the two gardens and in 1792 Michaux settled accounts for the garden. Saunier made no shipments of either seed or plants from 1792 to 1802, he did not communicate with the French government and his salary was stopped: the garden at Charleston was abandoned. François-André Michaux returned to America from France in 1801 arranging immediately for the sale of the Charleston garden. The potential sale of the New Jersey Garden disturbed Saunier who managed to prevent its occurrence and there was some contretemps between Saunier and Francois-André Michaux over both the sale and Saunier’s back-pay. Eventually the garden was owned by Saunier because it was part of a larger area owned by his son Michael. Saunier continued making shipments to France for the rest of his life and this was continued by Michael, but decreasing until 1830 when they ceased with a final shipment of three small boxes and its nursery functions ceased. The garden had disappeared as a government institution in about 1807. The site is now part of Machpelah Cemetery in North Bergen

== Family ==
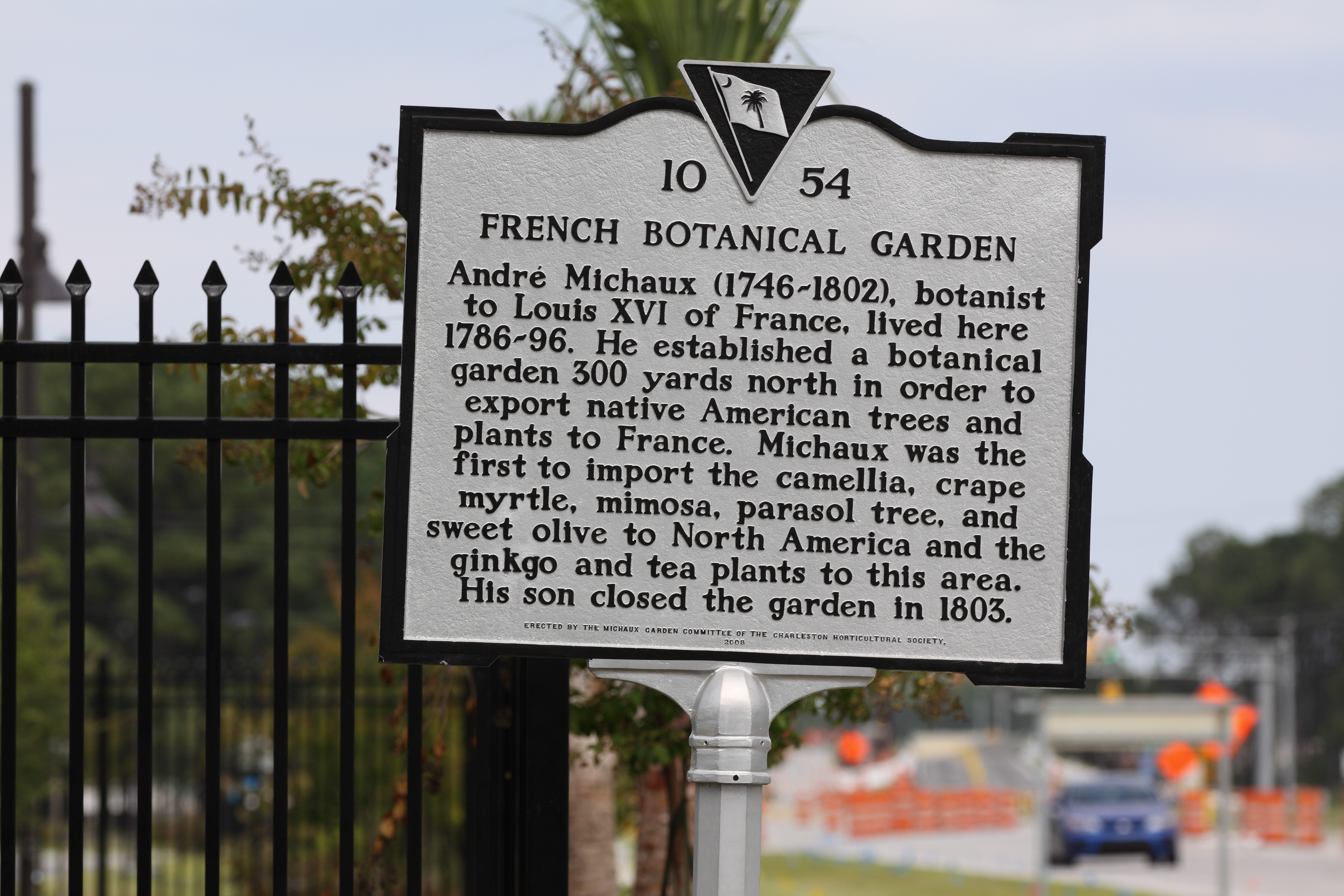
Historical marker for the Michaux garden, known as "The Frenchman's Garden" located off Aviation Ave in the City of North Charleston

In the late 1780s or early 1790s Saunier had married Margaret Ackerman from a prominent Dutch-American family in Bergen and Hudson County. They had two sons, Michael (b.1794) and Abraham (b.1797) and two daughters, Angelick and Margaret Saunier made 5 land purchases to add to the garden. Horticultural knowledge Saunier had gained at the Jardin des Plantes and in America was willingly passed on to the locals. Saunier died in 1818 aged 67 and after his death son Michael took over the nursery business and farm continuing to purchase land for the estate, the land in 1841 consisting of about 137 acres. However, the estate did not last much beyond the death of Michael in 1844 as it was split into small land holdings. Today the site consist of the Hoboken cemetery, warehouses, railroad and marshes along Cromahill Creek. Nothing marks the spot of the Jersey garden, although Michaux's garden at Charleston has a commemoration plaque. Great-great grandchildren were alive when the account on which this article is based was written.

== Plant introductions ==
To Michaux, and a much lesser extent Saunier, is attributed the first introduction of trees and shrubs from eastern North America. To Saunier in particular is attributed the introduction to cultivation of the Chinquapin, Castanea pumila, and Bean Tree Catalpa bignonioides although William Jackson Bean in his Trees and Shrubs Hardy in the British Isles refers to its introduction to cultivation, at least in the British Isles, in 1729. In Volume One of the same work Bean notes that, at that time of his writing, some of the trees raised from the seed of Michaux's collections in America could still be seen in the gardens of Petit Trianon and Arboretum de Balaine.

== See also ==
- List of gardener-botanist explorers of the Enlightenment
- European and American voyages of scientific exploration

== Bibliography ==
- Bean, William J (1992). Trees and Shrubs Hardy in the British Isles. London: John Murray. ISBN 0-7195-2256-0.
- Robbins, William, J; Howson, Mary C (1958). "André Michaux's New Jersey Garden and Pierre Paul Saunier, Journeyman Gardener". Proceedings of the American Philosophical Society. 102 (4): 351–370.
- Spary, Emma C. (2000). Utopia's Garden. French Natural History from Old Regime to Revolution. Chicago: University of Chicago Press. ISBN 0-226-76863-5.
