= George Austin (gardener) =

Colonial Australian gardener

- Born: fl. 1780s
- Occupation: Gardener
- Years active: 1788–1789
- Employer: Royal Botanic Gardens, Kew
- Known for: Propagation of plants for Colonial Australia

George Austin (fl. 1780s) was one of two gardeners trained at the Royal Botanic Gardens, Kew, in London and sent by Joseph Banks to care for plants on a voyage to the British colony in New Holland in 1789. Austin departed England via HMS Guardian (1784), a ship of the Second Fleet. However, he did not arrive in New Holland, after the Guardian hit an iceberg on 24 December 1789, east of the Cape of Good Hope.

== Mission to New Holland, now Australia ==
Together with fellow gardener James Smith, Austin travelled on the storeship HMS Guardian carrying supplies to the new colony as a follow-up to the ships of the First Fleet which had arrived at Botany Bay in January 1788. The vessel was specially fitted out to carry agricultural crops to the new colony and the two gardener were to care for the plants during the voyage.

Joseph Banks was a wealthy and influential botanist who planned much of the ship's cargo. He had designed and paid for construction of a ‘special plant-cabin’ to protect the more fragile plants from wind and salt spray. The Guardian’s quarter-deck was crowded with over one hundred boxes and tubs of trees, bulbs, plants and seedlings, at least some of which supplied by Hugh Ronalds, a nurseryman in Brentford. Special racks were made for the pots.

Banks gave the gardeners strict and extensive instructions concerning the care of the plants and even encouraging them to avoid drunkenness. Upon arrival the gardeners were to then collect seed and live plants for return to Banks and Kew Gardens. They were to train a sailor to care for the plants on this return journey as they were to stay in the colony. They were also ordered to collect plants and seed only for Banks and Kew. Supplying collections to others could be a lucrative business and, it seems, Austin in defiance of Banks had promised to collect seed for nurserymen in England. Austin tried to persuade Smith to join his scheme but Smith wrote to Banks to tell him of Austin's plans. All to be of no consequence as it turned out.

== Voyage ==
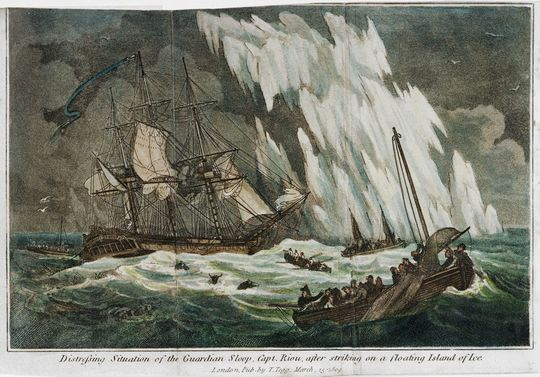
An 1809 artist's impression of storeship HMS Guardian (1784) under the command of Captain Edward Riou striking an iceberg on the way to New Holland

HMS Guardian, under the command of Lieutenant Edward Riou, set sail from Spithead on 8 September 1789, and had an uneventful voyage to the Cape of Good Hope, and arrived on 24 November 1789 loaded with provisions, farm machinery, agricultural crops and livestock to a value of some £70,000, together with convicts and their overseers. At the Cape, the ship took on more provisions, plants and convicts. On Christmas Eve, twelve days after his departure from the Cape, and with the animals and plants making heavy demands on the ship's water supply, the sighting of an iceberg was an opportunity to collect fresh water. In poor weather conditions the ship collided with the iceberg. Most of the crew (including the gardeners), was tragically lost when the ship, while collecting ice to supplement the freshwater supply (depleted by the needs of plants and animals on board) struck an iceberg in the Southern Ocean off southern Africa. The Guardian was badly damaged and, being in danger of sinking, Riou allowed most of the crew to take to ship's boats, Austin and Smith being among those that took to boats and were never seen again.

Riou managed to struggle back to the Cape taking nine weeks and here the ship was run aground to prevent her sinking, only to be wrecked during a hurricane. The remains were sold in 1790. Riou survived this event only to be killed by round shot at the Battle of Copenhagen on 2 April 1801.

== See also ==
- List of gardener-botanist explorers of the Enlightenment
