= James Smith (gardener) =

One of two gardeners trained at the Royal Botanic Gardens, Kew, in London

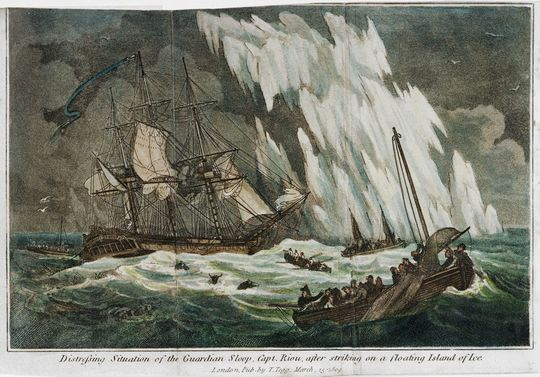
An 1809 artist's impression of storeship HMS Guardian under the command of Captain Edward Riou striking an iceberg on the way to New Holland

James Smith (fl. 1780s) was one of two gardeners trained at the Royal Botanic Gardens, Kew, in London and sent by Joseph Banks to care for plants on a voyage to the British colony in New Holland (Australia) in 1789. Together with fellow gardener George Austin, Smith travelled on the fated storeship HMS Guardian carrying supplies to the new colony as a follow-up to the ships of the First Fleet which had arrived at Botany Bay in January 1788. The vessel was specially fitted out to carry agricultural crops to the new colony and the two gardeners were to care for the plants during the voyage. Plants were supplied by Brentford nurseryman Hugh Ronalds, at Banks' request.

== See also ==
For details of the voyage and its fate see George Austin.

- List of gardener-botanist explorers of the Enlightenment
- European and American voyages of scientific exploration.

== Bibliography ==
- Coleman, Ernest (2006). The Royal Navy in Polar Exploration: From Frobisher to Ross. Stroud: Tempus (The History Press). ISBN 0-7524-3660-0.
- Finney, Colin M. (1984), To sail beyond the sunset: natural history in Australia 1699-1829, Melbourne: Rigby, ISBN 0-7270-1881-7
