= List of gardener-botanist explorers of the Enlightenment =

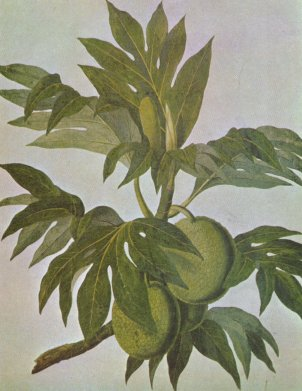
Breadfruit (Artocarpus altilis) A much-sought-after and transported plant in the Age of Enlightenment Painted by John Miller

The Age of Discovery, also known as the Age of Exploration, was a period in history starting in the early 16th century and continuing into the early 19th century during which Europeans and the United States engaged in intensive exploration of the world, establishing direct contacts with Africa, the Americas, Asia and Oceania and mapping the planet. Scientific matters at this time were of little interest as exploration was mostly commercially and politically motivated. Captivated by the lure of gold, silver and spices, Portuguese and Spanish sailors pioneered new trade routes to the Indies.

The Age of Discovery was followed in the late 18th and early 19th centuries by the Age of Enlightenment (also known as the Age of Reason) which was an era of scientific awakening with a strong belief in the power of reason as the primary source of legitimacy and authority. Scientific fervour and intellectual curiosity at this time resulted in many voyages of scientific exploration around the world facilitated by technological innovations that included the theodolite, octant, precision clocks, as well as improvements in the compass, telescope, and general shipbuilding techniques. Naturalists, including botanists and zoologists, were an integral part of these voyages and the new discoveries were recorded not only in their journals but by on-board illustrators and artists.

Among the naturalists on these colonial voyages of scientific exploration were gardener-botanists. Their duty was to assist with the collection, transport, cultivation and distribution of economic plants. They worked with the naturalists on these expeditions, mostly as botanical assistants, collecting live plants and seed, as well as plant specimens for herbarium collections. They often maintained journals and records of their collections and made observations on the vegetation encountered during the voyage. Their specialist skills as horticulturist-gardeners were often combined with a knowledge of botany as they cared for the economically important plant cargos, often living, on the long sea journeys. Gardener-botanists were instrumental in the transport around the globe of newly discovered ornamental plants for the estates of the European wealthy, as well as crops like spices, breadfruit, coffee, quinine, rubber and other important economic crops, a duty that required specially designed cabinets and equipment like the Wardian Case. Their lowly status as gardeners meant that their history has been overshadowed by that of their botanical supervisors. Naturalists on these expeditions generally enjoyed the privileges of the officers — including eating with the captain and the relative comfort of special sleeping quarters; in contrast, the gardeners would be bunked with the crew. The best-known gardener-botanists included those sent from the Schönbrunn Palace in Vienna, but mainly the Jardin du Roi (after the Revolution this became the Jardin des Plantes at the Muséum d'Histoire Naturelle) in Paris and the Royal Botanic Gardens, Kew in London as France and Britain sought to expand their colonial empires and influence by sea.

== Sent by André Thouin from the Jardin du Roi ==
During the Enlightenment both France and England organised elaborate programs of plant introduction to explore the potential of plants not only as food for their colonies but as botanical novelties of all kinds. In Paris the project planning was placed in the hands of the Head Gardener of the Jardin du Roi, André Thouin, who recommended an inventory of plants, both native and exotic, in each colony, and the development of a reciprocal exchange – all under the control of the garden in Paris. Part of this program was the sending of outstanding horticulturists and botanists (élèves-botanistes and élèves-jardiniers) on voyages of scientific exploration.

- Joseph Martin (fl.1788–1826) a gardener who worked at the Jardin du Roi in Paris sent by Thouin to collect on the Ile de France, Madagascar, Cape and Caribbean.
- Jean Nicolas Collignon (1762–?1788) French gardener on the French La Pérouse expedition to the South Seas, 1785–1788, on the flagship Boussole.
- Pierre-Paul Saunier (1751–1818) a French gardener who, in 1785, accompanied the botanist André Michaux to North America where he assisted in the establishment of a garden for the French crown.
- Félix Delahaye (1767–1829) a French gardener who served on the Bruni d'Entrecasteaux expedition (1791–93) which was sent by the French National Assembly to search for the missing explorer La Pérouse.
- Anselme Riedlé (1775–1801) A French gardener on Nicolas Baudin's scientific expedition (1800–1804) in the corvettes Géographe and Naturaliste to chart the coast of New Holland (Australia), make scientific observations and collect natural history specimens. He was Head Gardener in a team of five gardeners on this expedition.
- Antoine Sautier (?–1801) an Assistant Gardener who served on Nicolas Baudin's scientific expedition (1800–1804) in the corvettes Géographe and Naturaliste to chart the coast of New Holland (Australia), make scientific observations and collect natural history specimens. He was a member of a team of five gardeners that served under Head Gardener Anselme Riedlé. He died at sea on 15 November 1801.
- Antoine Guichenot (fl. 1801–1817) a French Assistant Gardener who served on Nicolas Baudin's scientific expedition (1800–1804) in the corvettes Géographe and Naturaliste to chart the coast of New Holland (Australia), make scientific observations and collect natural history specimens. He was a member of a team of five gardeners that served under Head Gardener Anselme Riedlé. He survived to serve on the 1817 voyage under Louis de Freycinet).
- François Cagnet a French Assistant Gardener who served on Nicolas Baudin's scientific expedition (1800–1804) in the corvettes Géographe and Naturaliste to chart the coast of New Holland (Australia), make scientific observations and collect natural history specimens. He was a member of a team of five gardeners that served under Head Gardener Anselme Riedlé but became ill and abandoned his ship when he landed at the Ile de France. Gardener Merlot also disembarked at the Ile de France.
- George Samuel Perrottet (1793–1870) was a Swiss-born French botanist and horticulturalist from the Jardin des Plantes. In 1819-21 he was employed as a naturalist gardener on an expedition commanded by Naval Captain Pierre Henri Philibert. Perottet's duties on the journey involved collecting plants in Réunion, Java, and the Philippines for re-plantation and cultivation in Guyane.

== Sent by Sir Joseph Banks from the Royal Botanic Gardens, Kew ==
Joseph Banks, following his botanical collecting with Daniel Solander at Botany Bay and elsewhere in New Holland, had maintained a keen interest as a patron of scientific work in this region. His paid collectors were sent there at first as visiting explorers, and later as temporary or permanent residents who would return specimens to Banks or Kew.

- Francis Masson (1741–1805) was a Scottish botanist and gardener, and Kew Gardens’ first plant hunter; sent from Kew by the newly appointed Sir Joseph Banks he sailed with James Cook on HMS Resolution to South Africa, landing in October 1772. He stayed until 1775 and sent back to England over 500 plant species. In 1776 he went to Madeira, Canary Islands, the Azores and the Antilles. In 1783 he collected plants in Portugal and in January 1786 returned to South Africa, remaining until March 1795.
- Anthony Pantolean Hove Polish-born gardener sent to Gujarat, India in April 1787, officially to collect plants for Kew but unofficially to collect seed of cotton.
- David Nelson (?–1789) botanical collector and horticulturist on Cook's Third Voyage, 1776–1779, and on William Bligh's HMS Bounty (1787–1789).
- Peter Good (?–1802) assistant to Robert Brown, the botanist on Matthew Flinders' Voyage to Terra Australis (1801–1803).
- George Austin (fl.1780s) was one of two gardeners (the other being James Smith) trained at Kew and sent by Joseph Banks to care for mostly agricultural plants on the supply ship HMS Guardian which was sent to the British of New South Wales in New Holland (Australia) in 1789, about one year after the First Fleet. Plants were supplied by Hugh Ronalds, a nurseryman in Brentford.
- George Caley (1770–1829) was an English botanist, horticulturist and explorer sent to New Holland in 1799 (arriving at Port Jackson in April 1800) by Banks on a salary of 15 shillings a week, to collect plants and seed for Banks and the Royal Botanic Gardens Kew.
- William Baxter (died c. 1836) was an English gardener who collected in Australia on behalf of English nurserymen and private individuals.

== From the Botanic Gardens, Edinburgh ==
- William Milne (?-1866) was a Scottish gardener at the Edinburgh Botanic Garden who in 1852 joined the HMS Herald expedition to the southwest Pacific (1852–1856) as a botanist. The expedition visited, inter alia, Lord Howe Island, New South Wales, and Western Australia. Milne was accompanied by fellow Scots botanist John MacGillivray who left the ship early in 1855 after being dismissed as the result of a dispute with the captain Henry Denham.

== From the Palace of Schönbrunn in Vienna ==
- Franz Boos (1753–1832) was an Austrian gardener at the Schönbrunn Palace, Vienna, and a collector of natural history specimens for Emperor Joseph II of Austria, who reigned from 1765 to 1790. Boos traveled on two major scientific expeditions on behalf of the Emperor, the first was to America (1783–1785), the second to the Caribbean, Cape of South Africa and Mascarenes (1786–1788).
- Georg Scholl (fl. 1786) was a gardener at Schönbrunn Palace in Vienna, sent by Emperor Joseph II as assistant to Franz Boos to collect specimens for the royal garden and cabinet on a collecting trip to the Cape of South Africa.

== American ==
- John Bartram (1699–1777) an early North American botanist, horticulturist and explorer. A Quaker with no formal education he devoted a small area of his farm to growing interesting plants and later made contact with European botanists and gardeners willing to exchange North American plants.

== See also ==
- Ethnobotany
- European and American voyages of scientific exploration

== Bibliography ==
- Arnold, David (2002). The Age of Discovery, 1400–1600, Lancaster pamphlets. Routledge. ISBN 0-415-27996-8.
- Brosse, Jacques (1983). Great Voyages of Exploration. The Golden Age of Discovery in the Pacific. Transl. Stanley Hochman. Sydney: Doubleday. ISBN 0-86824-182-2.
- Duyker, Edward (2003). Citizen Labillardière. A Naturalist's Life in Revolution and Exploration (1755–1834). Melbourne: Miegunyah Press. ISBN 0-522-85010-3.
- Ly-Tio-Fane, Madeleine (1991). "A reconnaissance of tropical resources during Revolutionary years: the role of the Paris Museum d'Histoire Naturelle". Archives of Natural History. 18 (3): 333–362. doi:10.3366/anh.1991.18.3.333.
