= Cagnet =

Cagnet may refer to:

- Jean-François Cagnet (1756–?), French gardener
- Cagnet (airplane), designed by General Aircraft Ltd which flew from 1939 to 1941
- Cagnet (band), US musicians whose song became popular in Japan
