= Guichenot =

Guichenot may refer to

- Alphonse Guichenot (1809–1876), French zoologist
- Antoine Guichenot (fl. 1801–1817), French gardener, member of the 1801–1803 Baudin expedition to Australia
