= Pierre Sonnerat =

French naturalist, colonial administrator, writer and explorer

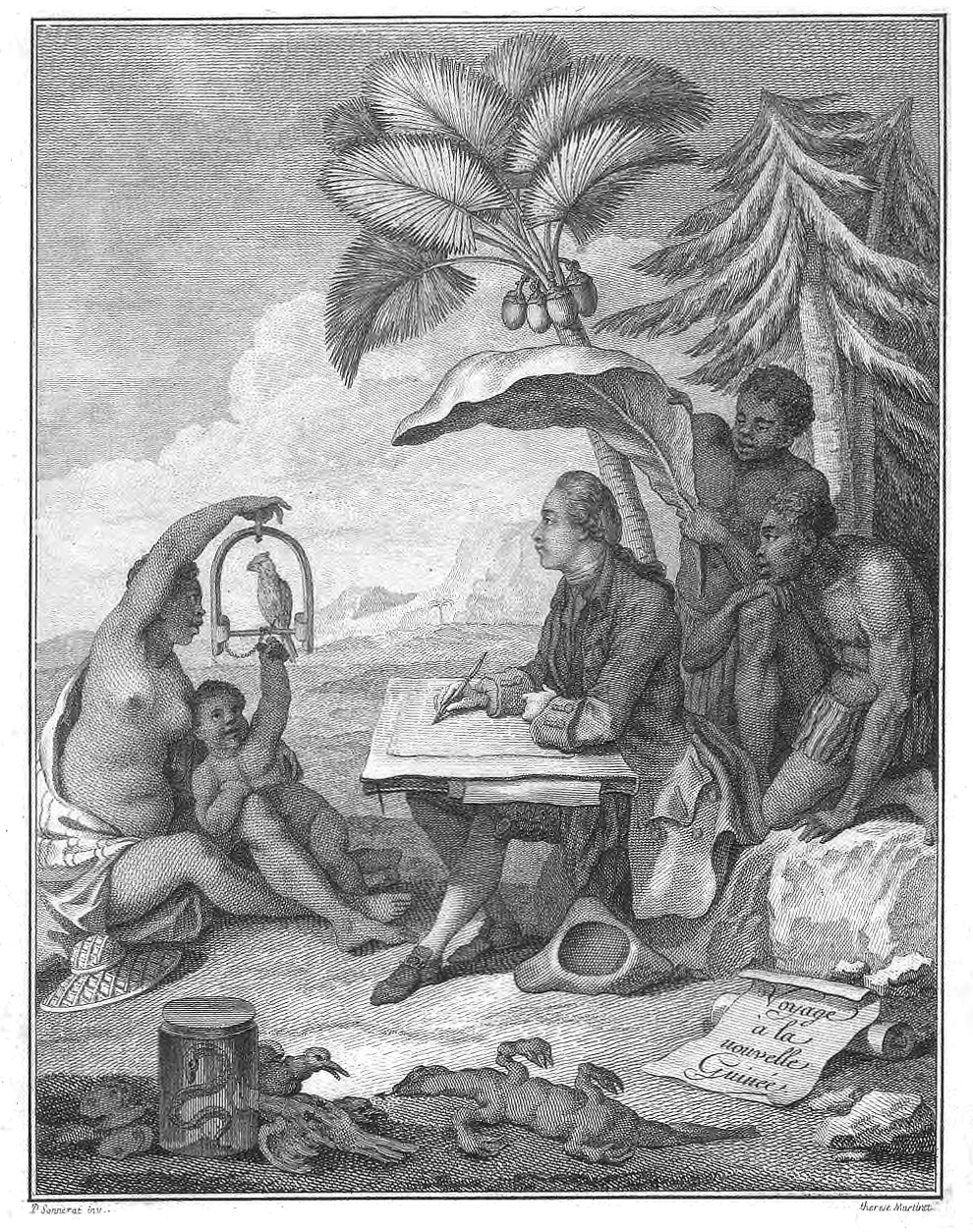
- Born: Pierre Sonnerat; 18 August 1748
- Died: 31 March 1814 (aged 65)

Pierre Sonnerat (18 August 1748 – 31 March 1814) was a French naturalist, colonial administrator, writer and explorer. He described numerous species of plants and animals on his travels and is honoured in the genus Sonneratia and in other specific names such as that of the grey junglefowl, Gallus sonneratii. The standard author abbreviation Sonn. is used to indicate this person as the author when citing a botanical name.

== Life and travels ==
Sonnerat was born in Lyon and was the nephew of the botanist Pierre Poivre (mother of Pierre Sonnerat, Benoîte Poivre, was a cousine of Pierre Poivre) who was a French colonial administrator in the Mascarenes. Sonnerat became a private secretary to his uncle Pierre and made several voyages to southeast Asia, visiting the Philippines and Moluccas between 1769 and 1772. In Mauritius, Sonnerat met the naturalist Philibert Commerson in 1767 and worked for him briefly, travelling to Reunion. He then worked as a naval commissar and travelled to India and China from 1774 to 1781 with a base in Yanam and Pondicherry. From 1781 to 1785, he was in France where he married Marguerite Ménissier. In 1786, he was posted in Pondicherry. Travelling around the Cape of Good Hope, he examined parts of southern Africa, southern India and Sri Lanka. In 1789, he was posted at Yanam and in 1795, he was briefly held prisoner of war by the English administration as England and France had gone to war. Sonnerat returned to Europe in 1813, meeting Joseph Banks in London and returned to Paris in 1814 where he died.

== Natural history ==
Sonnerat collected bird and plant specimens on his travels. He was the first person to give a scientific description of the south Chinese fruit tree lychee. It has been claimed that Sonnerat misinterpreted the call of a helpful Malagasy guide who had spotted a lemur and shouted "indri!" ("look!" in Malagasy). Sonnerat supposedly took this by "mistake" to be the animal's name, and it was called the Indri (Indri indri). This claim has been re-examined and it would appear that Sonnerat actually recorded a local name endrina which is still in use. The birds Dacelo novaeguineae and Pygoscelis papua, neither of which are found in New Guinea (Papua), were also misnamed due to Sonnerat. His books included Voyage à la Nouvelle-Guinée (1776) and Voyage aux Indes orientales et à la Chine, fait depuis 1774 jusqu'à 1781 (1782). The standard botanical author abbreviation Sonn. is applied to plants he described. His name is used in the specific name of the grey junglefowl (Gallus sonneratii).

A species of shrew in the genus Crocidura (or Diplomesodon) which has been described based on his manuscripts as Diplomesodon sonnerati is thought to have become extinct and was collected from around Pondicherry.

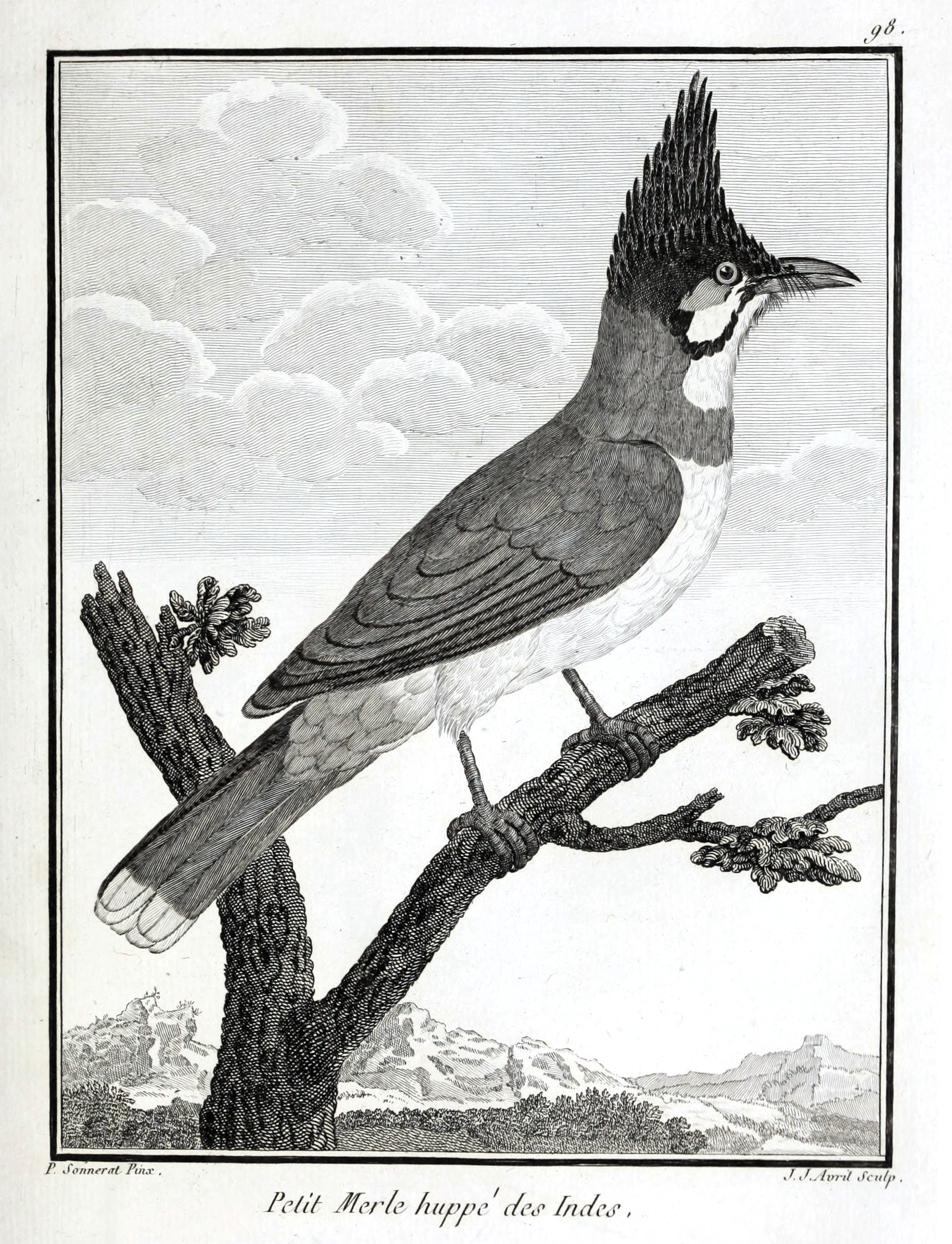
Red-whiskered bulbul

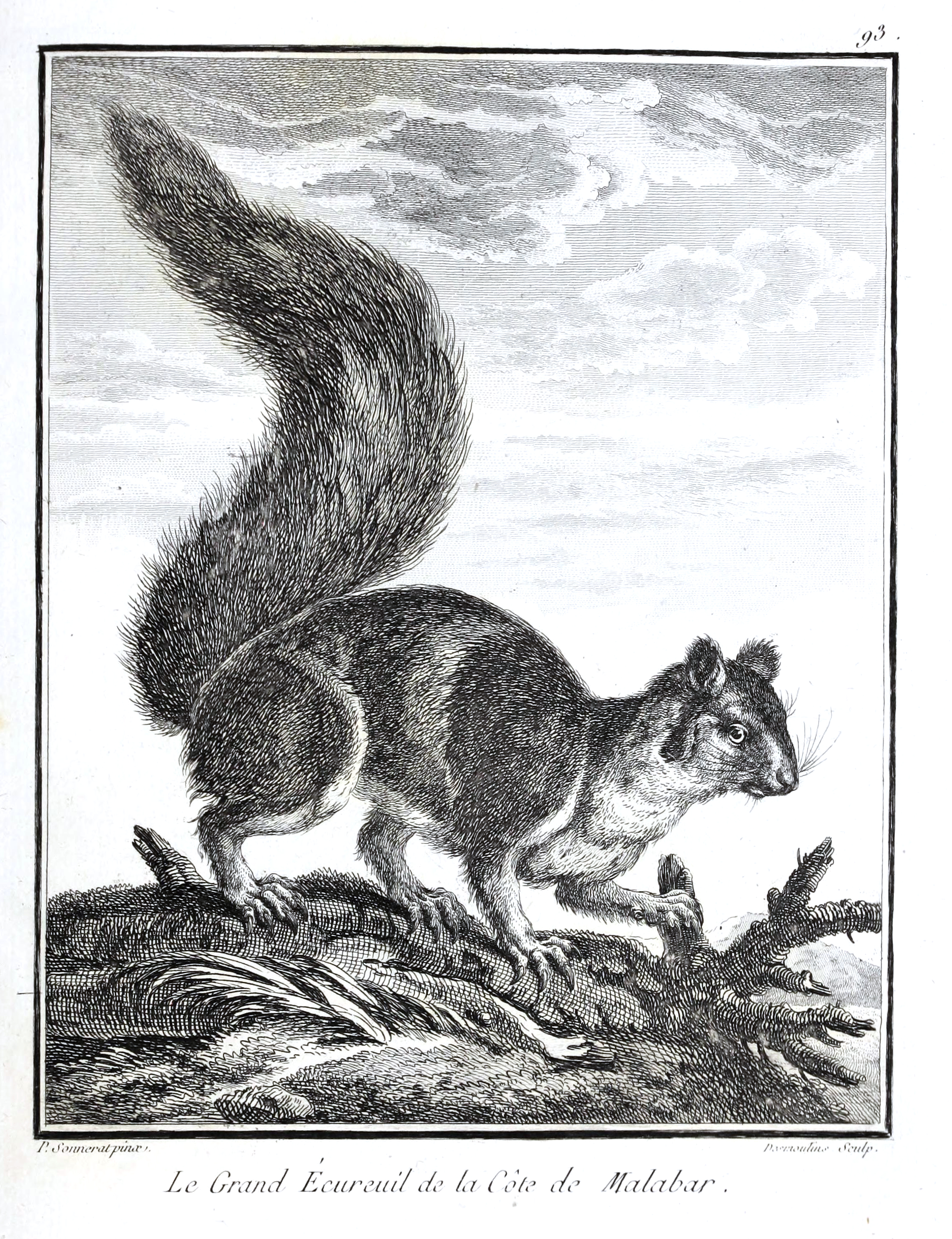
Malabar giant squirrel

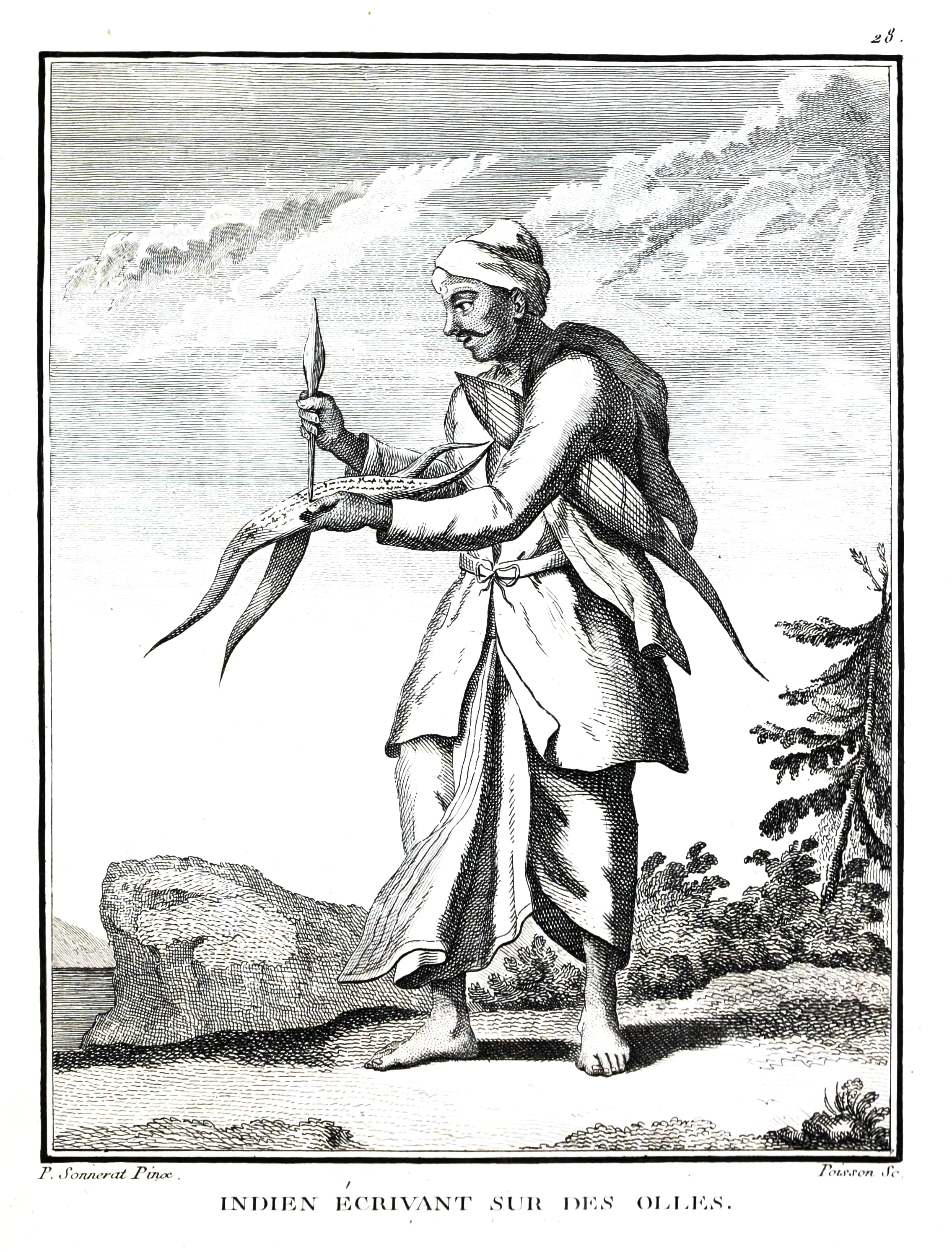
Indian scribe

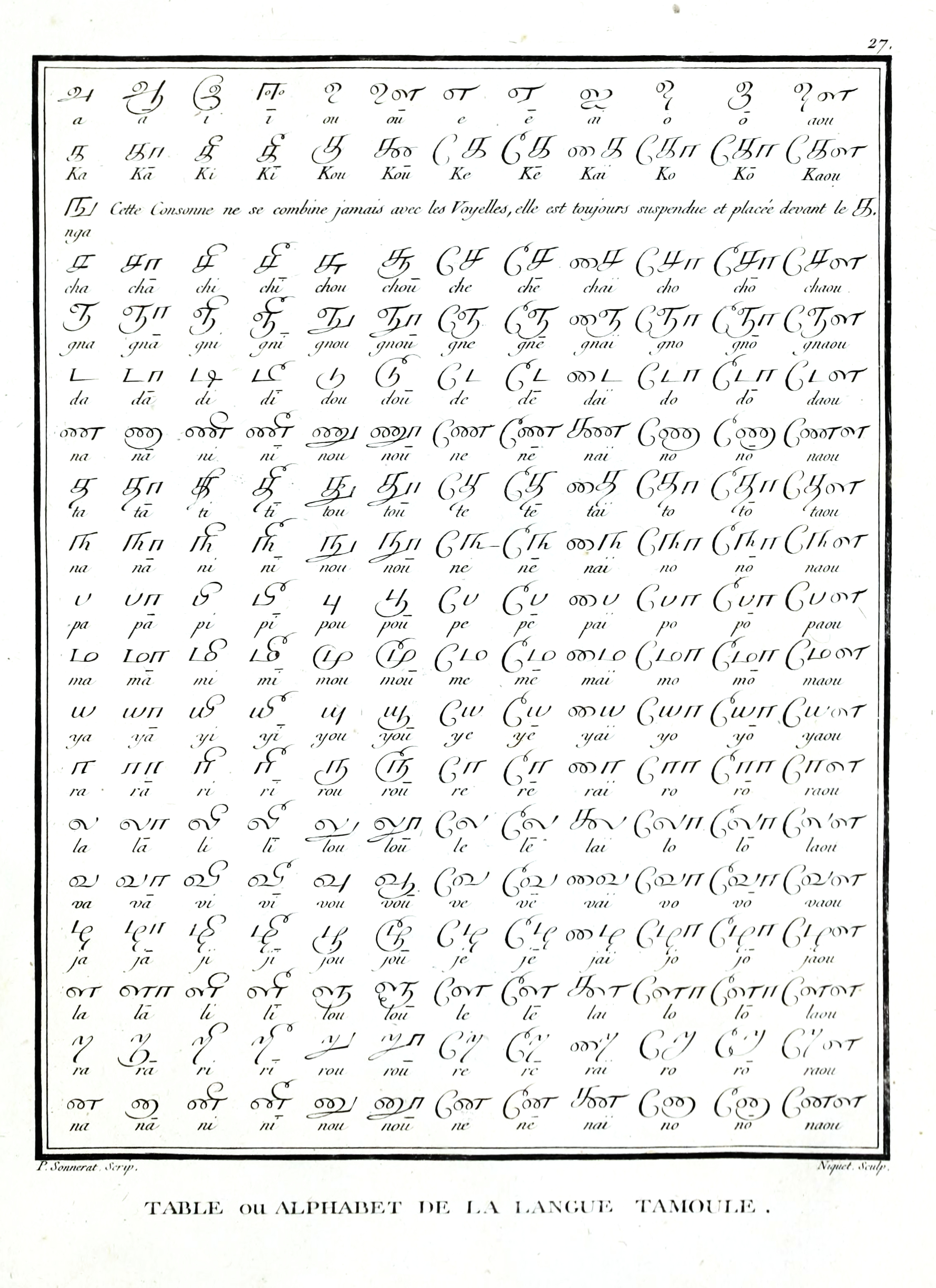
Tamil alphabet

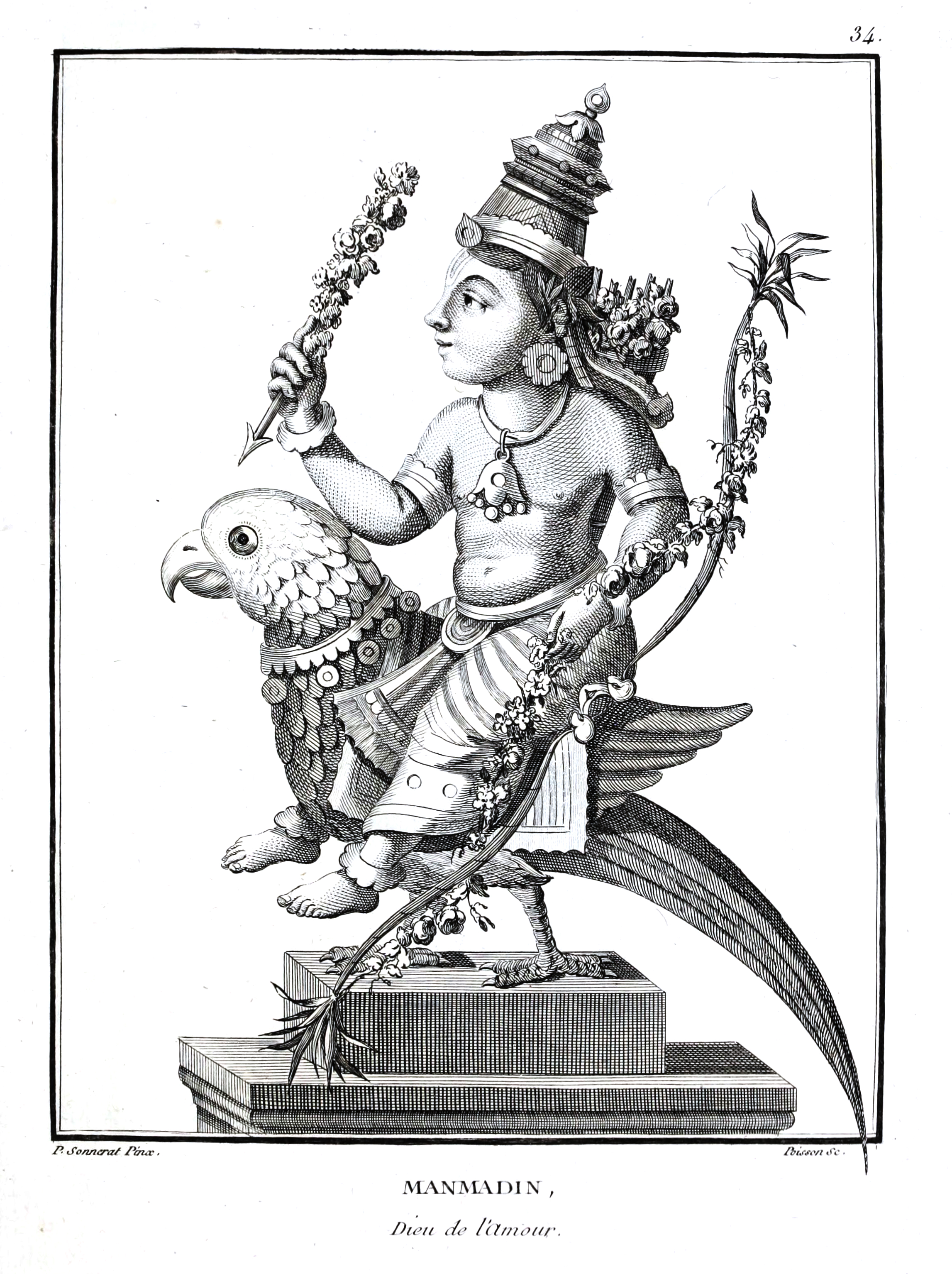
God of love on a parakeet

== See also ==
- European and American voyages of scientific exploration

== Biography ==
- Ly-Tio-Fane, Madeleine (1976). Pierre Sonnerat 1748–1814. An account of his life and work. Mauritius: Self published.
