= Jean-François Cagnet =

French gardener

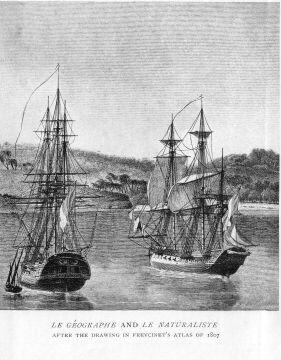
Corvettes Géographe and Naturaliste as illustrated in Freycinet's journal

Jean-François Cagnet, born in Baumont in c. 1756 (fl. 1790–1801), was a French gardener who worked under the botanist André Michaux in the course of the Nicolas Baudin voyage of scientific discovery (1800–1804).

The expedition sailed in two corvettes: the Géographe and the Naturaliste, in order to chart the coast of New Holland (now Australia), to make scientific observations and to collect biological specimens. This was possibly the largest such voyage of its kind in the early 19th century, having a team of 22 experts (scientists, artists and engineers), accompanied by some 120 sailors. He was a junior gardener in a team of 5 gardeners that served on the voyage, the others being Antoine Sautier, Merlot (listed as 'an African') and Antoine Guichenot, all under the supervision of Head Gardener Anselme Riedlé.

Cagnet left the expedition with Michaux at the second landfall, Isle de France (now Mauritius), as a result of dissatisfaction with Baudin's authoritarian manner and other concerns.

== See also ==
- List of gardener-botanist explorers of the Enlightenment
- European and American voyages of scientific exploration

== Bibliography ==
- Horner, Frank (1987). The French Reconnaissance: Baudin in Australia 1801–1803. Melbourne: Melbourne University Press. ISBN 0-522-84339-5.
