= Marie Madeleine Ly-Tio-Fane =

- Born: 22 July 1928
- Died: 21 September 2011
- Occupations: Librarian, historian

Marie Madeleine Ly-Tio-Fane (22 July 1928 – 21 September 2011) was a Mauritian librarian and historian. She wrote on the history of Mauritius and the lives of several people association with the region's economic botany including that of Pierre Poivre and Pierre Sonnerat.

Ly-Tio-Fane was born in Mauritius on 22 July 1928 and was educated at the Loreto Convent in Port Louis, and then at the University of London. She graduated in 1954 and became a librarian at the Mauritius Institute in 1956. In 1962 she joined the Mauritius Sugar Research Institute under Octave Wiehe. She built up the library of the institution and also began to work on history. In 1973 she wrote a thesis on the career of Pierre Sonnerat titled "The Career of Pierre Sonnerat, 1748-1814: A Reassessment of His Contribution to the Arts and the Natural Science." She later wrote on a history of the spice trade in Mauritius, the work of Pierre Poivre. She became a member of the Society for the Bibliography of Natural History.

She died on 21 September 2011, at the age of 83.

An obituary, including a bibliography of her publications, was published in Archives of Natural History in 2012.
