= Jean Nicolas Collignon =

French gardener

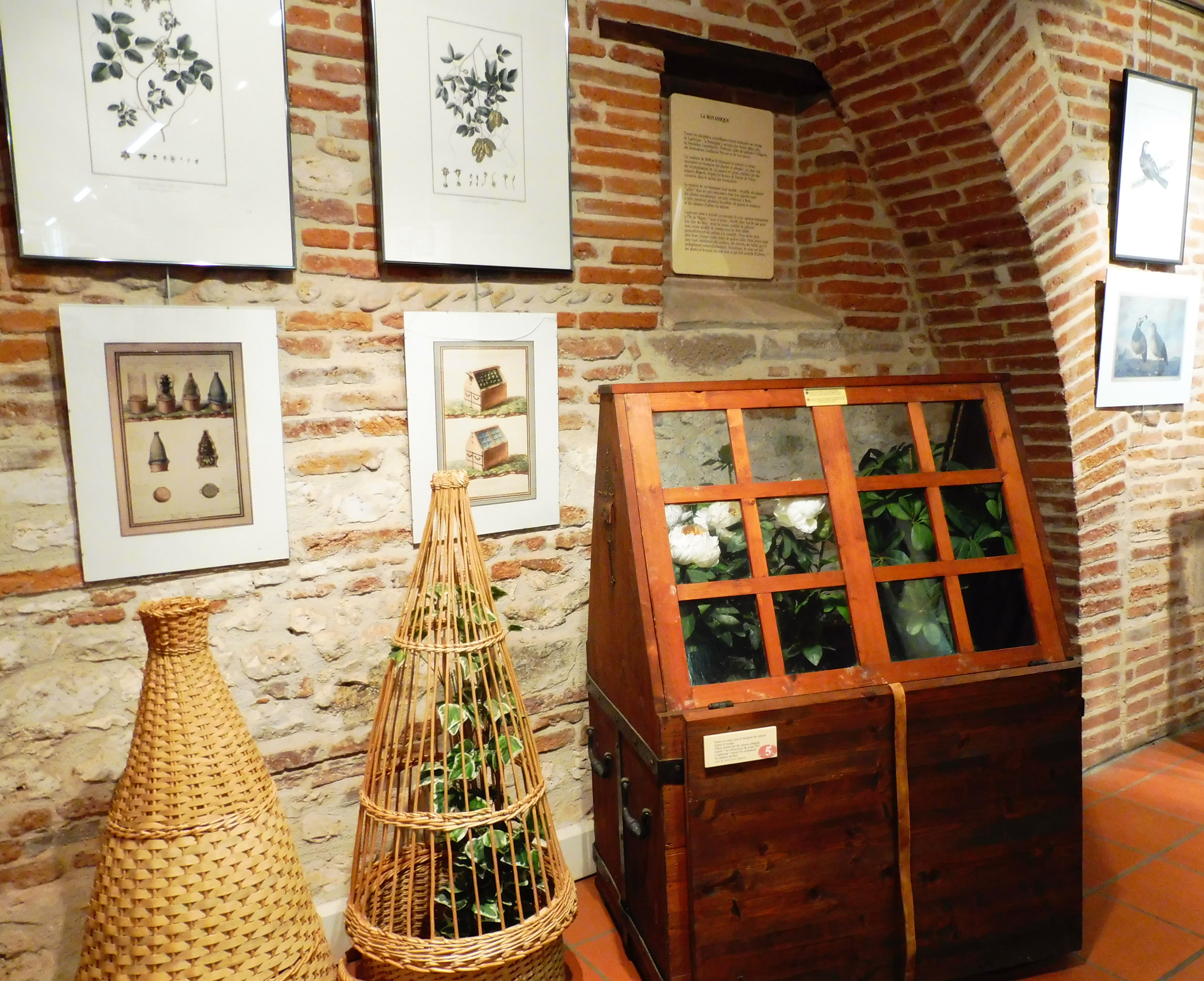

Jean Nicolas Collignon (c. 1762–?1788) was a gardener and botanist from the Jardin du Roi who served on the La Pérouse expedition to the South Seas (1785–?1788).

Following the three voyages of James Cook, French King Louis XVI had commanded a similar expedition be sent out by France. The La Pérouse expedition consisted of the frigates La Boussole, the flagship with Collignon in the crew, and L’Astrolabe under the command of Fleuriot de Langle. The two ships left Brest on the 1 August 1785 and were last seen at Botany Bay, New Holland on 26 January 1788.

Collignon was born in Metz, France in about 1762. He was recommended for the voyage by André Thouin, Director of Horticulture at the Jardin du Roi. Collignon was just 24 and had previously only worked under the direction of Thouin, who judged him as "active and intelligent". Thouin in his recommendation emphasised that Collignon should not be subordinate to the expedition's botanist, Joseph Hugues Boissieu La Martinière, and so the two were assigned to different ships. Collignon was permitted to assist the other naturalists provided this did not interfere with his principal mission.

== The expedition ==
The ships anchored at the fertile Catherine Island off the southern coast of Brazil on 6 November 1785, and after a welcome reception, Collignon took on board orange and lemon trees to join the other live plants he had gathered for the South Seas: he also took on cotton, rice, maize and other staples of the tropics.

The expedition anchored on Easter Island on 9 April 1786 and was able to land goats, ewes and pigs that had been purchased at the port of Concepcion, Chile. After viewing native plantations of yams and sweet potatoes Collignon judged the soil suitable for planting seed and he explained to the natives that the seed would produce plants that were good to eat. They appeared to understand, indicating where they thought the plants would grow best. He planted cabbage, carrots, beets, maize and pumpkins.

On 29 May 1786 the ship anchored at Maui in the Hawaiian archipelago; knowing of Cook’s fate, the ships stayed for just 24 hours, allowing only a brief period for Collignon to plant seed. In mid September 1786, the ship landed at Monterey. The soil was very fertile and Collignon gave seed to the Spanish governor and to the local mission. He also gave them potatoes that had been gathered in Chile and were still in good condition.

Some of the plants collected at Monterey and Macao would be sent back to Thouin. The visit to Monterey marked the beginning of the botanical exploration of the Trans-Mississippi West although the true range of his collections is uncertain.

In December the ship landed in Samoan waters, where Lamartinière and Collignon botanized on several islands, the natives demanding a glass bead for every plant collected, and on one occasion threatening Lamartinière when he threatened to not pay. The ship left on 23 December 1787.

== Collecting localities ==
Collignon was gardener on ’L’Astrolabe’ sailing from Brest on 1 August 1785 via Madeira, the Canaries, Teneriffe, St Catherine, Conception Bay (Chile), Easter Island, Sandwich Islands, Alaska, California, Macao (2 Jan. 1787), Philippine Islands, Port de Marivelle (21-24 Feb.) at Cavite, Manila (28 Feb-8/9 Apr.), coast of Siberia, Kamchatka, Samoa (some crew killed on Maouna Island; Collignon wounded on 11 Dec.), Fiji, Norfolk Island (1788), Botany Bay, New Caledonia, Santa Cruz Islands (shipwrecked on the reefs of Vanikuro).

== See also ==
- List of gardener-botanist explorers of the Enlightenment
- European and American voyages of scientific exploration

== Bibliography ==
- van Steenis, Cornelis G. G. J.; van Steenis-Kruseman, Maria J. (1974). "Cyclopaedia of Collectors". Flora Malesiana. 1 (1).
- Williams, Roger L. (2003). French Botany in the Enlightenment: The Ill-fated Voyages of La Pérouse and his Rescuers. Dordrecht, Netherlands: Kluwer Academic Publishers. ISBN 1-4020-1109-1.
