= HMS Russell =

Five ships of the Royal Navy have been named HMS Russell in honour of Edward Russell, 1st Earl of Orford.

- HMS Russell (1692), an 80-gun second-rate ship of the line, rebuilt in 1735 and sunk in 1762 at Sheerness.
- HMS Russell (1764), launched in 1764, was a 74-gun third-rate ship of the line, sold in 1811.
- HMS Russell (1822), launched in 1822, was a 74-gun third-rate ship of the line, broken up in 1865.
- HMS Russell (1901), launched in 1901, was a Duncan-class battleship, sunk in 1916 by a mine off Malta
- HMS Russell (F97), launched in 1954, was a Blackwood-class or Type 14 second-rate anti-submarine frigate. Broken up in 1985.

== See also ==
- HMS Halsted (K556), a frigate in commission from 1943 to 1946, named Russell briefly during 1943 while under construction
