= Edward Riou =

Royal Navy officer

Captain Edward Riou FRS
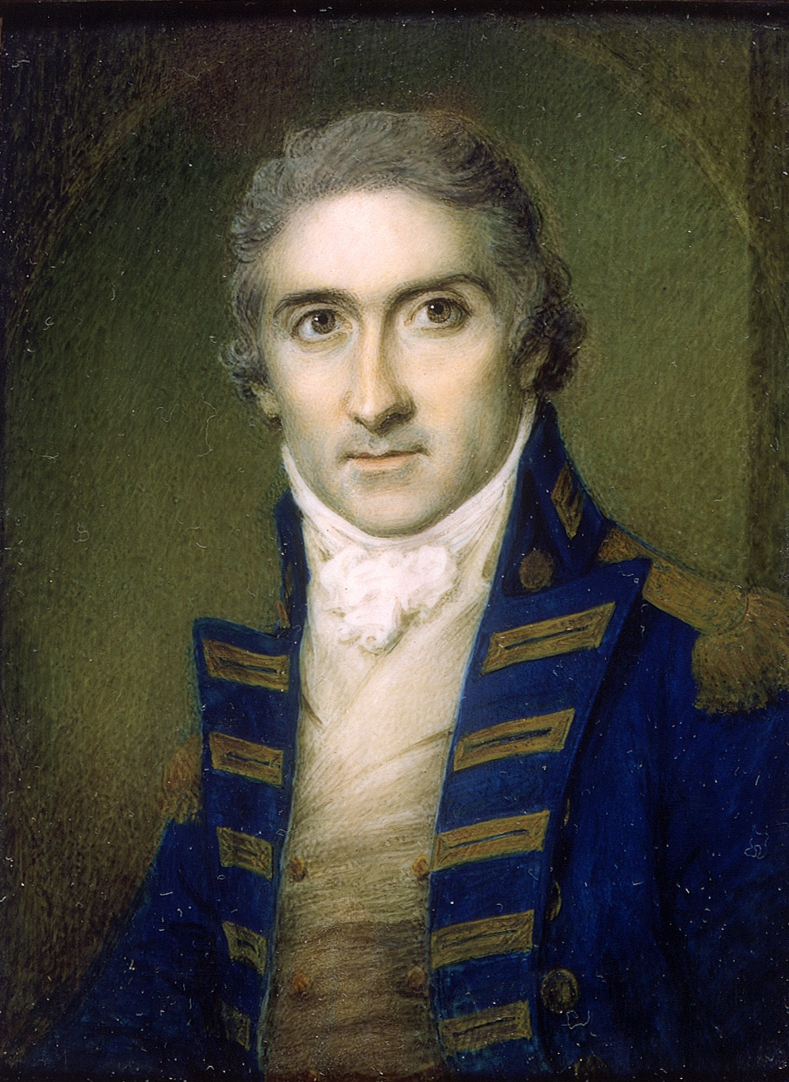
- Portrait by Samuel Shelley, c. 1800
- Born: 20 November 1762; Mount Ephraim, Kent
- Died: 2 April 1801 (aged 38); Aboard HMS Amazon, Copenhagen Harbour
- Military career
- Allegiance: Great Britain; United Kingdom
- Branch: Royal Navy
- Service years: 1774–1801
- Rank: Captain
- Commands: HMS Guardian; HMS Rose; HMS Beaulieu; HMS Princess Augusta; HMS Amazon
- Conflicts: American Revolutionary War; War of the First Coalition; Battle of Martinique; Invasion of Guadeloupe; War of the Second Coalition; Battle of Copenhagen †

Captain Edward Riou FRS (20 November 1762 – 2 April 1801) was a Royal Navy officer who served in the French Revolutionary Wars under several of the most distinguished naval officers of his age and won fame and honour for two incidents in particular.

Riou entered the navy at 12 years of age, and after a period spent in British and North American waters, served as a midshipman on Captain James Cook's third and final voyage of discovery. Prior to this voyage he had his portrait painted by popular artist Daniel Gardner. Rising through the ranks, he saw service on a number of the navy's stations, but also endured periods of unemployment. He received his first command in 1789, the former fifth-rate HMS Guardian, which was being used to transport stores and convicts to Australia. He had the misfortune to run his ship onto an iceberg, which nearly caused his ship to sink outright. After several attempts to stop the flooding into the damaged hull, most of the crew abandoned ship. Despite fully anticipating his death, Riou refused to leave his ship, and he and a few others were left to attempt the nearly impossible task of navigating the sinking ship several hundred leagues to land. After nine weeks at sea, and with continued labour and endurance, Riou successfully navigated his half-sunk ship back to port, saving the lives of those who had elected to remain with him.

His feat earned him promotions and finally commands, but a period of ill-health forced his temporary retirement from active service. Recovering quickly, he was given command of the new 38-gun HMS Amazon, and was assigned in 1801 to Sir Hyde Parker's expedition to the Baltic. Riou worked closely with Vice-Admiral Horatio Nelson during the approach to the Battle of Copenhagen, earning Nelson's trust and admiration. Nelson appointed Riou to command his frigate squadron during the battle, but when the engagement began badly for the British, Riou used his initiative to attack the Danish forts, despite being heavily outgunned. When Parker sent the signal to withdraw, Nelson ignored it and Riou felt he had no choice but to obey his commanding officer, despite his despair at what Nelson would think of retreat. As the Amazon swung away, she exposed her vulnerable stern to the Danish batteries. Riou was encouraging his men to the end when he was cut down by a round shot. Nelson, on learning of Riou's death, called the loss 'irreparable'. A monument was erected to his memory in St Paul's Cathedral, while a poem commemorated the loss of the 'gallant, good Riou'.

== Family and early career ==
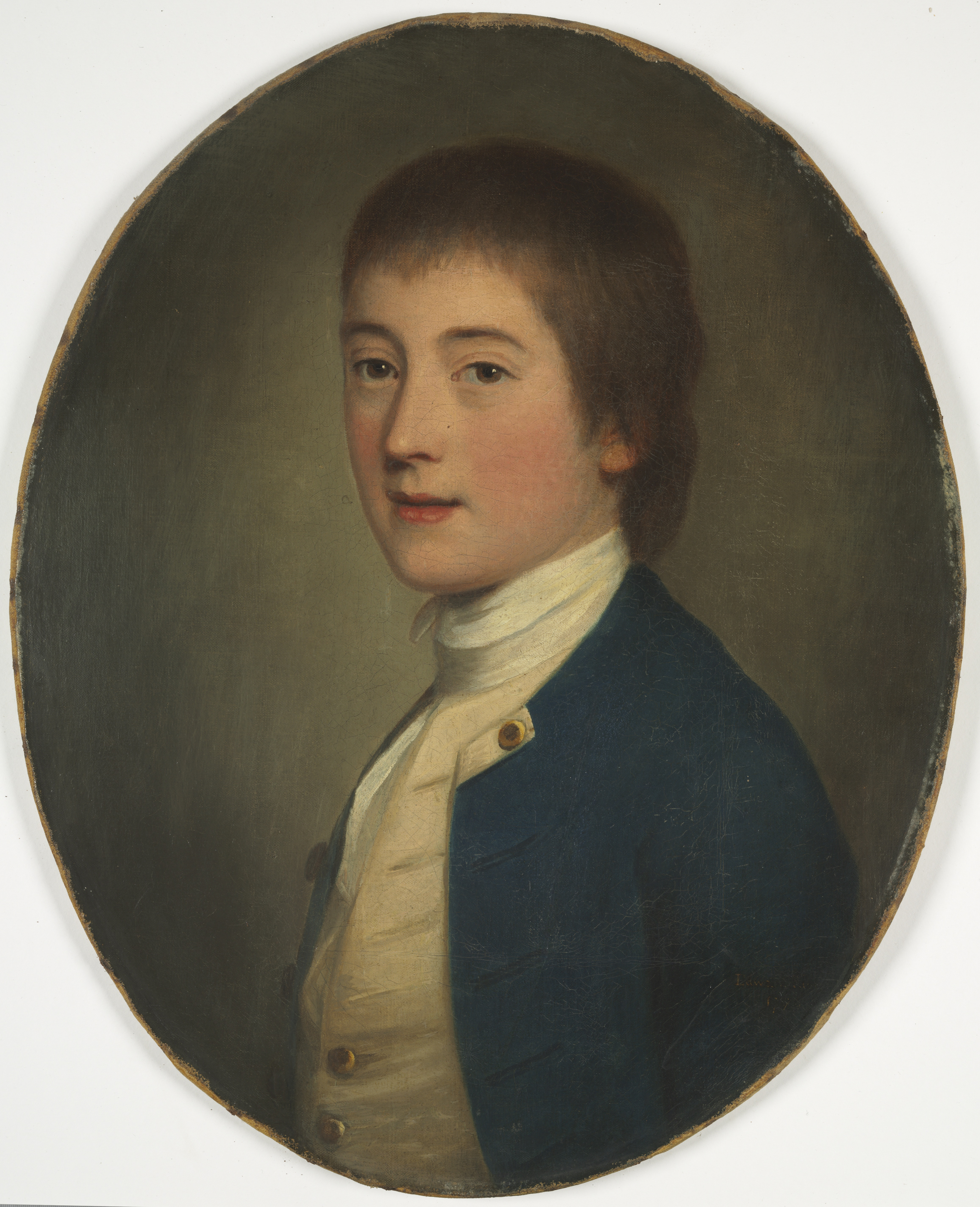
Portrait of Midshipman Edward Riou, 1776 by Daniel Gardner. Mitchell Library, State Library of New South Wales, Sydney.

Riou was born at Mount Ephraim, near Faversham, Kent, on 20 November 1762, the second son of Captain Stephen Riou of the Grenadier Guards, and his wife Dorothy. He embarked on a naval career at the age of 12, joining Sir Thomas Pye's flagship, the 90-gun HMS Barfleur at Portsmouth. His next ship was the 50-gun HMS Romney, flagship of Vice-Admiral John Montagu on the Newfoundland station. Riou was rated midshipman by 1776 and joined Captain Charles Clerke's HMS Discovery for a voyage to the Pacific under Captain James Cook aboard HMS Resolution. The expedition was Cook's third voyage of discovery, and after his death at Hawaii Clerke took command, transferring to Resolution and bringing Midshipman Riou with him.

Riou took and passed his lieutenant's examination on 19 October 1780, shortly after the expedition's return to Britain, and received his promotion on 28 October. His first appointment as lieutenant was to the 14-gun brig-sloop HMS Scourge, which was sent to serve in the West Indies. Here Riou appears to have become ill, a common experience for naval officers serving in the tropics, but he survived to return to Britain and was discharged from his ship on 3 February 1782 and went into the Royal Naval Hospital at Haslar. He recovered his health and by April 1783 was back on active service, joining the Portsmouth guardship HMS Ganges. Discharging from the Ganges in June 1784, he went on to half-pay, which lasted for two years until he received another appointment, this time to the 50-gun HMS Salisbury in March 1786. The Salisbury was the flagship of Rear-Admiral John Elliot, who sailed to Newfoundland take up his post as Commodore-Governor there. During this period in his life, Riou was described by a seaman aboard the Ganges as 'a strict disciplinarian with a fanatical regard for cleanliness'. He was also noted to be a religious man, and an affectionate son and brother. A further period on half-pay followed his discharge from the Salisbury in November 1788, but meanwhile he had succeeded in attracting the attention of the Townsend family, and was able to use their patronage to secure an appointment to command HMS Guardian, in April 1789.

== Command of the Guardian ==
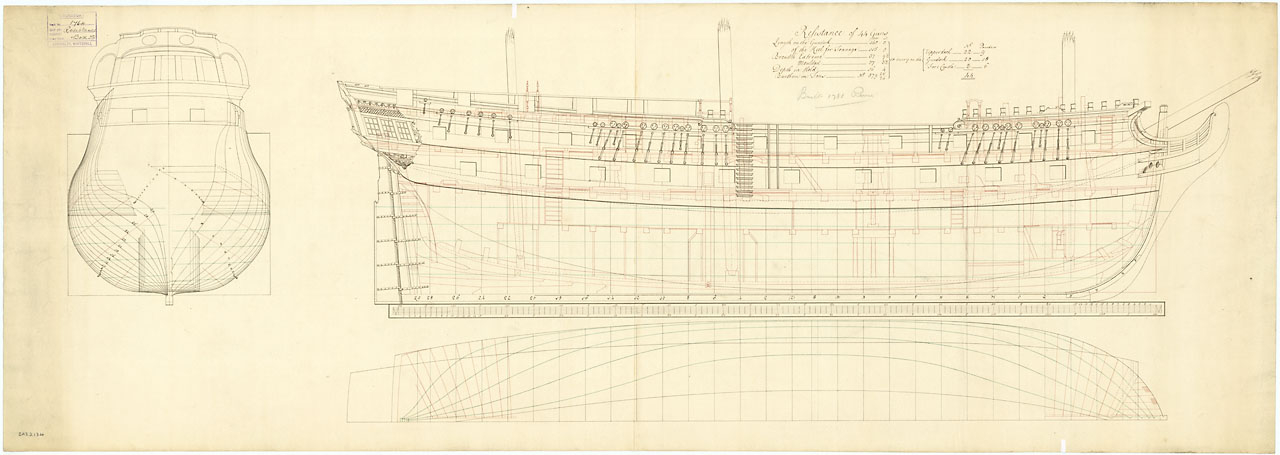
Plan of HMS Resistance, a sister ship of HMS Guardian. Resistance was ordered the same year and was laid down two months before HMS Guardian

The Guardian was a former two-decked 44-gun fifth-rate, but had been armed en flûte and loaded with stores to be taken to the British colony at Botany Bay. In addition to these stores, consisting of seeds, plants, farm machinery and livestock with a total value of some £70,000, the Guardian was also to transport a number of convicts and their overseers. Aboard the Guardian was a young midshipman named Thomas Pitt, the son of politician Thomas Pitt, and nephew of Prime Minister William Pitt.

With over 300 people aboard his ship, Riou left Spithead on 8 September 1789, and had an uneventful voyage to the Cape of Good Hope where he loaded more livestock and plants. While at the Cape, Riou met Lieutenant William Bligh, who had sailed with Riou on Cook's third voyage during which Bligh had been the sailing master of Resolution. Bligh had arrived at the Cape from Timor, where he had landed after a 3,618 mile voyage in an open boat following a mutiny aboard his ship, HMS Bounty. After completing his re-provisioning, Riou sailed from the Cape in mid-December, and picking up the Westerlies, began the second leg of his voyage to New South Wales. On Christmas Eve, twelve days after his departure from the Cape, a large iceberg was spotted, and Riou decided to use the ice to replenish his stocks of fresh water that were quickly being depleted by the need to supply the plants and animals he was transporting.

=== Riou and the iceberg ===
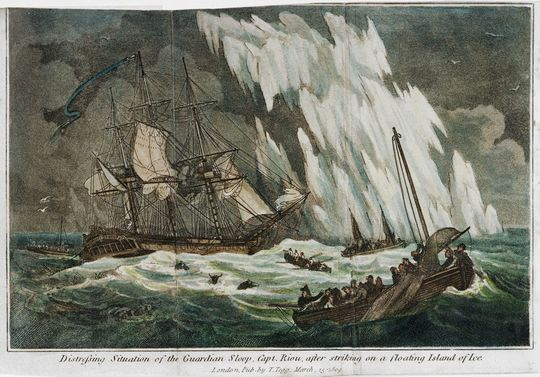
Distressing situation of the Guardian sloop, Capt. Riou, after striking on a floating Island of ice, depiction of the event printed in 1809

Riou positioned himself near the iceberg, and despatched boats to collect the ice. By the time the last boats had been recovered, night had fallen and a sudden fogbank descended, hiding the iceberg from view. Riou found himself in a dangerous situation. Somewhere to leeward lay a large mass of ice, concealed in the darkness and fog. He posted lookouts in the bows and rigging, and began to edge slowly forward. After sometime the danger seemed to be past, and the iceberg left behind, when at 9 o'clock a strange pale glow was reported by the lookout in the bows. Riou ordered the helm to turn hard a starboard, turning into the wind as a wall of ice higher than the ship's masts slid by along the side. It briefly appeared that the danger had been avoided, but as she passed by, the Guardian struck an underwater projection with a crash. Caught in a sudden gust of wind, the ship reared up and swung about, driving the stern into the ice, smashing away the rudder, shattering her stern frame and tearing a large gash in the hull. Despite the seriousness of the situation, Riou remained calm, using the sails to pull clear of the ice, and then taking stock of the damage.

Now clear of the immediate danger of the ice, Riou found himself in a desperate situation. There was two feet of water in the hold and more was rushing in, while the sea was rising and a gale had sprung up. The pumps were manned, but could not keep up with the influx of water, and by midnight there was 6 feet of water in the hold. At dawn on Christmas Day, an attempt was made to fother the hull, which involved lowering an oakum-packed studding sail over the side to cover the gash in the hull and slow the flooding. This was temporarily successful and by 11 o'clock the pumps had been able to reduce the water to a level of 19 inches. The respite was short-lived, as the sail split under the pressure of the water and the water level began to rise again. A number of seaman requested permission to take to the ship's boats. Riou convinced them to stay, but another attempt to fother the hull with another sail failed when the sail immediately ripped. By nightfall on 25 December, the water in the hold had risen to 7 feet, and the ship was rolling violently, allowing water to pour over the ship's side. Riou ordered the stores, guns and livestock to be thrown overboard in an attempt to lighten the ship, but was injured when his hand was crushed by a falling cask while trying to clear the bread-room. By morning the next day, the ship was settling by the stern, while the sails had been torn away in the gale. Again the seamen, this time joined by the convicts, requested to be allowed to take to the boats. Riou at last agreed to this, well aware that there were not enough boats for everyone, and announced 'As for me, I have determined to remain in the ship, and shall endeavour to make my presence useful as long as there is any occasion for it.'

=== 'I have determined to remain in the ship' ===
While the boats were prepared, Riou wrote a letter to the Secretary to the Admiralty;

Sir,
If any part of the officers or crew of the Guardian should ever survive to get home, I have only to say their conduct after the fatal stroke against an island of ice was admirable and wonderful in everything that related to their duties considered either as private men or on his Majesty's Service.
As there seems no possibility of my remaining many hours in this world, I beg leave to recommend to the consideration of the Admiralty a sister who if my conduct or service should be found deserving any memory their favour might be shown to her together with a widowed mother.
I am Sir remaining with great respect
Your ever Obedt & humble servt,
E. Riou

Riou gave the note to Mr Clements, the master of the Guardian, who was given command of the launch. A total of 259 people chose to join the five boats, leaving Riou with sixty-two people; himself, three midshipmen, including Thomas Pitt, the surgeon's mate, the boatswain, carpenter, three superintendents of convicts, a daughter of one of the superintendents, thirty seamen and boys and twenty-one convicts. The Guardian was nearly awash by now with 16 feet of water in the hold, but a bumping noise on the deck attracted attention, and on investigation was found to be a number of casks that had broken free and were floating in the hold, trapped under the lower gundeck. Realising that this was providing extra buoyancy, Riou had the gun deck hatches sealed and caulked, while another sail was sent under the hull to control the flooding. Having now created a substitute hull out of his deck, Riou raised what little sail he could and began the long journey back to land, with the pumps being continuously manned.

For nine weeks Riou and his small crew navigated the Guardian, by now little more than a raft, across the 400 leagues to the Cape of Good Hope. The Cape of Good Hope was sighted on 21 February 1790, and whalers were despatched from Table Bay to help the battered ship to safety. Riou ran her aground to prevent her sinking, but a gale struck the coast shortly afterwards, completing the wreck of the Guardian. The voyage was described by J. K. Laughton in the Dictionary of National Biography as 'almost without parallel'. Those who remained with the Guardian were among the few survivors of the accident. Of the boats sent out on 25 December, only the launch with 15 people survived, having been rescued by a French merchant. The launch had witnessed the sinking of the jolly-boat, before losing contact with the two cutters and the long-boat. Riou arranged for the surviving convicts who had helped to save the ship to be pardoned for their good service.

== Promotion and early service in the French Revolutionary Wars ==
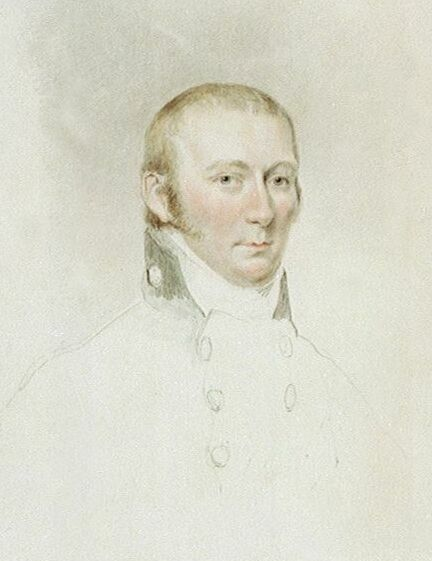
Captain Edward Riou, unifinished watercolour, by John Jackson

Riou returned to Britain and was met with popular acclaim for his feat. Acquitted of any blame for the loss of his ship, he was promoted to master and commander on 21 September 1790, and advanced to post-captain on 4 June 1791. These promotions were for rank only, and he did not receive a command until after the outbreak of the French Revolutionary Wars. Appointed to command the sixth-rate HMS Rose in June 1793, he served in the West Indies with Sir John Jervis and was active in the operations against Guadeloupe and Martinique in 1794. He was moved to the 40-gun HMS Beaulieu in November 1794, capturing a number of small French vessels before ill-health forced him to be invalided home. In the meantime, he was appointed to the yacht HMS Princess Augusta, but his health improved and he was able to return to active service in June 1799 with an appointment to command the 38-gun HMS Amazon. He was active against French privateers, before being assigned to Sir Hyde Parker's expedition to the Baltic in 1801 to compel the Danes to abandon the League of Armed Neutrality.

In May 1796 he was elected a Fellow of the Royal Society

== Battle of Copenhagen ==
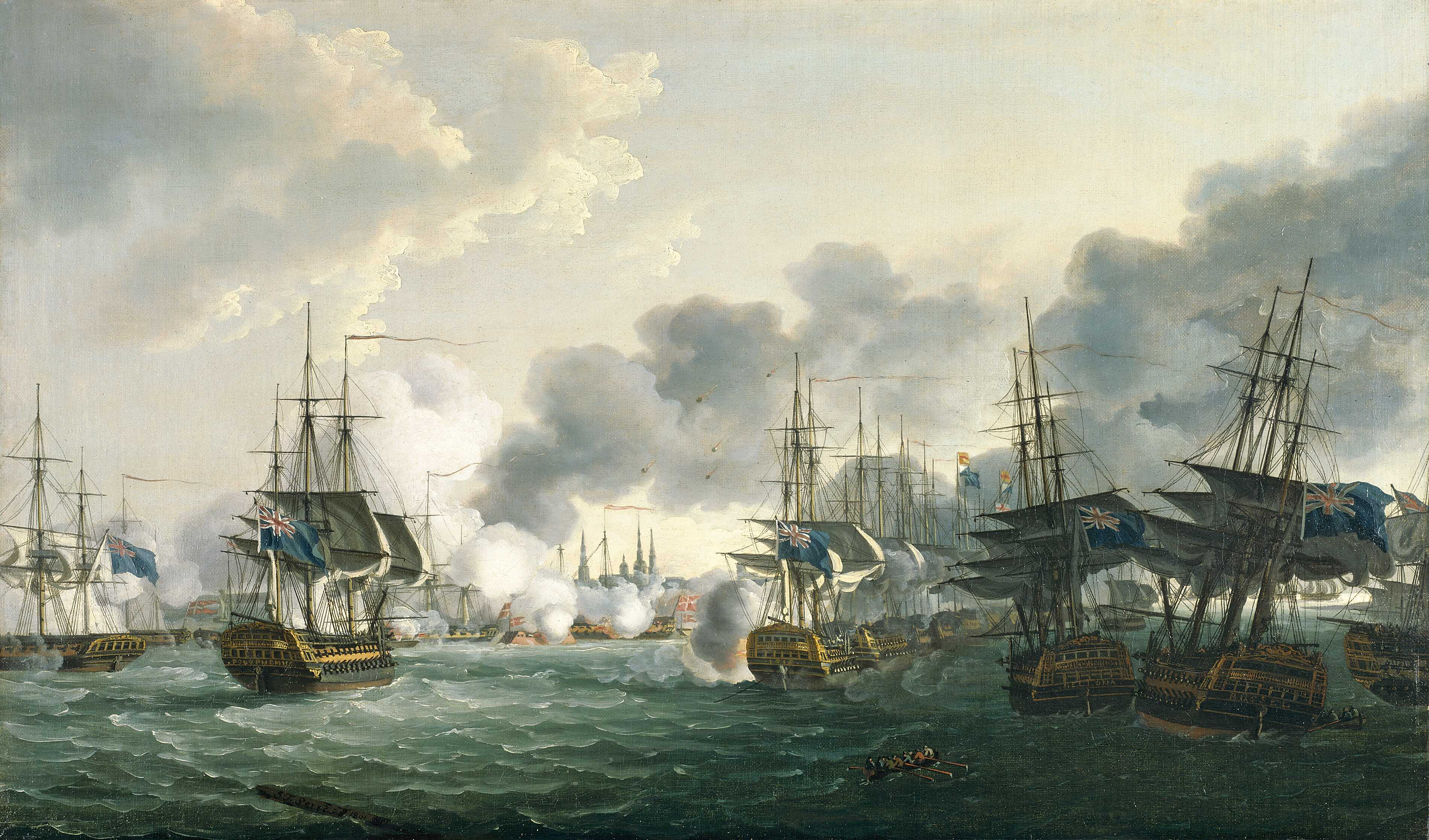
The British fleet flying the blue ensign during the 1801 Battle of Copenhagen, the Royal Navy ships HMS Russell and HMS Bellona running aground in the right foreground.

After the British force had surveyed the Danish positions around Copenhagen, a council of war was held between Parker, his second in command Vice-Admiral Horatio Nelson, and the other British captains. Riou was among those present. Riou had worked closely with Nelson and Captain Thomas Foley in the lead up to the attack, and Nelson duly appointed him commander of the frigates and smaller vessels, with the instruction to deploy his ships to support the main fleet. As the battle began, several of Nelson's ships ran aground on shoals in the harbour, and a new plan of attack had to be improvised. As Nelson's ships of the line engaged their Danish counterparts, Riou took his frigates in to harass the Tre Kroner forts and blockships. Despite being heavily outmatched and dangerously exposed, they exchanged fire for several hours. The ships suffered heavy casualties; Riou was hit on the head by a splinter.

=== Death ===
At 1:15 pm, Parker, waiting outside the harbour with the reserve, raised a signal ordering Nelson to withdraw. Nelson acknowledged the signal but ignored it, while Nelson's second in command, Rear-Admiral Thomas Graves repeated the signal but did not obey it. Riou now found himself in a difficult position. Too junior an officer to risk disobeying a direct order, he reluctantly gave the order for his small squadron to withdraw. In doing so his ships were forced to turn their sterns to the Danish guns, leaving themselves open to heavy fire on their most vulnerable area. The withdrawal of HMS Alcmene and then HMS Blanche reduced the thick cloud of gun smoke that was helping to obscure the British ships, leaving the Amazon exposed to the full force of the Danish guns. Riou remained in action for a further half an hour before reluctantly giving the order to withdraw. Lieutenant-Colonel William Stuart, commanding the soldiers of the 48th Regiment recorded that Riou:

...was sitting on a gun, was encouraging his men, and had been wounded in the head by a splinter. He had expressed himself grieved at being thus obliged to retreat, and nobly observed, 'What will Nelson think of us?' His clerk was killed by his side; and by another shot, several marines, while hauling on the main-brace, shared the same fate. Riou then exclaimed, 'Come, then, my boys, let us all die together!' The words were scarcely uttered, when the fatal shot severed him in two.

Command of the Amazon devolved to her first lieutenant, Lieutenant John Quilliam, who completed the withdrawal.

== Memorials ==
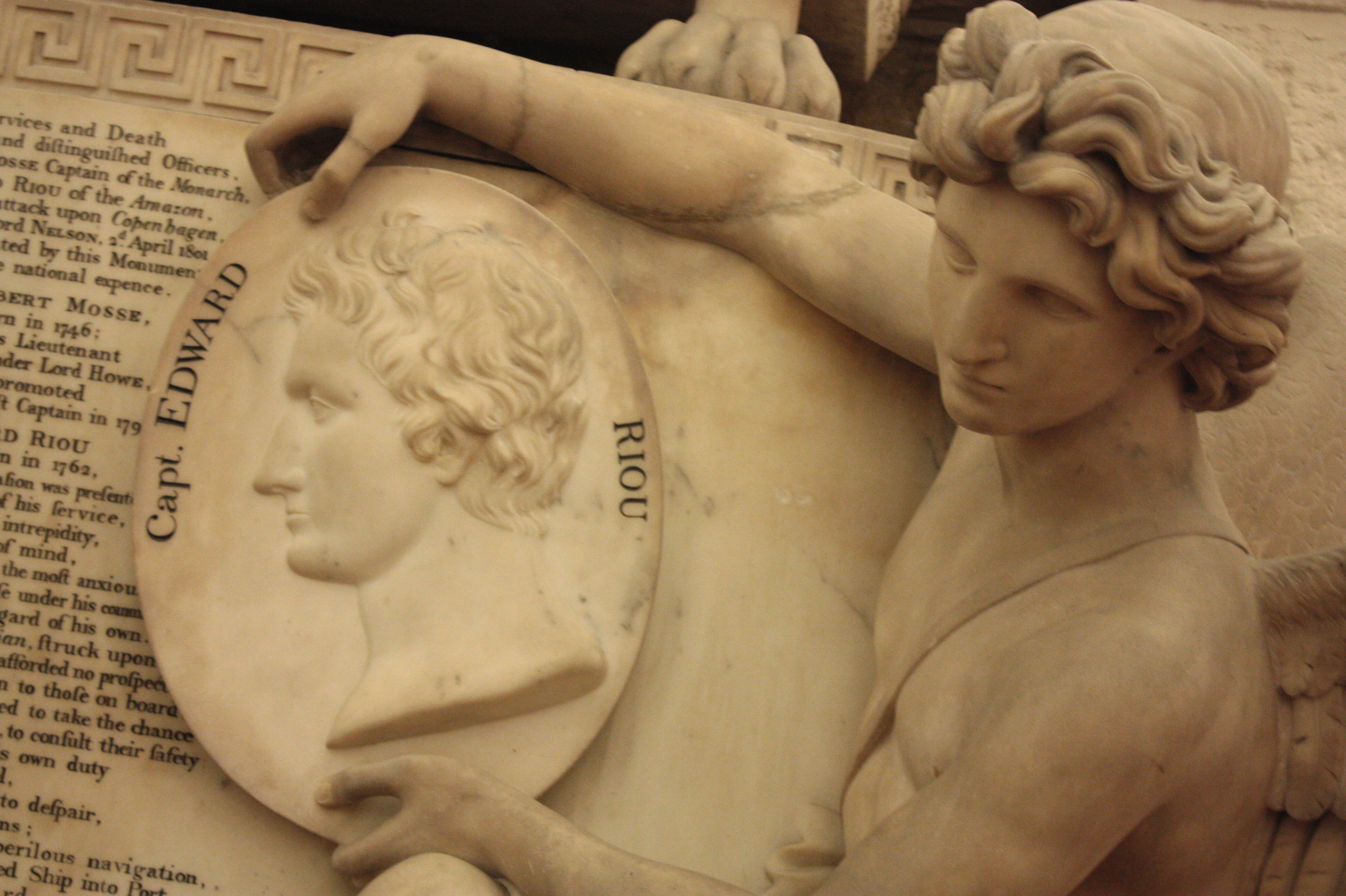
The monument to Edward Riou in St Paul's Cathedral (detail)

Nelson, who had not known him before this expedition, had conceived a great affection for Riou, and wrote 'In poor dear Riou the country has sustained an irreparable loss.' British naval historian Edward Pelham Brenton declared that he had all the qualities of a perfect officer.

Parliament commemorated his memory with a joint memorial (shared with Cpt. James Robert Mosse) in the crypt of St Paul's Cathedral. The poet Thomas Campbell wrote The Battle of the Baltic, with the lines

Brave hearts! To Britain's pride,
Once so faithful and so true,
On the deck of fame that died
With the gallant, good Riou

— Thomas Campbell, The Battle of the Baltic
