= Antoine Sautier =

Antoine Sautier (died 1801) was a student gardener who was invited to join the Baudin scientific expedition (1800–1804) in the corvettes Géographe and Naturaliste to chart the coast of New Holland (Australia), make scientific observations and collect natural history specimens. This was the grandest such voyage of its kind in the early nineteenth century with a team of 22 savants (scientists, artists and engineers). He was a member of a team of 5 gardeners that served on this voyage, the others being Antoine Guichenot, François Cagnet, and Merlot all under the supervision of Head Gardener Anselme Riedlé.

== Life ==
Little is known of his early life. He died and was buried at sea on 15 November 1801 on the leg of the voyage between Timor (visited from 21 August to 12 November 1801) and New Holland.

== Collections ==
Collections were made in the Canary Islands; Mauritius; Australia (Western Australia). His herbarium collections are held in herbaria in Paris, the British Museum and Kew (BM, G-DC, G-DEL, H, K, L, MO, NY, P, PC). A manuscript journal he maintained for the voyage is stored in the National Library of the Natural History Museum in Paris.

== Honours ==
Commemorated in the genus Sautiera Decne.

== See also ==
- List of gardener-botanist explorers of the Enlightenment
- European and American voyages of scientific exploration

== Bibliography ==
- Brosse, Jacques (1983). Great Voyages of Exploration. The Golden Age of Discovery in the Pacific. Transl. Stanley Hochman. Sydney: Doubleday. ISBN 0-86824-182-2.
- Decaisne, Joseph (1834). "Herbarii timorensis description". Nouv. Ann. Mus. Hist. Nat. Paris. 3: 333–501. Repr. Paris 1835.
- van Steenis, Cornelis Gijsbert Gerrit Jan; van Steenis-Kruseman, Maria Johanna (1974). "Cyclopaedia of Collectors". Flora Malesiana. 1 (1): 464.
