= Antoine Guichenot =

French Assistant Gardener

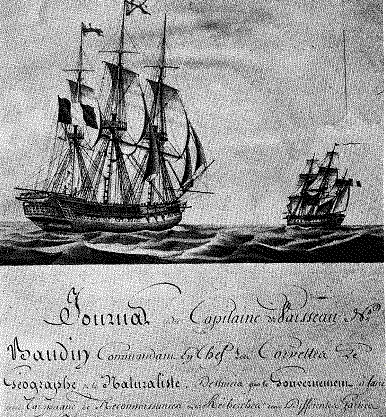
Le Géographe and Le Naturaliste

Antoine Guichenot or Guichenault (1783–1867) was "gardener's boy" on the 1801—1804 French scientific voyage to Australia under Nicolas Baudin, and the 1817 voyage under Louis de Freycinet. Very little is known about him, but the records of Baudin's voyage, together with annotations on surviving plant specimens collected by him, suggest that he was poorly educated, with atrocious spelling and little knowledge of botany, yet worked extremely hard, collecting more plant specimens than the officially appointed botanist, Jean Baptiste Leschenault de la Tour, and, despite his poor literacy, labelling them with much more useful annotations. There were five gardeners altogether on the Baudin voyage, the others being Antoine Sautier, François Cagnet and Merlot, all under the supervision of Head Gardener Anselme Riedlé.

His contributions to Australian botany are commemorated in the name of the Australian plant genus Guichenotia. Guichenault Point, a promontory on Peron Peninsula in Shark Bay, was named after him. Guichenot is the more commonly used spelling of his name, and widely adopted by botanists; but Guichenault is used in François Péron's journal of the Baudin expedition, and hence for the place named after him.

== See also ==
- List of gardener-botanist explorers of the Enlightenment
- European and American voyages of scientific exploration

== Bibliography ==
- Horner, Frank (1987). The French Reconnaissance: Baudin in Australia 1801–1803. Melbourne: Melbourne University Press. ISBN 0-522-84339-5.
