= Anselme Riedlé =

French horticulturist (1765–1801)

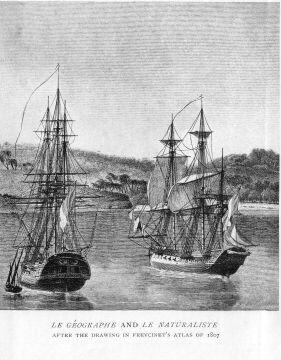
Corvettes Géographe and Naturaliste as illustrated in Freycinet's journal

Anselme Riedlé (1765–1801) was gardener at the Jardin des Plantes who was invited to join the Nicolas Baudin scientific expedition (1800–1804) in the corvettes Géographe and Naturaliste to chart the coast of New Holland (Australia), make scientific observations and collect natural history specimens. This was possibly the largest such voyage of its kind in the early nineteenth century, with a team of 22 savants (scientists, artists and engineers). He was Head Gardener to a team of 5 gardeners that served on the voyage, the others being Antoine Sautier, Cagnet, Merlot (listed as 'an African'), and Antoine Guichenot. Riedlé had accompanied Baudin on a previous expedition where Riedlé had collected plants in the West Indies (U.S. Virgin Islands and Puerto Rico).

== Life ==
Riedlé was born in Irsee, Schwaben, Germany in 1765. He died in Timor on 21 October 1801 where he was collecting specimens in the region of Kupang. Baudin also died later on the same expedition.

== Collections ==
His collecting localities were Indonesia (Nusa Tenggara Timur); Canary Islands; Mauritius; Australia (Western Australia); Puerto Rico, Trinidad and Tobago, Virgin Islands (USA). His plant collections are held in herbaria in Paris, Geneva, the British Museum, Kew and Berlin and wood samples he collected with Guichenot are stored in Paris. Herbaria B, BM, FI, FI-W, G?, G-DC, G-DEL, H, K, L, MO, MPU, NY, P, PC, P-JU. A manuscript journal he maintained for part of the voyage is stored at the Natural History Museum in Paris.

== Honours ==
Commemorated in the names Riedleia A.P.DC. and Riedléja Hassk. Riedle Bay in Maria Island, Tasmania, commemorates his visit there with the Baudin expedition in 1802.

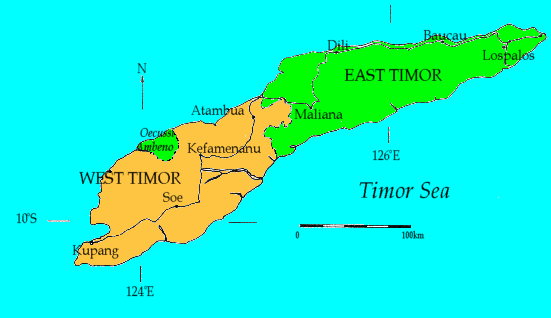
Map showing Kupang, capital of present-day West Timor where Anselme Riedlé died

== See also ==
- List of gardener-botanist explorers of the Enlightenment
- European and American voyages of scientific exploration

== Bibliography ==
- Brosse, Jacques (1983). Great Voyages of Exploration. The Golden Age of Discovery in the Pacific. Transl. Stanley Hochman. Sydney: Doubleday. ISBN 0-86824-182-2.
- van Steenis, Cornelis Gijsbert Gerrit Jan; van Steenis-Kruseman, Maria Johanna (1974). "Cyclopaedia of Collectors". Flora Malesiana. 1 (1): 464.
