= HMS Guardian (1784) =

British Royal Navy two-decker

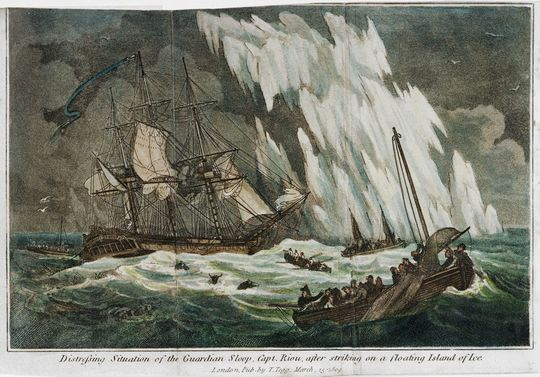
- Distressing situation of the Guardian sloop, Capt. Riou, after striking on a floating Island of ice

History

Great Britain
- Name: HMS Guardian
- Ordered: 11 August 1780
- Builder: Robert Batson, Limehouse
- Laid down: December 1780
- Launched: 23 March 1784
- Completed: By 20 May 1784
- Fate: Struck an iceberg on 24 December 1789; Destroyed by hurricane on 12 April 1790; Remains sold on 8 February 1791

General characteristics
- Class & type: 44-gun Roebuck-class two-decker fifth rate
- Tons burthen: 896 33/94 bm
- Length: 140 ft (42.7 m) (overall); 115 ft 6 in (35.2 m) (keel)
- Beam: 38 ft 2.5 in (11.6 m)
- Depth of hold: 16 ft 4 in (4.98 m)
- Propulsion: Sails
- Sail plan: Full-rigged ship
- Complement: 300
- Armament: Upper deck: 22 × 9 pdrs; Lower deck: 20 × 18-pdrs; Forecastle: 2 × 6 pdrs

HMS Guardian was a 44-gun Roebuck-class fifth-rate two-decker of the Royal Navy, later converted to carry stores. She was completed too late to take part in the American War of Independence, and instead spent several years laid up in ordinary, before finally entering service as a store and convict transport to Australia, under Lieutenant Edward Riou. In 1789 Riou sailed Guardian, loaded with provisions, animals, convicts and their overseers, to the Cape of Good Hope, where he took on more supplies. Nearly two weeks after his departure on the second leg of the journey, an iceberg was sighted and Riou sent boats to collect ice to replenish his water supplies. Before he could complete the re-provisioning, a sudden change in the weather obscured the iceberg, and Guardian collided with it while trying to pull away. She was badly damaged and in immediate danger of sinking. The crew made frantic repair attempts but to no apparent avail. Riou eventually allowed most of the crew to take to Guardian's boats, but refused to leave his ship. Eventually through continuous work he and the remaining crew were able to navigate the ship, by now reduced to little more than a raft, back to the Cape, a nine-week voyage described as "almost unparalleled". Riou ran Guardian aground to prevent her sinking, but shortly afterwards a hurricane struck the coast, wrecking her. The remains were sold in 1791.

== Construction and commissioning ==
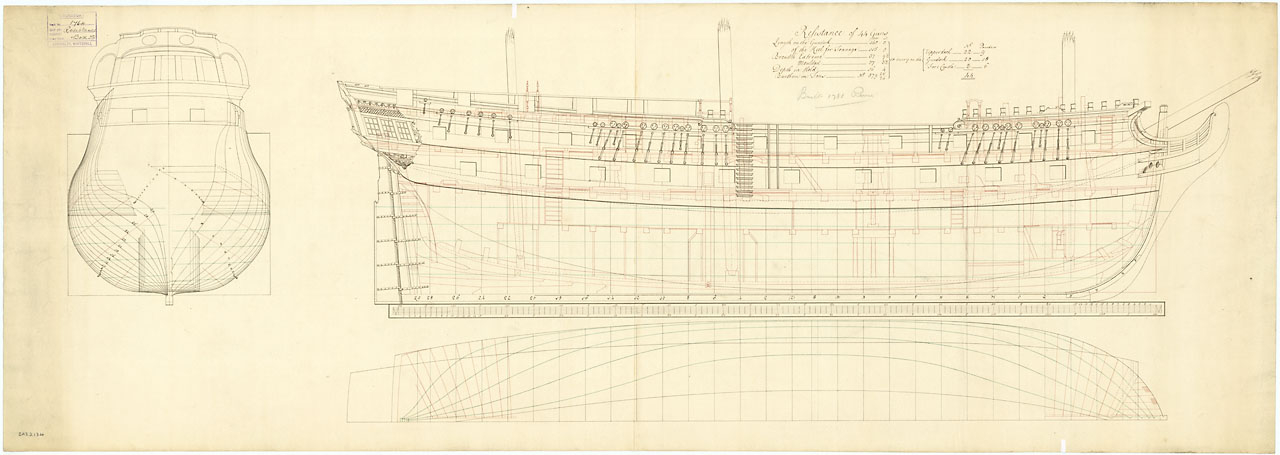
Plan of HMS Resistance, a sister ship of HMS Guardian. Resistance was ordered the same year and was laid down two months before HMS Guardian.

She was ordered from Robert Batson, Limehouse on 11 August 1780 and was laid down in December that year. Guardian was launched on 23 March 1784, too late to see service in the American War of Independence and was instead fitted out at Deptford Dockyard for ordinary. The builder was paid £12,322.65 (equivalent to £1,517,110 in 2023) for her construction, with the Admiralty paying another £4,420 (equivalent to £544,171 in 2023) to fit her out. After five years spent laid up she was fitted out at Woolwich in 1789 to serve as a store and convict transport, commissioning under Lieutenant Edward Riou in April.

== Voyage to Australia ==
Riou was tasked with delivering the stores consisting of seeds, plants, farm machinery and livestock, with a total value of some £70,000 (equivalent to about £8,850,000 in 2023), and convicts to the British settlement at Botany Bay. At least some of the plants and seeds were provided by Hugh Ronalds, a nurseryman in Brentford. Also aboard Guardian was a young midshipman named Thomas Pitt, the son of politician Thomas Pitt, and nephew of Prime Minister William Pitt.

With over 300 people aboard his ship, Riou left Spithead on 8 September, and had an uneventful voyage to the Cape of Good Hope, where he arrived on 24 November and loaded more livestock and plants. After completing his re-provisioning Riou sailed from the Cape in mid-December, and picking up the westerlies began the second leg of his voyage to New South Wales. On 24 December, twelve days and 1,300 statute miles (2100 km) after his departure from the Cape, a large iceberg was spotted at 44°S 41°E, and Riou decided to use the ice to replenish his stocks of fresh water, that were quickly being depleted by the need to supply the plants and animals he was transporting.

=== Riou and the iceberg ===
Riou positioned himself near the iceberg, and despatched boats to collect the ice. By the time the last boats had been recovered night had fallen, when a sudden fogbank descended, hiding the iceberg from view. Riou found himself in a dangerous situation. Somewhere to leeward lay a large mass of ice, concealed in the darkness and fog. He posted lookouts in the bows and rigging, and began to edge slowly forward. After some time the danger seemed to be past, and the iceberg left behind, when at 9 o'clock a strange pale glow was reported by the lookout in the bows. Riou ordered the helm to turn hard a starboard, turning into the wind as a wall of ice higher than the ship's masts slid by along the side. It briefly appeared that the danger had been avoided, but as she passed by, Guardian struck an underwater projection with a sudden crash. Caught in a sudden gust of wind, the ship reared up and swung about, driving the stern into the ice, smashing away the rudder, shattering her stern frame and tearing a large gash in the hull. Despite the seriousness of the situation, Riou remained calm, using the sails to pull clear of the ice, and then taking stock of the damage.

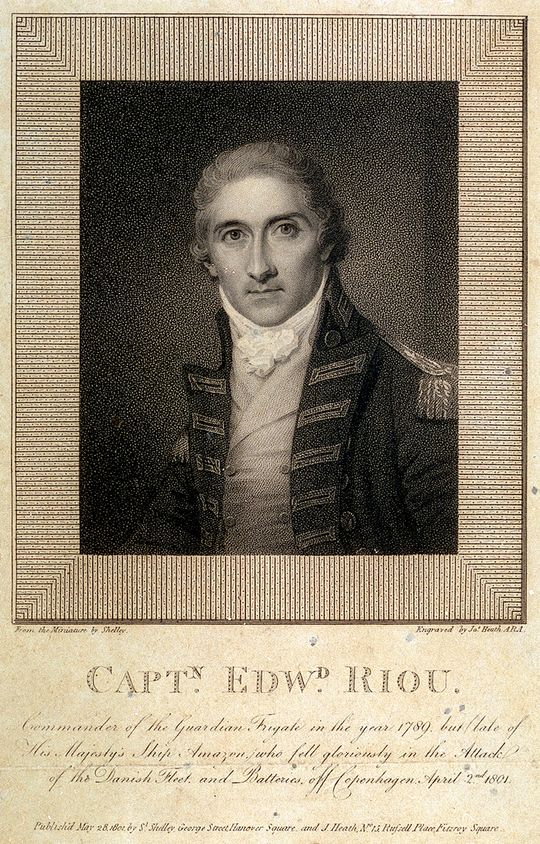
Engraving made in 1801 after Riou's death during the Battle of Copenhagen; "Captn Edwd Riou Commander of the Guardian Frigate in the year 1789 but late of His Majesty's ship Amazon who fell gloriously in the Attack of the Danish Fleet and Batteries off Copenhagen 2 April 1801"

Now clear of the immediate danger of the ice, Riou found himself in a desperate situation. There was two feet (0.61 m) of water in the hold and more was rushing in, while the sea was rising and a gale had sprung up. The pumps were manned, but could not keep up with the ingress of water, and by midnight there was six feet (1.8 m) of water in the hold. At dawn on 25 December, an attempt was made to fother the hull by lowering an oakum-packed studding sail over the side to cover the gash in the hull and slow the flooding. This was temporarily successful and by 11 o'clock the pumps had been able to reduce the water to a level of 19 inches (480 mm). The respite was short-lived, when the sail split under the pressure of the water and the water level began to rise again. At this a number of seaman requested permission to take to the ship's boats.

By nightfall on 25 December, the water in the hold had risen to seven feet (2.1 m), and the ship was rolling violently, allowing water to pour over the ship's side. Riou ordered the stores, guns and livestock to be thrown overboard in an attempt to lighten the ship, but was injured when his hand was crushed by a falling cask while trying to clear the bread-room. By morning the next day the ship was settling by the stern, while the sails had been torn away in the gale. Again the seamen, this time joined by the convicts, requested to be allowed to take to the boats. Riou at last agreed to this, well aware that there were not enough boats for everyone, and announced "As for me, I have determined to remain in the ship, and shall endeavour to make my presence useful as long as there is any occasion for it."

=== "I have determined to remain in the ship" ===
While the boats were prepared, Riou wrote a letter to the Secretary to the Admiralty;

Sir,
If any part of the officers or crew of the Guardian should ever survive to get home, I have only to say their conduct after the fatal stroke against an island of ice was admirable and wonderful in everything that related to their duties considered either as private men or on his Majesty's Service.
As there seems no possibility of my remaining many hours in this world, I beg leave to recommend to the consideration of the Admiralty a sister who if my conduct or service should be found deserving any memory their favour might be shown to her together with a widowed mother.
I am Sir remaining with great respect
Your ever Obedt & humble servt,
E. Riou

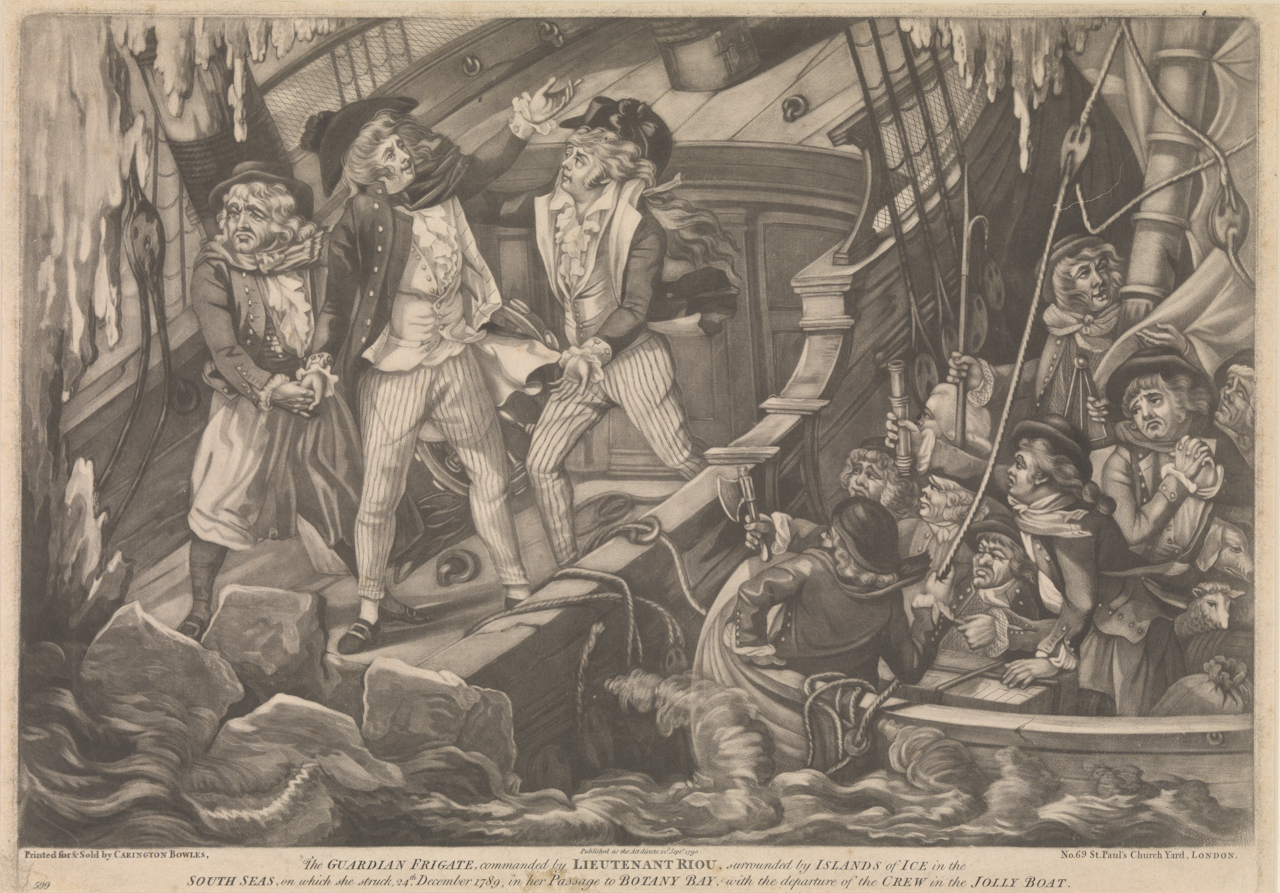
The Guardian frigate, commanded by Lieutenant Riou, surrounded by Islands of Ice in the South Seas.

Riou gave the note to Mr Clements, the master of Guardian, who was given command of the launch. A total of 259 people chose to join the five boats, leaving Riou with sixty-two people: himself, three midshipmen, including Thomas Pitt, the surgeon's mate, the boatswain, carpenter, three superintendents of convicts, a daughter of one of the superintendents, thirty seamen and boys and twenty-one convicts. Guardian was nearly awash by now with 16 feet (4.9 m) of water in the hold, but a bumping noise on the deck attracted attention, and on investigation was found to be a number of casks that had broken free and were floating in the hold, trapped under the lower gun deck. Realising that this was providing extra buoyancy, Riou had the gun deck hatches sealed and caulked, while another sail was sent under the hull to control the flooding. Having now created a substitute hull out of his deck, Riou raised what little sail he could and began the long journey back to land, with the pumps being continuously manned.

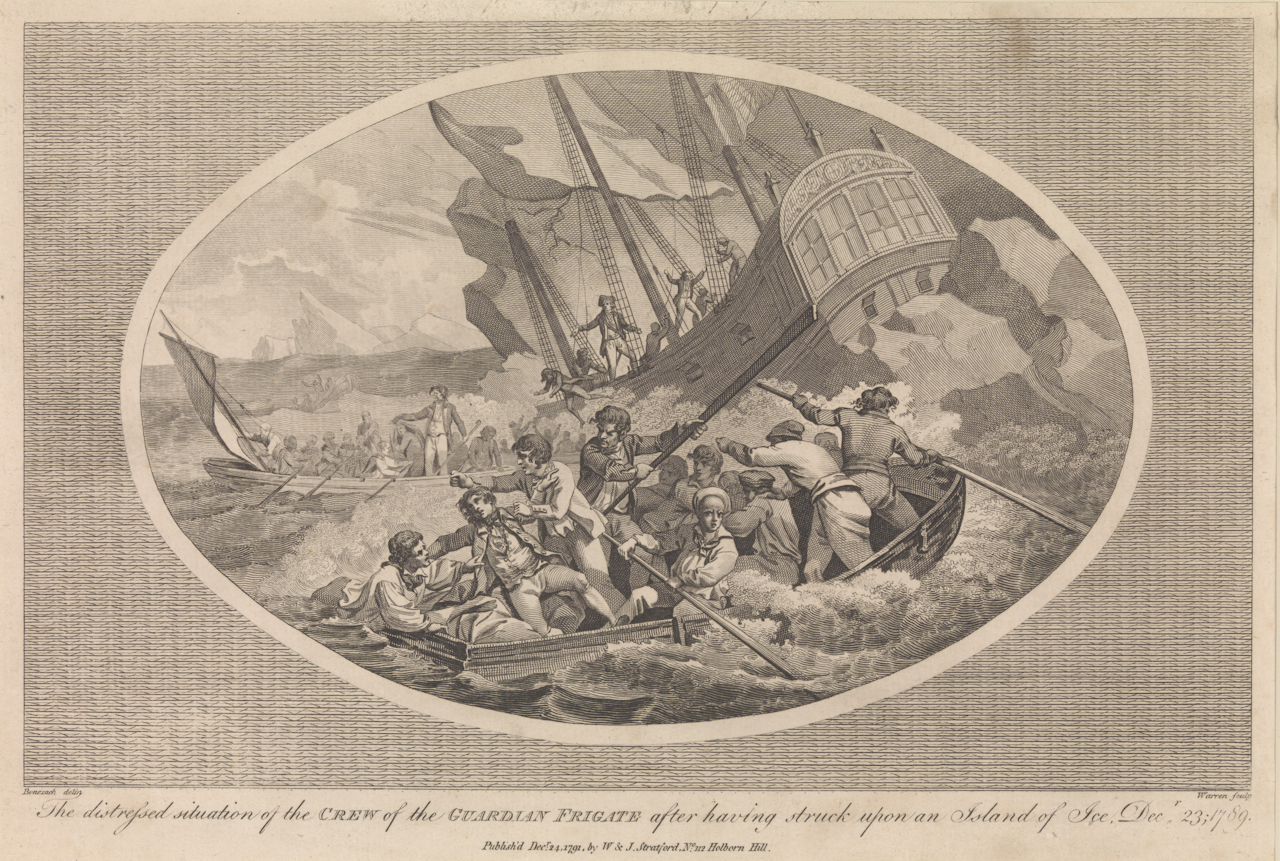
The distressed situation of the crew of the Guardian Frigate

For nine weeks Riou and his small crew navigated Guardian, by now little more than a raft, across the 400 leagues (1,900 km) to the Cape of Good Hope. The Cape was sighted on 21 February 1790, and whalers in Table Bay despatched seven boats to help Guardian to safety. (Note: Two of the whalers were Elizabeth and Margaret, Captain James Hopper, and Lucy, Captain Wiliam Gardner Dyer.) On 15 March Riou sent a letter from Table Bay expressing his intent to try reach Saldanha Bay, there to moor close to the shore to preserve what he could of the vessel and cargo. The letter also included a list of the 61 men and one woman (Elizabeth Schafer, daughter of one of the Superintendents of Convicts) on board Guardian.

A gale on 12 April drove Guardian on the beach. The wreck was sold on 17 February 1791.

== Aftermath ==
J. K. Laughton, writing in the Dictionary of National Biography, described the voyage as 'almost without parallel'. Of the boats sent out on 25 December only the launch, with 15 people, survived, having been rescued by a French merchant. The launch had witnessed the sinking of the jolly boat, before losing contact with the two cutters and the long-boat. The 21 convicts that survived went on to New South Wales. However, Riou's report of their conduct resulted in 14 of the convicts being pardoned. The remains of Guardian were sold on 8 February 1791.
