= Surfing locations in the Capes region of South West Western Australia =

Surfing locations in the Capes Region of Western Australia

Coordinates: 34°S 115°E

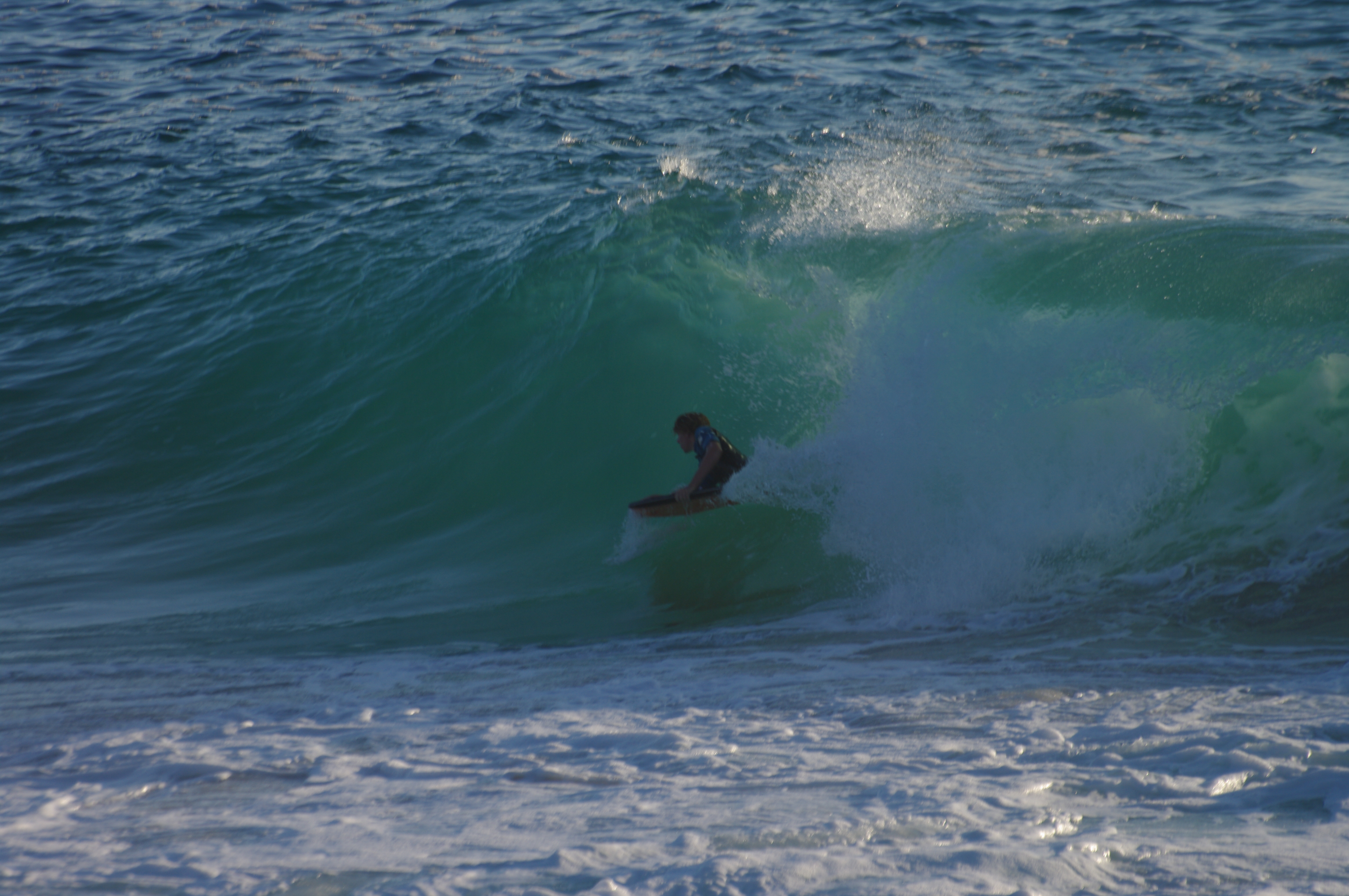
Wydalup Bay

Many surfing locations are found along the coast of the Capes Region in Western Australia. The Capes Region, also known as Cape to Cape, is situated between Cape Naturaliste and Cape Leeuwin, within a larger region known as the South West. Despite their wide geographic range, most surf breaks in the Capes Region tend to be associated with Margaret River, situated roughly central to the stretch of coast along which they are located.

== Context ==
Surfing in this region was well-established in the 1970s, with a 1970 government mapping guide to the region identifying surfing locations. By the 1990s, the names of the individual breaks were so well-established that online and print published guides were able to locate and identify the behaviours of the breaks. The surfing culture of the region is well-embedded in the communities along the coast.

The roads named below run off Caves Road, the main western route between Dunsborough and Augusta. The identification of nearby roads does not guarantee that there is access to any of these locations. Some systems of describing locations have Margaret River North – this list divides as below, using Yallingup, and Gracetown, as boundaries of smaller surfing regions. The Ngari Capes Marine Park has some of the many breaks listed below in 'Special Purpose Zone (Surfing)' locations within the park.

== East of Cape Naturaliste ==
These breaks are in the south-west corner of Geographe Bay, sheltered by Cape Naturaliste, and are not directly exposed to westerly winds and surges.

- Castle Rock – north of Dunsborough, and south of Eagle Bay
- Rocky Point – north of Eagle Bay, and east of Bunker Bay
- The Farm and Bone Yards – east of Bunker Bay
- The Quarries – north-west corner of Bunker Bay

== South of Cape Naturaliste and north of Yallingup ==
These breaks are in an isolated and difficult to access area of the coast north of Yallingup.

- Windmills – north of Sugarloaf Rock (Note: The surfing area has been allocated a 'special zone' for surfing within the Ngari Capes Marine Park.)
- Three Bears – midway between Sugarloaf Rock and Yallingup
- Yallingup and Rabbit Hill (Note: Also found with incorrect spelling of Rabits.) – just north of Yallingup

== South of Yallingup and north of Gracetown ==
The beaches Three Bears, Yallingup, Smiths Beach and Injidup are all considered "beaches of Yallingup" with related surf breaks of the same names. These breaks are mostly more accessible, but not all.

- Smiths and Supertubes – at Smiths Beach
- Injidup Point/Carparks and Pea Break – south end of Indijup Beach and just north of Cape Clairault
- Cape Clairault – just south of location with same name
- Wildcat and The Window – west of Quinninup Road
- Moses Rock – at west end of road with same name
- Honeycombs – isolated and south of Moses Rock Road
- Gallows – at end of Cullen Road
- Guillotine – west of Juniper Road
- North Point – at northern side of Cowaramup Bay
- Mousetraps – south of Supertubes

== Gracetown and south to the Margaret River mouth ==
Gracetown is a locality on the coastline at Cowaramup Bay, and Prevelly is situated on the southern shore at the mouth of the Margaret River.

- Cowaramup Bombora ("Cow Bombie")
- South Point and Huzzawouie (Huzzas) – southern side of Cowaramup Bay
- Left Handers – south of Cowaramup Bay
- The Womb
- Ellensbrook
- The Box – at Cape Mentelle
- The Rivermouth

== Prevelly and south to Redgate ==
Just south of the Margaret River mouth, Surfers Point is the location of Margaret River Pro surfing events, and the central point that tourism promotions and simplified explanations of the surfing region focus upon.

- Surfers Point and Southside
- Bombies and Boatramp
- Grunters
- Gas Bay
- Boodjidup
- Redgate

== Redgate and south to Cape Hamelin ==
Breaks and locations between Redgate and Cape Hamelin are more spread out, and not as easily accessed as some northern breaks.

- Conto's Beach – just north of Cape Freycinet
- Boranup – north of Hamelin Bay
- Deepdene – just south of Cape Hamelin
