= Ngari Capes Marine Park =

Marine park in Western Australia

- IUCN category II (national park)
- Location within Western Australia
- Location: Western Australia
- Nearest city: Busselton
- Coordinates: 33°51′4″S 114°57′7″E
- Area: 1,237.9 km^{2} (478.0 sq mi)
- Established: 12 June 2012
- Governing body: WA Department of Environment and Conservation; WA Department of Fisheries
- Website: Official website

The Ngari Capes Marine Park is a marine protected area on the lower south west coast of Western Australia, located approximately 250 kilometres (160 mi) south of Perth. The 123,790-hectare (305,900-acre) marine park was gazetted on 12 June 2012 and the park's western and southern boundaries are the limit of coastal waters of Western Australia, abutting the South-west Corner Marine Park located within the Australian Commonwealth exclusive economic zone.

== Features ==
The dive wreck of HMAS Swan is located within the park waters, between Dunsborough and Cape Naturaliste.

The park includes a significant number of sanctuary, surfing, shore-based activity and recreation zones.

The largest sanctuary zones are East Geographe, Eagle Bay, Cape Naturaliste, Injidup, Cape Freycinet, Cape Leeuwin and East Flinders Bay. From the north to the south, some of the special sanctuary zones within the park are East Geographe, Central Geographe Bay, Eagle Bay, Eagle Bay Special Purpose Zone (shore-based activities), Cape Naturaliste, and Windmills Special Purpose Zone (SPZ) (surfing).

=== Named zones ===
Named zones in the park, (SPZ meaning Special Purpose Zone, usually surfing) from the north:

- East Geographe Bay Sanctuary Zone
- Busselton Jetty Sanctuary Zone
- Central Geographe Bay Sanctuary Zone
- Eagle Bay Sanctuary and Special purpose zones
- Cape Naturaliste Sanctuary zone
- Windmills SPZ (Special Purpose zone)
- Three Bears SPZ
- Yallingup SPZ and Sanctuary zones
- Wyadup Sanctuary Zone (also known as Wyadup rocks, Wyadup beach, and Wyadup bay)
- Injidup Sanctuary Zone (adjacent to Cape Clairault)
- Moses Rock SPZ
- Goannas SPZ
- Moses Beach SPZ
- Gallows/Guillotine SPZ
- Cowaramup Bay Recreation zone
- Lefthanders SPZ
- Kilcarnup Sanctuary Zone
- Margaret River SPZ
- Redgate SPZ
- Cape Freycinet Sanctuary zone
- Hamelin Bay Recreation and Sanctuary zones
- Cosy Corner SPZ and Sanctuary zones
- Cape Leeuwin Sanctuary Zone
- Flinders Island Sanctuary Zone
- East Flinders Bay Sanctuary Zone

== See also ==
- Integrated Marine and Coastal Regionalisation of Australia
- Protected areas of Western Australia
- Surfing locations in the Capes region of South West Western Australia
