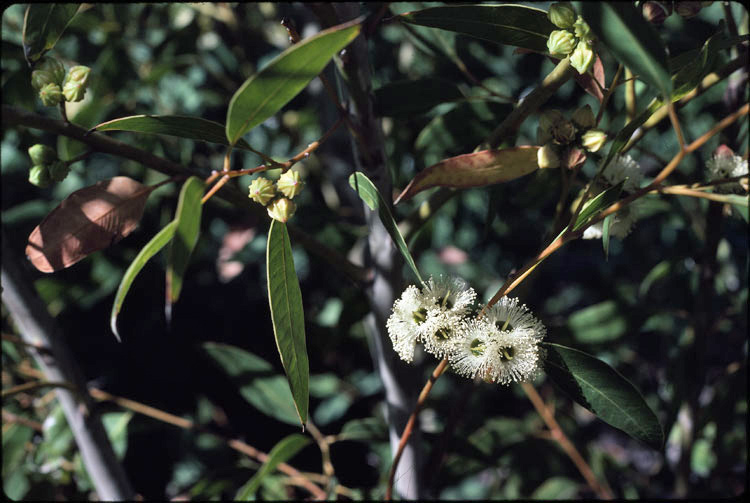

Conservation status
- Vulnerable (IUCN 3.1)

Scientific classification
- Kingdom: Plantae
- Clade: Tracheophytes
- Clade: Angiosperms
- Clade: Eudicots
- Clade: Rosids
- Order: Myrtales
- Family: Myrtaceae
- Genus: Eucalyptus
- Species: E. calcicola

Binomial name
- Eucalyptus calcicola Brooker

= Eucalyptus calcicola =

Boranup mallee

Species of eucalyptus

Eucalyptus calcicola, commonly known as the Boranup mallee, Harry Butler's mallee or Hamelin Bay mallee, is a mallee that is endemic to a small area in the south-west of Western Australia. It has smooth, pale greenish bark, lance-shaped to curved adult leaves, flower buds in groups of seven or nine, white flowers and ribbed, cup-shaped to hemispherical fruit.

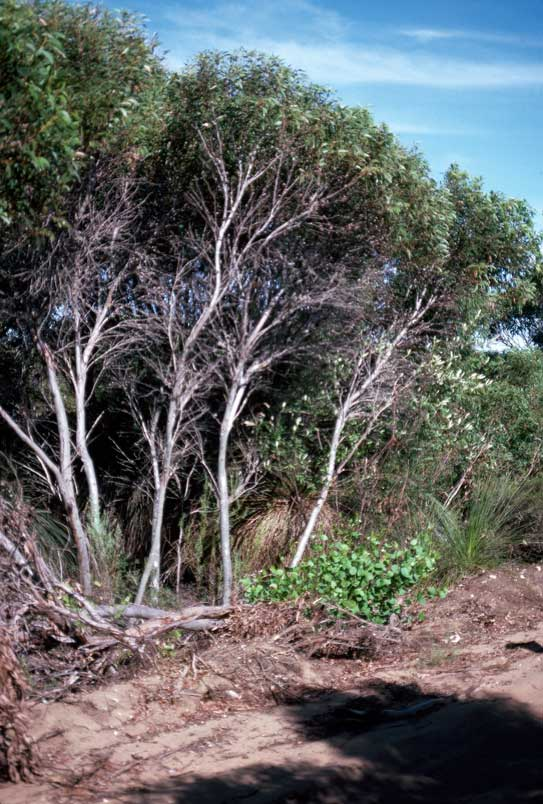
Habit at Cape Freycinet

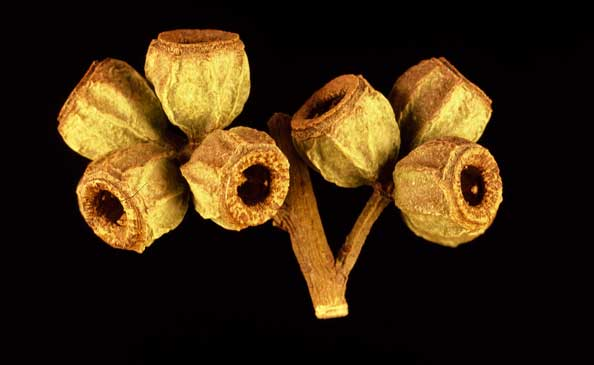
Fruit

== Description ==
Eucalyptus calcicola is a mallee that grows to a height of 2.5–8 metres (8–26 ft) and forms a lignotuber. It has smooth, pale greenish grey bark that is shed in strips. Young plants and coppice regrowth have leaves arranged in opposite pairs, broadly egg-shaped, 45–90 mm (1.8–3.5 in) long, 30–67 mm (1–3 in) wide and sessile. Adult leaves are arranged alternately, lance-shaped to curved, 60–110 mm (2.4–4.3 in) long, 12–20 mm (0.5–0.8 in) wide on a petiole 13–25 mm (0.51–0.98 in) long and are the same slightly glossy mid-green on both sides. The flower buds are arranged in groups of seven or nine on a flattened peduncle 12–18 mm (0.47–0.71 in) long, the individual buds on a pedicel up to 6 mm (0.24 in) long. The mature buds are oval, 9–15 mm (0.35–0.59 in) long and 5–9 mm (0.20–0.35 in) wide with a conical operculum. Flowering occurs between January and June and the flowers are white. The fruits is a woody, cup-shaped to hemispherical capsule 9–13 mm (0.35–0.51 in) long and 11–15 mm (0.43–0.59 in) wide with the valves below the rim.

== Taxonomy and naming ==
Eucalyptus calcicola was first formally described in 1974 by Ian Brooker from a specimen collected by K.M Allen in 1971 from near Cape Freycinet. The description was published in the journal Nuytsia.

In 2002, Dean Nicolle described two subspecies:

- Eucalyptus calcicola subsp. calcicola has strongly ribbed fruit that is 12–16 mm (0.47–0.63 in) in diameter;
- Eucalyptus calcicola subsp. unita has weakly ribbed fruit that is 10–12 mm (0.39–0.47 in) in diameter.

The specific epithet (calcicola) is derived from Latin words meaning "limestone" and "dweller" referring to the habitat of this species. The epithet unita is a Latin word meaning "united", referring to this subspecies being a link between subspecies calcicola and E. ligulata.

== Distribution and habitat ==
Subspecies calcicola mainly grows on limestone dunes between Cape Freycinet and Cape Hamelin in far south coastal regions of Western Australia. Subspecies unita occurs between Point Hillier near Denmark and Bremer Bay.

== Conservation ==
Both subspecies of E. calcicola are classified as "Priority Four" by the Government of Western Australia Department of Parks and Wildlife, meaning that is rare or near threatened.

== See also ==
- List of Eucalyptus species
