= Naturaliste, Western Australia =

Locality in the City of Busselton, Western Australia

Naturaliste
- Suburb
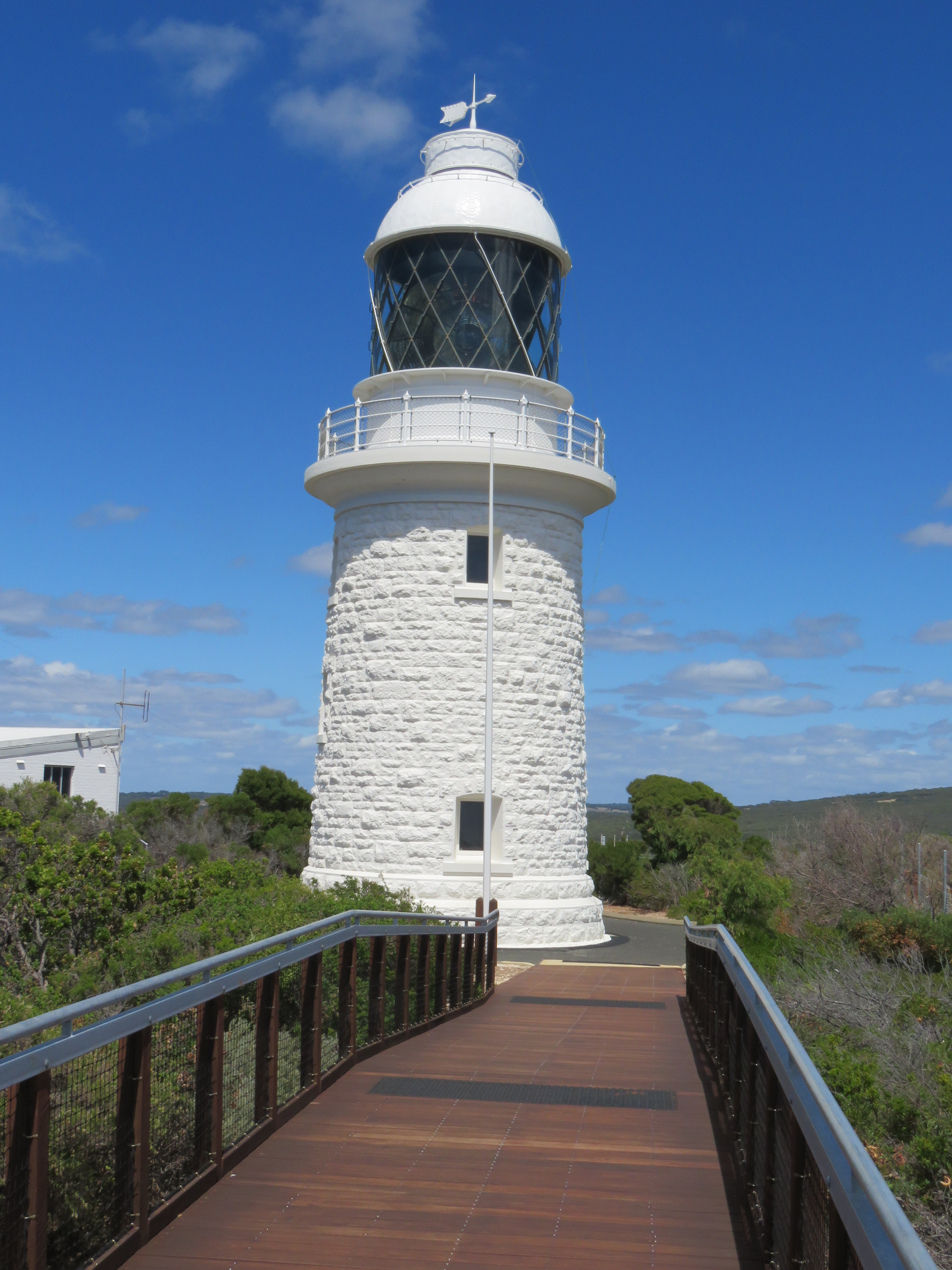
- The state heritage-listed Cape Naturaliste Lighthouse
- Interactive map of Naturaliste
- Coordinates: 33.58°S 115.05°E
- Country: Australia
- State: Western Australia
- LGA: City of Busselton
- Location: 255 km (158 mi) from Perth; 33 km (21 mi) from Busselton

Government
  - State electorate: Vasse
  - Federal division: Forrest

Area
  - Total: 56 km^{2} (22 sq mi)

Population
  - Total: 107 (SAL 2021)
- Postcode: 6281
Suburbs around Naturaliste
Indian Ocean	Indian Ocean	Geographe Bay
Indian Ocean	Naturaliste	Eagle Bay
Quedjinup	Yallingup	Dunsborough

Naturaliste is a rural locality of the City of Busselton in the South West region of Western Australia, located on a peninsula between the Indian Ocean and Geographe Bay. At the northern point of the peninsula and locality lies Cape Naturaliste and the state heritage-listed Cape Naturaliste Lighthouse. The northern-most part of the Leeuwin-Naturaliste National Park is also located with the locality.

The City of Busselton and the locality of Naturaliste are located on the traditional land of the Wardandi (also spelled Wadandi) people of the Noongar nation.

The locality is home to a number of heritage-listed sites, among them the site of the former Castle Bay Whaling Station, and Sugar Loaf Rock.
