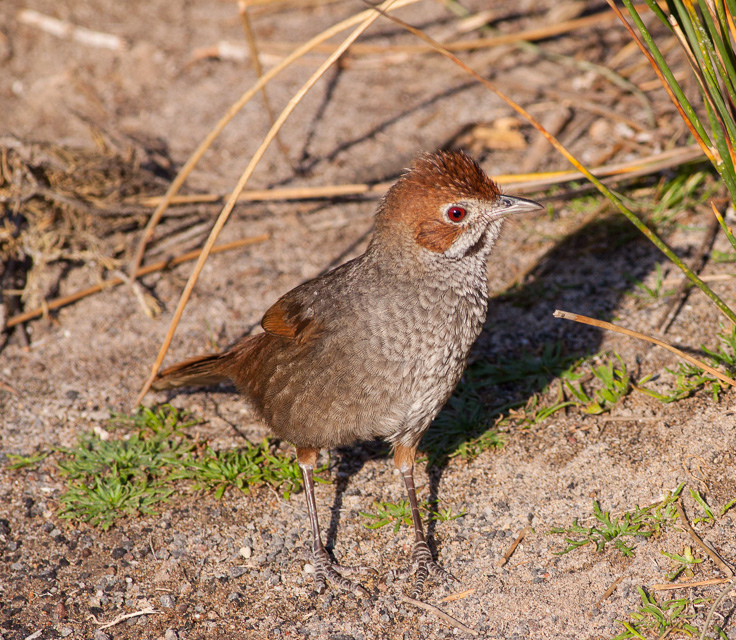

Conservation status
- Least Concern (IUCN 3.1)

Scientific classification
- Kingdom: Animalia
- Phylum: Chordata
- Class: Aves
- Order: Passeriformes
- Family: Dasyornithidae
- Genus: Dasyornis
- Species: D. broadbenti

Binomial name
- Dasyornis broadbenti (McCoy, 1867)

Synonyms
- Sphenura Broadbenti (protonym); D. b. whitei Mathews, 1912

= Rufous bristlebird =

Species of bird

The rufous bristlebird (Dasyornis broadbenti) is one of three extant species of bristlebirds. It is endemic to Australia and three subspecies have been described, from coastal south-western Western Australia, south-eastern South Australia and south-western Victoria. Its natural habitat is coastal shrublands and heathlands. It is threatened by habitat destruction.

== Subspecies ==
The species Dasyornis broadbenti comprises three geographically separated subspecies, one of which is extinct:

- Dasyornis broadbenti broadbenti (McCoy, 1867) - the Coorong rufous bristlebird occurs from the mouth of the Coorong in South Australia to Portland Bay and Port Fairy in Victoria.
- D. b. caryochrous Schodde & Mason, 1999 - the Otways rufous bristlebird is found on the coast of the Otway Ranges in Victoria from Peterborough to Anglesea.
- D. b. litoralis (Milligan, 1902) - the extinct western rufous bristlebird formerly occurred in Southwest Australia between Cape Naturaliste and Cape Mentelle.

== Description ==
The rufous bristlebird is a medium-sized bird (approximately 77g) that is predominantly brown, with a long tail and short rounded wings. It has a rich rufous coloured head and ear coverts. The mantle, back and neck are dark brown with a faint reddish wash and a red-brown rump. A light grey marking surrounds the bird's eye and extends to the bill. The eyes of the rufous bristlebird are a reddish colour. Their legs and feet are a dark brown or grey-brown colour. It has a whitish throat with dark scalloping and a grey-brown breast also with scalloping. Compared to the east where the scalloping is dark, in the western part of the bird's range the scalloping is white. The rufous bristlebird is a similar size to the blackbird yet is unique due to its distinct features including its long tail, acoustic signals and rufous colour.

== Habitat and distribution ==
Rufous bristlebirds are predominately found and distributed across Australia and its states. Formerly, they also ranged within southern Western Australia, however, now they only reside across coastal regions of western Victoria and south-eastern South Australia. Well-known locations are near the Murray River mouth in South Australia, and Portland and Port Fairy in Victoria. The rufous bristlebird was found to have a slow recolonization rate. They have also been located in heathlands, on coastal clifftops and in low-lying forested valleys in the Otway Ranges of south-western Victoria. The first records of the rufous bristlebird within the heath were in 1985 and the next one in 1981. Prior to these dates, there had been wildfires that swept through this region in South Australia. The first records were located at Salt Creek, which was one of the few lightly-burnt areas in this region that could have provided a safe shelter and supportive habitat.

Their preferred habitat is in dense shrubland and heathlands amongst a diverse range of plant species. They are also commonly found within forests where there is an understory of bracken and/or shrubs. The bird can be detected running or flying short distances, darting in and out of the relatively dense understory in which it shelters and feeds. The rufous bristlebird also lives near thick and natural vegetation. Vegetation structures are a superior predictor of habitat for the rufous bristlebird. Bristlebirds as a whole have habitats that are dominated by environmental weeds. Acacia sophorae and Leptospermum laevigatum are both weeds that meet the necessities of the vegetation structure of bristlebirds, as well as rufous bristlebirds. Environmental weeds must be taken into consideration for future habitats of the rufous bristlebird with stable management.

Around Portland, a town on the west coast of Victoria, the bird's population appears to be stable. The area that surrounds Portland Aluminium refinery is called the Portland Heathland. It consists of coastal heathland and shrubland, which has ecological diversity as well as a range of vegetation communities, ideal to the bird's preferred habitat. The Portland habitat is similar to the habitat of the eastern Victorian subspecies, D.b. caryochrous. This reinforces particular conservationist management plans that could tailor to both subspecies of the bird. In a study, there was an estimated 70 to 86 individual rufous bristlebirds within a 170ha survey area in Portland, south-western Victoria.

Further studies conducted in Victoria have found that the rufous bristlebird prefers areas at a relatively low altitude, near coastal edges and drainage systems, as well as dense vertical vegetation structure. A study found that 70% of rufous bristlebirds were located within 100m of drainage lines. That revealed that water areas can provide the bird with denser vegetation within its habitat, as well as moister soil conditions, due to the potential lack of sunlight. The bird has also been found about 5 km inland, with most of the detections (approximately 60%) less than 2 km from the coast in 2006.

D. b. broadbenti and D. b. caryochrous, the last two remaining subspecies of the rufous bristlebird, are separated by approximately 100 km in South Australia. Since 1984, there have been 76 records of the rufous bristlebird that have been collected in the Coorong National Park, in South Australia. They have also been detected in the six remnant patches of native vegetation that are outside the Coorong National Park.

Agricultural and urban development is a potent threat to the Otway subspecies, D. b. caryochrous. As well, the flammable nature of the bird's habitat has the potential for loss and destruction by wildfire.

== Behaviour ==
=== Acoustic signals ===
Rufous bristlebirds have the ability to loudly signal, communicate and sing to each other. Their signals are uttered all year yet can differ between population groups and subspecies. Rufous bristlebirds acquire song repertoires of between 12 and 30 different song-types. Only a proportion of these songs are shared between different individuals. As there are multiple song-types, the relationship between individuals and the song can be considered as quite complex. Studies have revealed there is no sharing of song types between male and female rufous bristlebirds. However, within the sexes, there was a high level of song sharing displayed. Within their immediate territorial neighbours, males shared around 65% of song types and females shared 59% of song types. It has been noted that there is a consistent amount of song sharing amongst neighbouring rufous bristlebirds with the observed relationship between sedentary behaviour and the high levels of song sharing. The rufous bristlebird is commonly found more by their signals and calls rather than sightings. Earlier settlers used dogs to trigger bird movement in order to sight them.

=== Feeding ===
The rufous bristlebird predominately feeds off seeds and small ground-dwelling invertebrates. Usually, they search for food off the ground; however, they also forage amongst leaf litter or in short shrubs whilst collecting insects or grubs. These are easy to catch and provide nutrition. The rufous bristlebird has also been found eating terrestrial snails.

=== Breeding ===
Rufous bristlebirds build a domed nest very close to the ground. The nest consists of sword-sedge, rushes, grass and twigs which is then organised and positioned within a low shrub or sword-sedge. Eventually, two dull-pinkish eggs with blotches are laid, and hatched by the female bird. They usually breed throughout spring into the middle of summer (August to January). Rufous bristlebirds are detected at greater frequencies during the nesting season, as well as in the mornings. It has been noted that crossbreeding with other species has not been recorded in the wild.

== Threats ==
Loss of habitat, predation and roadkill are the most significant threats towards the rufous bristlebird. The quality of habitat within Victoria's south-west National and Coastal Parks can be impacted by town development. This is a threat towards the population of the bird as town development can cause destruction of habitat and disrupt the rufous bristlebird's natural composition. Clearing for infrastructure, homes and roads, as well as burning for fire protection and weed invasion can destroy appropriate habitats for the bird.

The rufous bristlebird has a limited ability to fly, which makes it easier prey for red foxes (Vulpes vulpes) and cats (Felis catus). The bird is also inclined to have high rates of road mortality, especially around vegetation areas that provide habitats near roads. Higher than normal temperatures since 1998 and decreased rainfall levels in south-eastern Australia have affected the overall bristlebird population. Climate change has increased the risk of fires and other natural disasters, which as a result can drastically decrease the bird's food sources and vegetation structures. It has been noted that higher fire frequency has contributed to the extinction of the western subspecies, D. b. litoralis. Rufous bristlebirds are also known to be sensitive to fire, so that burning of their habitat should be avoided where possible. In order for the rufous bristlebird to live in suitable conditions, further work is needed to discover size and spatial continuity within their areas of habitat.

Recovery plans can aid in the support of the rufous bristlebird and their conservation status due to these various threats. There are some identified actions that require on-going implementation. There have been sites chosen, including Otway National Park, Lorne Angahook State Park, Port Campbell National Park, Bay of Islands Coastal Park, Lower Glenelg National Park and Discovery Bay Coastal Park, which will be monitored. These ten sites are within the Victorian range of the rufous bristlebird's habitat. Creating surveys on the rufous bristlebird will establish population densities and distributions. In order to prevent roadkill, the implementation of slow down signs through conversations with the local government and VicRoads. These can be placed appropriately near foraging areas and minor roads. The development of education and information on the bird will help the wider public to understand the status of the bird. This can be done through supplying information to park managers, local government bodies, communities and landholders. In regard to the rufous bristlebird's habitat within gullies and drainage lines, an improvement and enhancement of systems in corridors would improve quality of habitat. Research is also needed to improve the management of their population. It is encouraged that those who sight rufous bristlebirds report it to the Victorian Biodiversity Atlas.

== Conservation status ==
The rufous bristlebird is considered by the International Union for Conservation of Nature (IUCN) to be of least concern. Both subspecies occurring in Victoria are listed as threatened under the Victorian Flora and Fauna Guarantee Act 1988. Under this Act, an Action Statement for the recovery and future management of this species has been prepared. On the 2007 advisory list of threatened vertebrate fauna in Victoria, both subspecies of the rufous bristlebird that occur within the state are separately listed as near threatened.

Within New South Wales, Northern Territory, Queensland and Tasmania, the rufous bristlebird is not present. The rufous bristlebird is rare, threatened and extinct in South Australia, Victoria and Western Australia respectively. On a federal conservation level, they are considered secure. Overall, the population of the rufous bristlebird in Southern Australia was estimated to be at least 17,800. The western rufous bristlebird is listed as extinct under the Australian Environment Protection and Biodiversity Conservation Act 1999. It used to range from Cape Mentelle to Cape Naturaliste within south-west Western Australia. In 1906, the last confirmation of this subspecies was recorded, although unofficial reports were still being made as recently as 1977. The species as a whole is listed as lower risk and or near threatened. As a result, monitoring and examinations of the subspecies still need to occur. Ways of improving the management of the rufous bristlebird population can include conducting research through ecological studies and gathering information on natality and mortality of the species. Fragmentation of habitat is a concern due to coastal developments as they are ongoing and therefore reduce availability of natural habitat for the bird.
