= Quedjinup, Western Australia =

Locality in the City of Busselton, Western Australia

Quedjinup
- Suburb
- Interactive map of Quedjinup
- Coordinates: 33.63°S 115.08°E
- Country: Australia
- State: Western Australia
- LGA: City of Busselton
- Location: 250 km (160 mi) from Perth; 28 km (17 mi) from Busselton

Government
  - State electorate: Vasse
  - Federal division: Forrest

Area
  - Total: 8 km^{2} (3.1 sq mi)

Population
  - Total: 420 (SAL 2021)
- Postcode: 6281
Suburbs around Quedjinup
Naturaliste	Dunsborough	Dunsborough
Naturaliste	Quedjinup	Dunsborough
Yallingup	Quindalup	Quindalup

Quedjinup is a semi-rural locality of the City of Busselton in the South West region of Western Australia, located adjacent to the west of the town of Dunsborough. The northern border of the locality is formed by Caves Road.

The City of Busselton and the locality of Quedjinup are located on the traditional land of the Wardandi (also spelled Wadandi) people of the Noongar nation. The name Quedjinup means "place of women" in the Wardandi dialect of the Noongar language and the Wardandi people used the name to refer to the area that is now Dunsborough.

Dunsborough Christian College, a co-educational primary and secondary college, is in Quedjinup.
