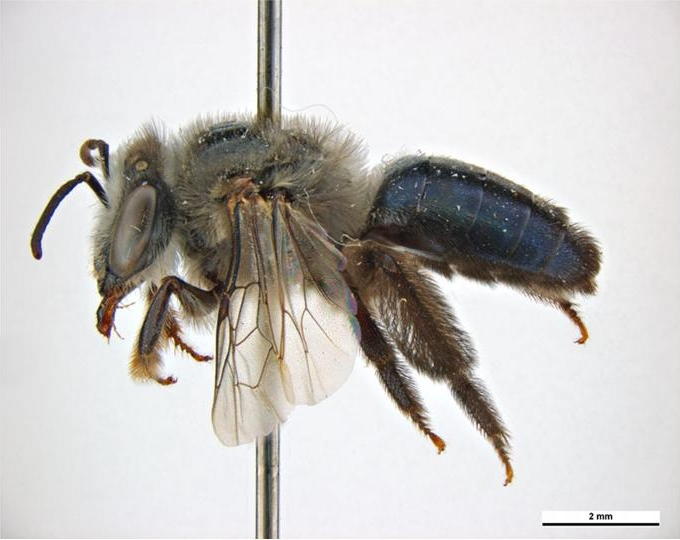
- Female

Scientific classification
- Kingdom: Animalia
- Phylum: Arthropoda
- Clade: Pancrustacea
- Class: Insecta
- Order: Hymenoptera
- Family: Colletidae
- Genus: Leioproctus
- Species: L. clypeatus

Binomial name
- Leioproctus clypeatus (Cockerell, 1916)

Synonyms
- Paracolletes clypeatus Cockerell, 1916

= Leioproctus clypeatus =

Species of bee

Leioproctus clypeatus, or Leioproctus (Cladocerapis) clypeatus, is a species of bee in the family Colletidae and subfamily Colletinae. It is endemic to Australia. It was described by British-American entomologist Theodore Dru Alison Cockerell in 1916.

== Description ==
Female body length is 11 mm, male is 10 mm. Colouration is mainly black, abdomen dark purple, with white to grey hair.

== Distribution and habitat ==
The species occurs in south-west Western Australia. The type locality is Yallingup. It has also been recorded from the Fitzgerald River National Park.

== Behaviour ==
The adults are solitary flying mellivores that nest in the ground. Flowering plants visited by the bees include Persoonia species.
