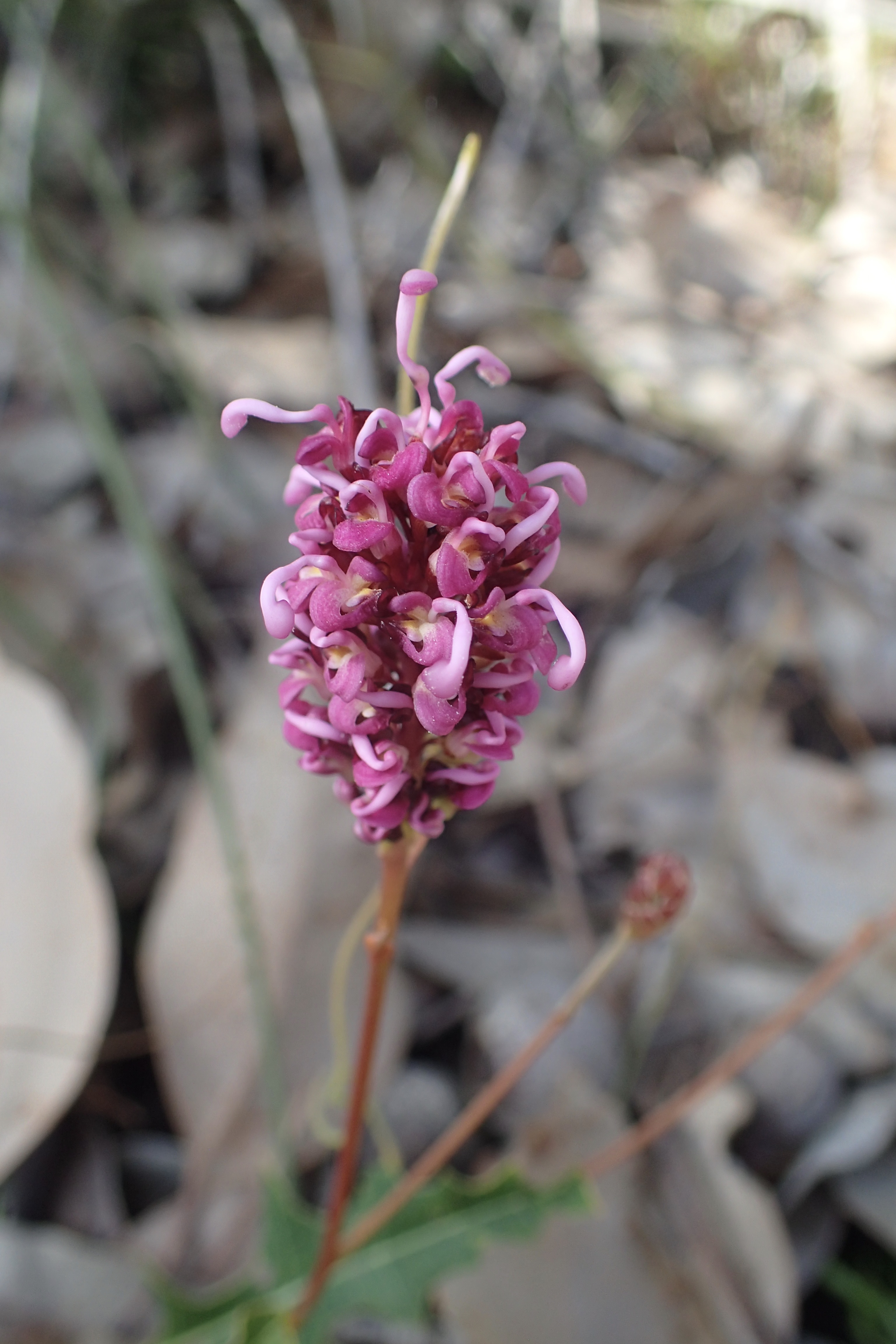

Scientific classification
- Kingdom: Plantae
- Clade: Tracheophytes
- Clade: Angiosperms
- Clade: Eudicots
- Order: Proteales
- Family: Proteaceae
- Genus: Grevillea
- Species: G. quercifolia

Binomial name
- Grevillea quercifolia R.Br.

Synonyms
- List: Anadenia brachyantha Meisn.; Anadenia quercifolia (R.Br.) Endl.; Grevillea brachyantha Lindl.; Grevillea glaucina Gand.; Grevillea lactucifolia Gand.; Grevillea quercifolia var. angustifolia Benth.; Grevillea quercifolia R.Br. var. quercifolia

= Grevillea quercifolia =

Species of shrub endemic to Western Australia

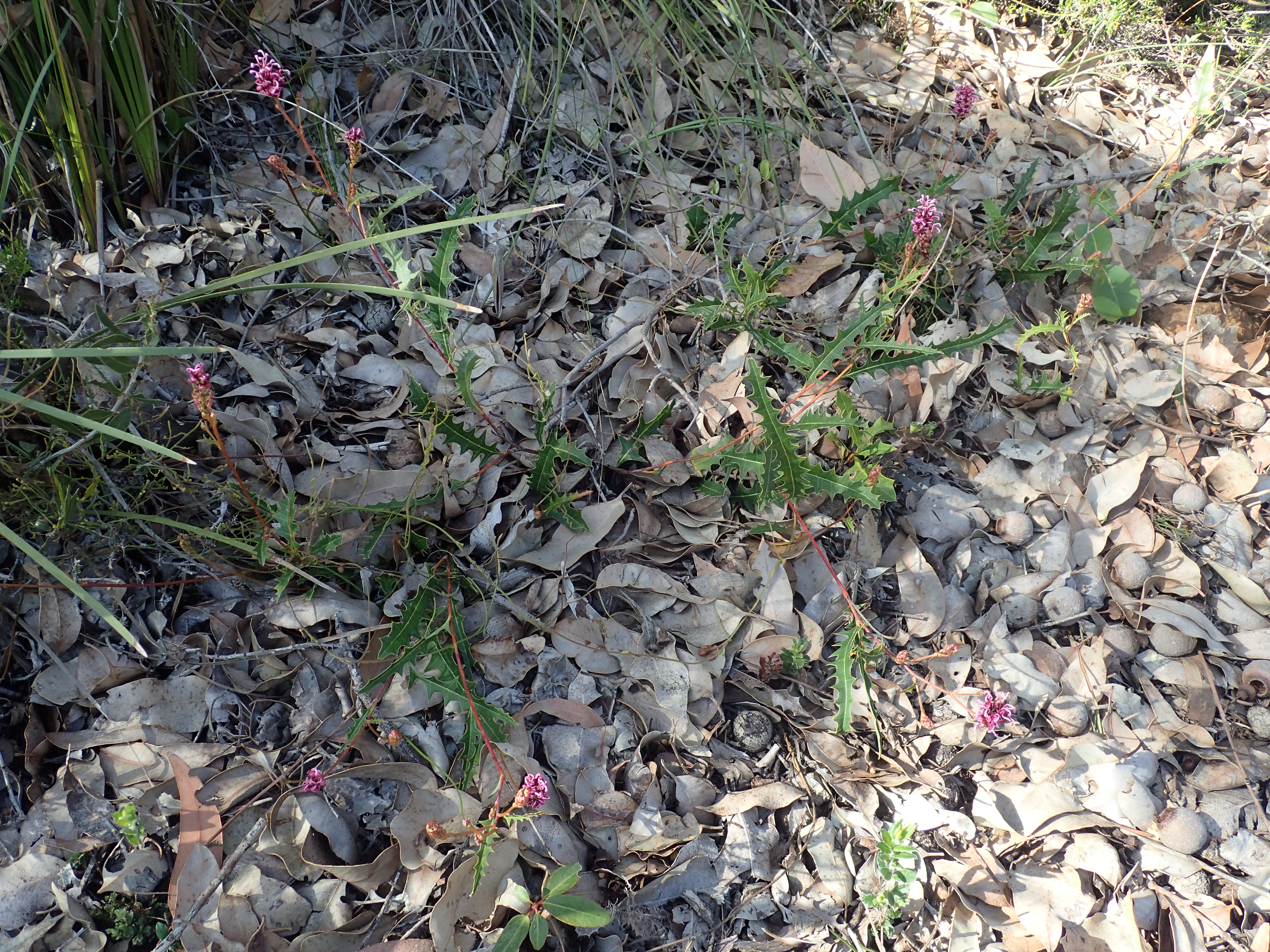
Habit near the Cape Naturaliste lighthouse

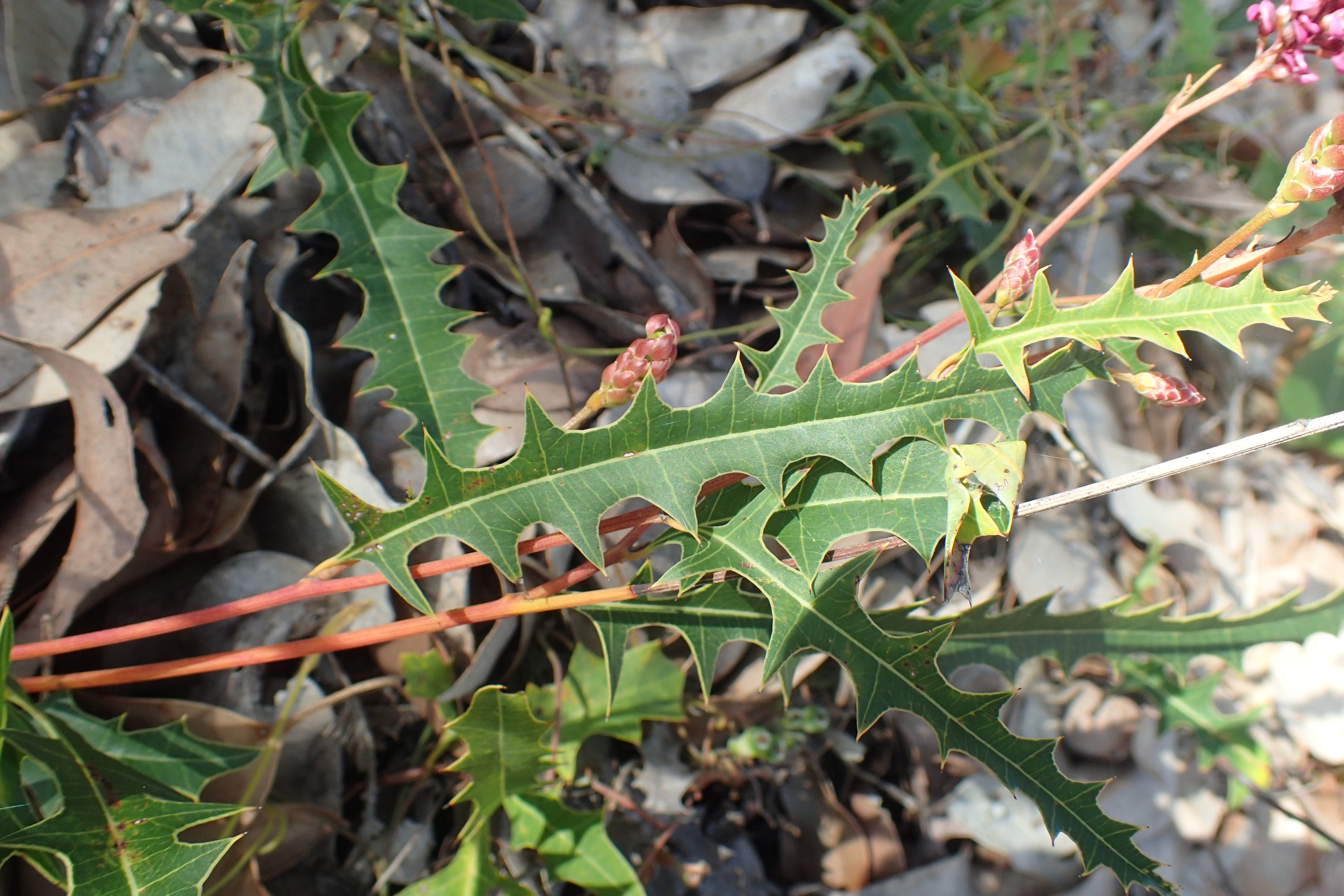
Leaves

Grevillea quercifolia, commonly known as the oak-leaf grevillea, is a species of flowering plant in the protea family and is endemic to the southwest of Western Australia. It is a straggly to sprawling shrub usually with pinnatifid or serrated leaves, and oval to cylindrical clusters of pale to deep pink flowers.

== Description ==
Grevillea quercifolia is a straggly to sprawling shrub that typically grows to up to 0.6 m (2 ft 0 in) high and 1–3 m (3 ft 3 in – 9 ft 10 in) wide. Its leaves are usually pinnatifid to more or less serrated, glabrous, oblong to narrowly egg-shaped, mostly 35–200 mm (1.4–7.9 in) long and 25–60 mm (0.98–2.36 in) wide, with about 5 to 15 triangular to oblong lobes 5–15 mm (0.20–0.59 in) long and 2–10 mm (0.079–0.394 in) wide. The flowers are usually arranged on the ends of branches in oval to cylindrical clusters on a rachis 15–50 mm (0.59–1.97 in) long, and are pale to deep pink, the pistil 9–11.5 mm (0.35–0.45 in) long. The fruit is an oval to elliptic follicle 18–20 mm (0.71–0.79 in) long.

== Taxonomy ==
Grevillea quercifolia was first formally described in 1830 by Robert Brown in his Supplementum primum prodromi florae Novae Hollandiae. The specific epithet (quercifolia) means "oak-leaved".

== Distribution and habitat ==
Oak-leaved grevillea is widespread in the south-west of Western Australia, where it grows in heathland, shrubland or woodland from a little north of Perth to Augusta and east to Mount Barker and Albany in the Jarrah Forest, Swan Coastal Plain and Warren bioregions of south-western Western Australia.

== Conservation status ==
This grevillea is listed as "not threatened" by the Government of Western Australia Department of Biodiversity, Conservation and Attractions.
