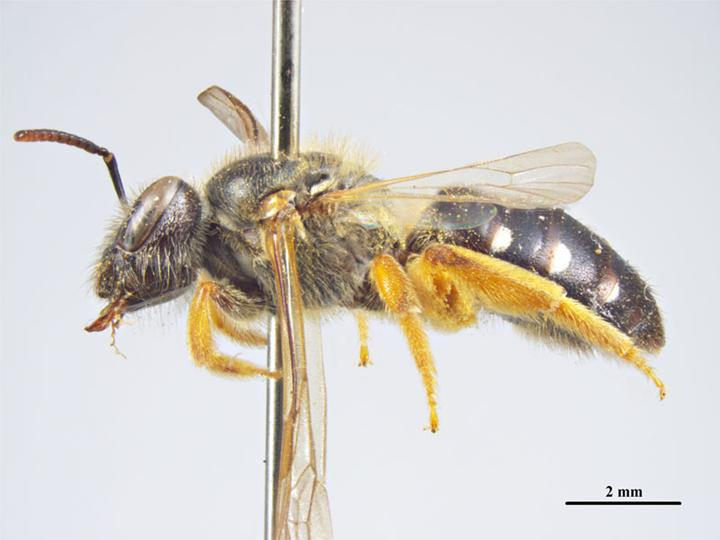
- Female
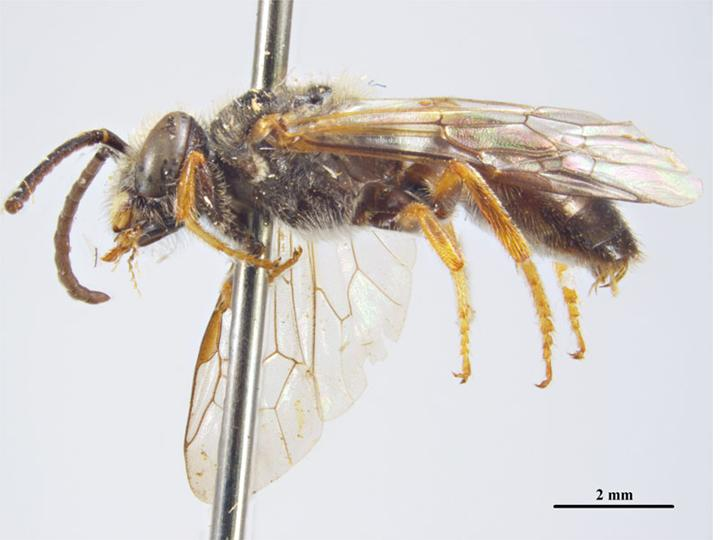
- Male

Scientific classification
- Kingdom: Animalia
- Phylum: Arthropoda
- Clade: Pancrustacea
- Class: Insecta
- Order: Hymenoptera
- Family: Halictidae
- Genus: Lasioglossum
- Species: L. mirandum

Binomial name
- Lasioglossum mirandum (Cockerell, 1914)

Synonyms
- Halictus mirandus Cockerell, 1914

= Lasioglossum mirandum =

Species of bee

Lasioglossum mirandum, or Lasioglossum (Chilalictus) mirandum, is a species of bee in the family Halictidae and subfamily Halictinae. It is endemic to Australia. It was described by British-American entomologist Theodore Dru Alison Cockerell in 1914.

== Description ==
Female body length is about 10–10.5 mm. Integumental colouration is mainly black, with red markings.

== Distribution and habitat ==
The species occurs in high rainfall areas of south-west Western Australia. The type locality is Yallingup.

== Behaviour ==
The adults are flying mellivores. Flowering plants visited by the bees include Eucalyptus, Grevillea, Hakea and Melaleuca species.
