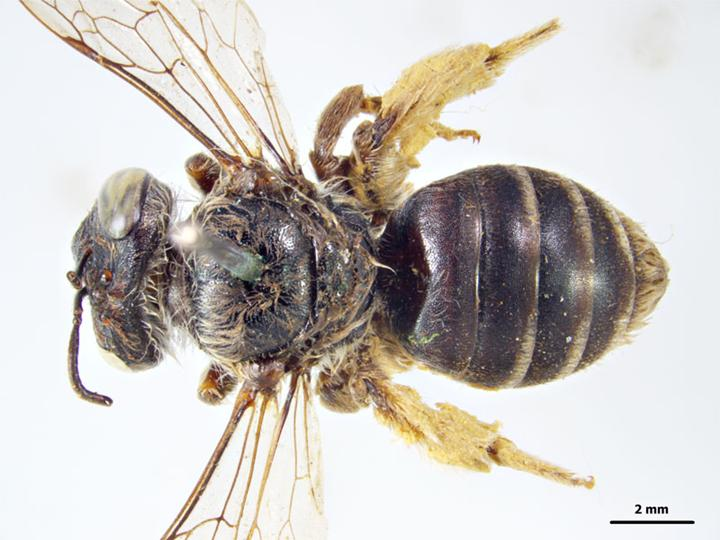
- Female

Scientific classification
- Kingdom: Animalia
- Phylum: Arthropoda
- Clade: Pancrustacea
- Class: Insecta
- Order: Hymenoptera
- Family: Colletidae
- Genus: Leioproctus
- Species: L. antennatus

Binomial name
- Leioproctus antennatus (Smith, 1879)

Synonyms
- Lamprocolletes antennatus Smith, 1879; Paracolletes andreniformis Cockerell, 1915

= Leioproctus antennatus =

Species of bee

Leioproctus antennatus, or Leioproctus (Ceratocolletes) antennatus, is a species of bee in the family Colletidae and subfamily Colletinae. It is endemic to Australia. It was described by English entomologist Frederick Smith in 1879.

== Distribution and habitat ==
The species occurs in south-west Western Australia. Type localities include Swan River and Yallingup.

== Behaviour ==
The adults are flying mellivores.

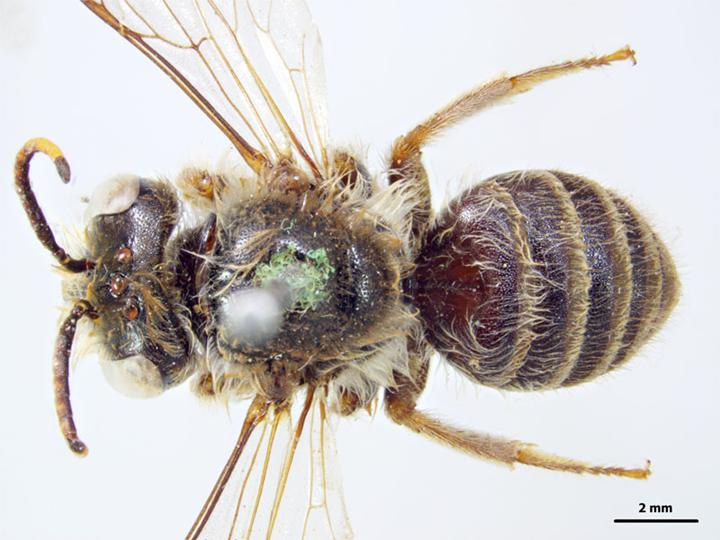
Male
