= Leioproctus purpurascens =

Scientific classification
- Kingdom: Animalia
- Phylum: Arthropoda
- Clade: Pancrustacea
- Class: Insecta
- Order: Hymenoptera
- Family: Colletidae
- Genus: Leioproctus
- Species: L. purpurascens

Binomial name
- Leioproctus purpurascens (Cockerell, 1914)

Synonyms
- Euryglossidia purpurascens Cockerell, 1914

Species of bee

Leioproctus purpurascens, or Leioproctus (Euryglossidia) purpurascens, is a species of bee in the family Colletidae and subfamily Colletinae. It is endemic to Australia. It was described by British-American entomologist Theodore Dru Alison Cockerell in 1914.

== Description ==
Female body length is about 9 mm, male about 8.5 mm. Colouration is mainly black, the abdomen a "dark rich chestnut-red, suffused with purple", with white hair.

== Distribution and habitat ==
The species occurs in south-west Western Australia. The type locality is Yallingup.

== Behaviour ==
The adults are flying mellivores. Flowering plants visited by the bees include Daviesia species.
