= Leioproctus nanus =

Scientific classification
- Kingdom: Animalia
- Phylum: Arthropoda
- Clade: Pancrustacea
- Class: Insecta
- Order: Hymenoptera
- Family: Colletidae
- Genus: Leioproctus
- Species: L. nanus

Binomial name
- Leioproctus nanus (Smith, 1879)

Synonyms
- Lamprocolletes nanus Smith, 1879; Paracolletes nigritulus Cockerell, 1916

Species of bee

Leioproctus nanus, or Leioproctus (Leioproctus) nanus, is a species of bee in the family Colletidae and subfamily Colletinae. It is endemic to Australia. It was described by English entomologist Frederick Smith in 1879.

== Distribution and habitat ==
The species occurs in Western Australia. The exact locality where the holotype was collected is unknown. A syntype is from Yallingup.

== Behaviour ==
The adults are flying mellivores.
