= Cape Hamelin =

Headland in Western Australia

Coordinates: 34.269°S 115.036°E

Cape Hamelin is a headland 7 kilometres (4.3 mi) south of Hamelin Bay in the Capes region of south-western Western Australia. Except for Cape Leeuwin, it is the southernmost of over 1,000 kilometres (620 mi) of features named by the French in their travels along the coast.

Wrecks of ships have occurred within the vicinity of the cape. The cape is in an area where crayfishing has been practised, and also where it has been restricted.

== See also ==
- Cape Freycinet
- Cape Mentelle
- Cape Clairault
