= Cape Clairault =

Point in Western Australia

Coordinates: 33°41′50″S 114°58′31″E

Cape Clairault is located south of Yallingup, Western Australia in the coastal region between Cape Naturaliste and Cape Leeuwin.

It was in 1803 named after French mathematician Alexis Claude Clairault by the Baudin expedition to Australia along the western coast of Australia. The cape name has been used in a range of local winery business names.

The beach at the location is considered hazardous, and there are surf breaks nearby: Injidup Point, Carparks and Pea Break to the north, and Wildcat and Window to the south of the cape. Cape Clairault break lies to the south of the cape.

By line of sight, Cape Clairault extends out from the coast enough to be seen from Cape Naturaliste, and vice versa, and as a consequence is often cited as a landmark within the range of the Cape Naturaliste Lighthouse light.

== See also ==
- Cape Freycinet
- Cape Mentelle
- Cape Hamelin
