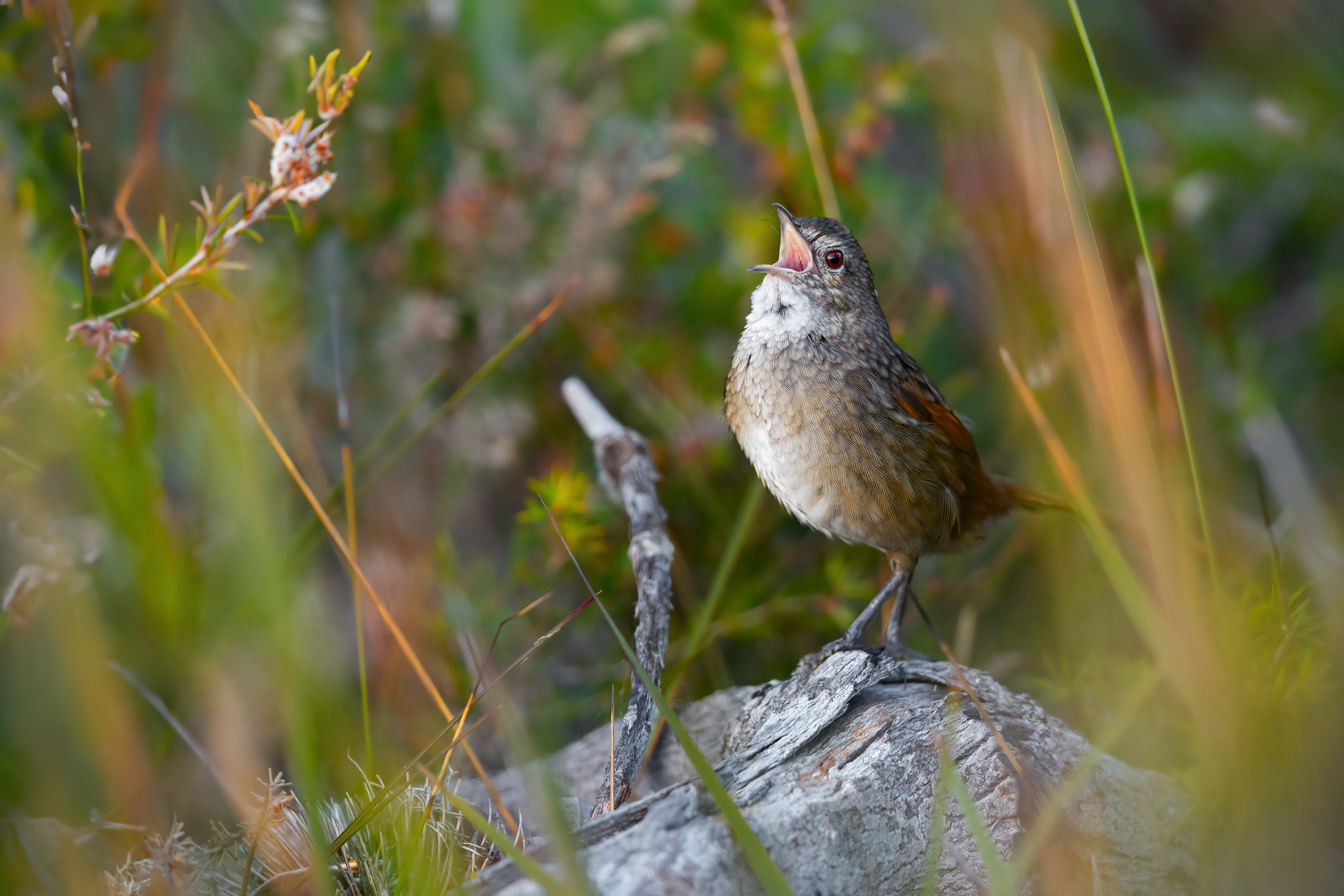
- Western bristlebird at the bottom.

Conservation status
- Endangered (IUCN 3.1)
- CITES Appendix II

Scientific classification
- Kingdom: Animalia
- Phylum: Chordata
- Class: Aves
- Order: Passeriformes
- Family: Dasyornithidae
- Genus: Dasyornis
- Species: D. longirostris

Binomial name
- Dasyornis longirostris Gould, 1841

= Western bristlebird =

Species of bird

The western bristlebird (Dasyornis longirostris) is a species of bird in the family Dasyornithidae. It is endemic to the coastal heaths of western Australia (east and west of Albany).

== Description ==
Adults are 18–22 cm long. Its plumage is grey-brown. It has a shorter tail than other bristlebirds, yet it is still quite long tail is rufous, with darker brown stripes. Its body is rufous with dark brown under-surface feathers, giving it a scalloped look. It has a red eye, and the front of neck and face is off-white.

Its natural habitat is temperate shrubland, particularly low, dense shrubland. It prefers coastal dunes and cliffs. It is threatened by habitat loss.

It can survive fire and relocate to the fire boundary, and will occupy regrowth when this becomes suitable. It occurs more rapidly in higher-rainfall areas.
