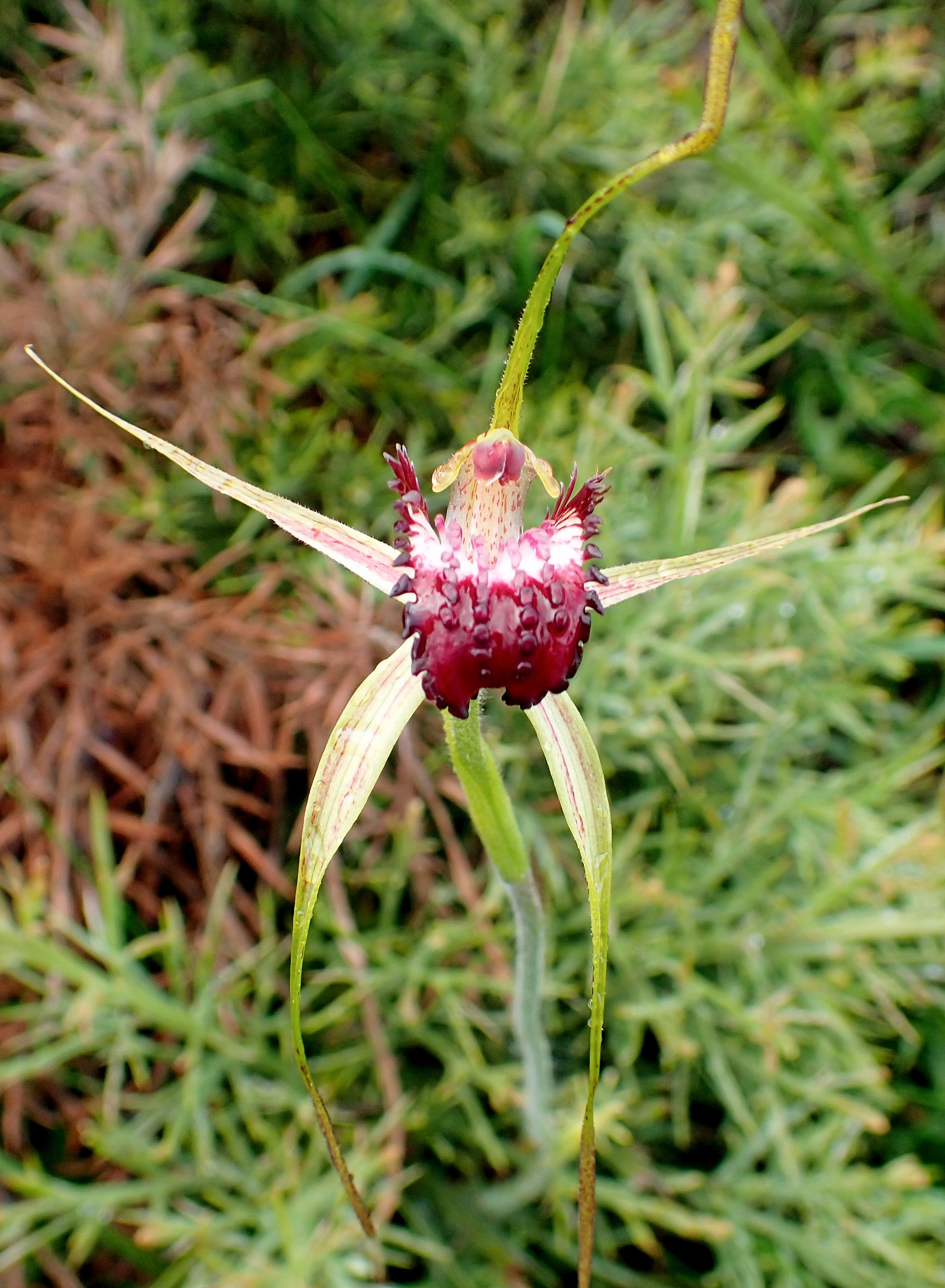
- In Leeuwin-Naturaliste National Park

Scientific classification
- Kingdom: Plantae
- Clade: Tracheophytes
- Clade: Angiosperms
- Clade: Monocots
- Order: Asparagales
- Family: Orchidaceae
- Subfamily: Orchidoideae
- Tribe: Diurideae
- Genus: Caladenia
- Species: C. applanata

Binomial name
- Caladenia applanata Hopper & A.P.Br.

Synonyms
- Arachnorchis applanata (Hopper & A.P.Br.) D.L.Jones & M.A.Clem.; Caladenia applanata N.Hoffman & A.P.Br. nom. inval.; Caladenia applanata Paczk. & A.R.Chapm. nom. inval.; Calonemorchis applanata (Hopper & A.P.Br.) Szlach. & Rutk.

= Caladenia applanata =

Species of orchid

Caladenia applanata is a species of flowering plant in the orchid family Orchidaceae and is endemic to the south-west of Western Australia. It has a single erect, hairy leaf and up to three flowers. The species was first described in 2001 by Stephen Hopper and Andrew Brown, and the description was published in Nuytsia. In the same paper, Hopper and Brown described two subspecies:

- Caladenia applanata subsp. applanata, has red, cream, green or yellow flowers.
- Caladenia applanata subsp. erubescens, has pink flowers.
