= South-west Corner Marine Park =

Marine protected area off Western Australia

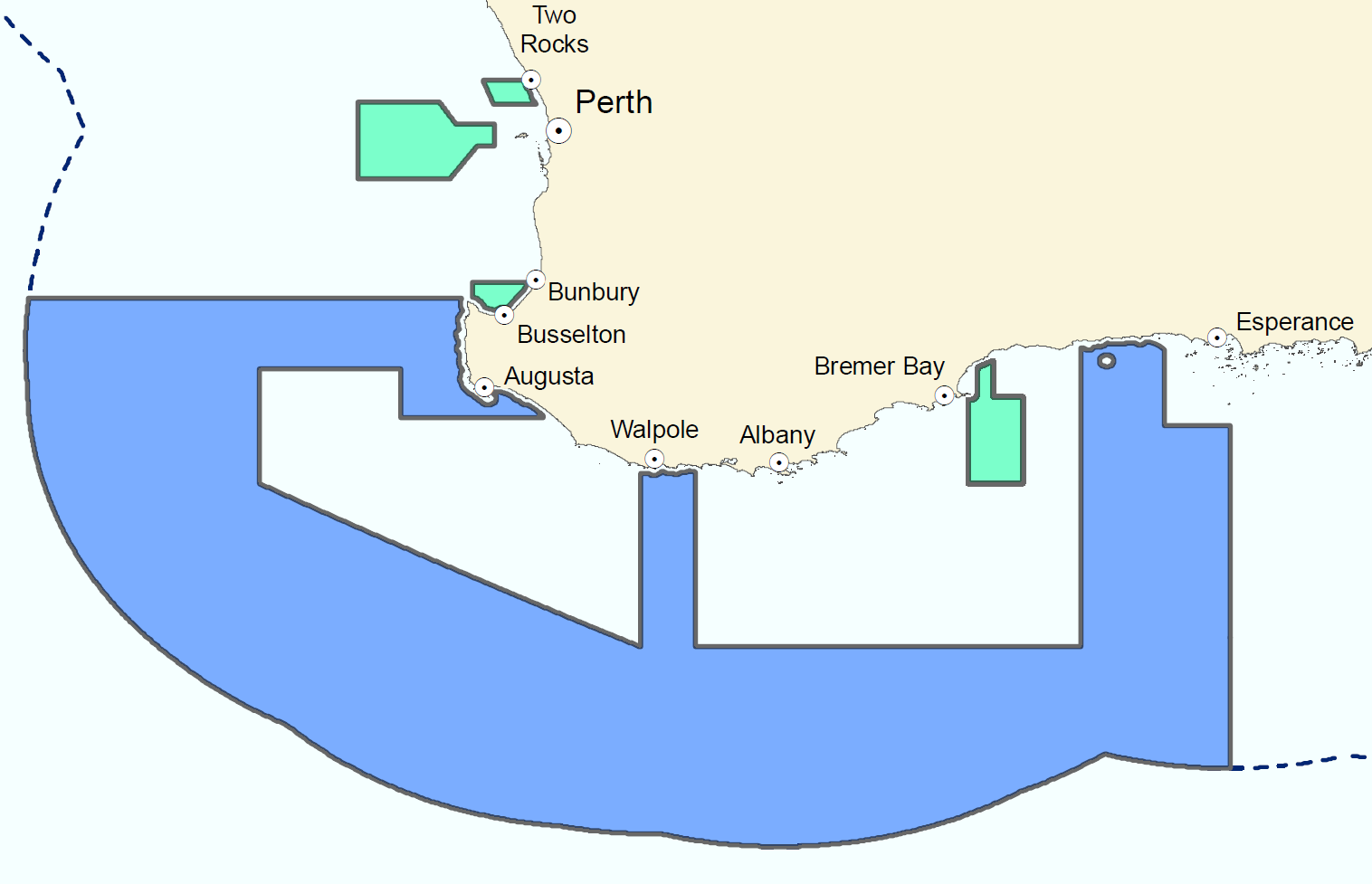
- The South-west Corner Marine Park, highlighted in blue, south of Western Australia's lower south west and southern coast
- Interactive map of South-west Corner Marine Park
- Location: Australia
- Coordinates: 34°06′39″S 121°01′25″E
- Area: 271,833 km^{2} (104,955 sq mi)
- Established: 14 December 2013
- Governing body: Director of National Parks
- Website: Official website

The South-west Corner Marine Park (formerly South-west Corner Commonwealth Marine Reserve) is a marine protected area on the lower south west and southern coast of Western Australia, one of 14 in the South-west Marine Parks Network.

It was gazetted on 14 December 2013 and was renamed on 11 October 2017.

== Features ==
The key ecological features of the marine park include:

- Albany Canyon
- Cape Mentelle upwelling
- Diamantina fracture zone
- Naturaliste Plateau
- Donnelly Banks

The marine park is located in Commonwealth waters (further away from the coastline) equivalent of the state marine park Ngari Capes Marine Park, which exists within Western Australian state jurisdiction.

== Major conservation values ==
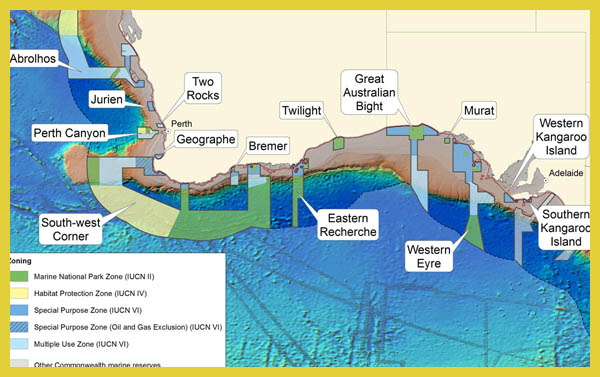
The South-west Commonwealth Marine Reserves Network, including the South-west Corner Commonwealth Marine Reserve

The South-west Corner Marine Park has the following major conservation values:

- Important migratory area for protected humpback whales and blue whales
- Important foraging areas for the:
  - threatened white shark
  - threatened Australian sea lion
  - threatened Indian yellow-nosed albatross and soft-plumaged petrel
  - migratory sperm whale
  - migratory flesh-footed shearwater, short-tailed shearwater and Caspian tern
- Seasonal calving habitat for the threatened southern right whale
- Representation of three provincial bioregions (the South-west Transition and Southern Province in the off-shelf area, and the South-west Shelf Province on the continental shelf) and two meso-scale bioregions (southern end of the Leeuwin-Naturaliste meso-scale bioregion and western and central parts of the Western Australia South Coast meso-scale bioregion)
- Six key ecological features:
  - Albany Canyon group (high productivity, feeding aggregations)
  - Cape Mentelle upwelling (high productivity)
  - Diamantina Fracture Zone (unique sea-floor feature likely to support deepwater communities characterised by high species diversity and endemism)
  - Naturaliste Plateau (unique sea-floor feature, likely to support deepwater communities characterised by high species diversity and endemism)
  - western rock lobster habitat (species with an important ecological role)
  - Commonwealth marine environment surrounding the Recherche Archipelago (high biodiversity, breeding and resting aggregations, including the most extensive areas of reef on the shelf within the South-west Marine Region)
- Representation of the Donnelly Banks, east of Augusta, characterised by higher productivity and including nursery habitats

== See also ==
- Protected areas managed by the Australian government
- Integrated Marine and Coastal Regionalisation of Australia
