= Dunsborough, Western Australia =

Dunsborough
- Town
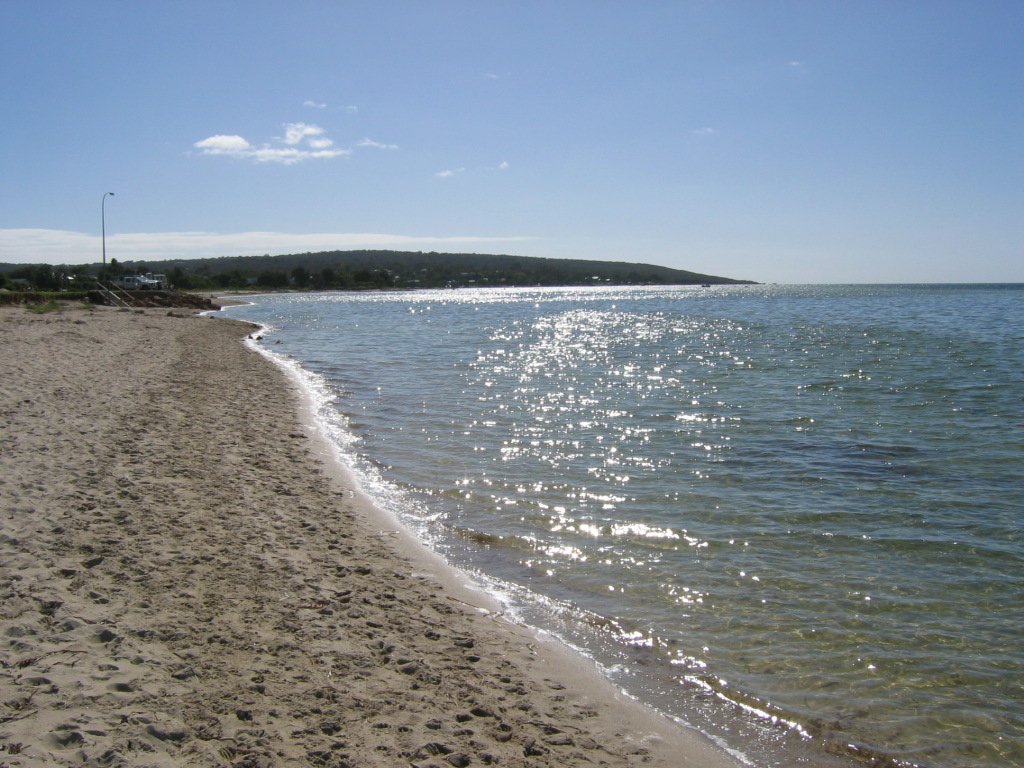
- Dunsborough Beach

- Interactive map of Dunsborough
- Coordinates: 33°37′0″S 115°6′0″E
- Country: Australia
- State: Western Australia
- LGA: City of Busselton
- Location: 245 km (152 mi) south west of Perth; 24 km (15 mi) west of Busselton; 37 km (23 mi) north of Margaret River
- Established: 1879

Government
  - State electorate: Vasse
  - Federal division: Forrest

Area
  - Total: 16.3 km^{2} (6.3 sq mi)
- Elevation: 10 m (33 ft)

Population
  - Total: 7,182 (UCL 2021)
- Postcode: 6281

Dunsborough is a coastal town in the South West region of Western Australia, 254 kilometres (158 mi) south of Perth, on the shores of Geographe Bay.

Dunsborough is a popular tourist destination for Western Australians; in 1999 it was voted the state's best tourist destination and in 2013 awarded the Top Tourism Award for Population Under 5,000. The town's location in the Margaret River Wine Region provides easy access to many wineries and breweries. The town is a favoured destination for annual school leavers in Western Australia, the other frequent choice being Rottnest Island.

== History ==
=== Indigenous prehistory ===
Prior to European colonisation, several distinct tribes inhabited the land and utilised the waters around Dunsborough. Those living on the coast were called Wardandi (sea people), and their language recorded as Burron Wongi. These Indigenous peoples referred to Dunsborough by the name of Quedjinup, which means "Place of Women". The name Quedjinup is retained for the district immediately to the south of Dunsborough, encompassing the Dunsborough Lakes and Biddle's Common housing developments which form part of the greater Dunsborough development zone.

Important local Aboriginal Heritage sites include:

- Caves Road – Naturaliste Road Roundabout: a large area, extending some 400m east of the current roundabout, within which many artefacts including flints, crystal quartz, and blades have been discovered. The artefacts discovered at this site have been dated between 8,000 and 12,000 years old. The site is on the Permanent Register of Aboriginal sites, and is protected under the West Australian Aboriginal Heritage Act (1972).
- The Seymour Street Camping Grounds: located between what was Seymour Street (now Cape Naturaliste Road) and Naturaliste Terrace, and again on the southern side of the wet ground within the playing fields, including part of the playing field itself and where the netball courts now stand.
- Dunn Bay Road Ceremonial Ground: a reported "law ground" that was a ceremonial meeting site that brought traditional Wardandi people together.

=== British settlement ===
The modern town is named after the nearby Dunn Bay, which was named after Captain Richard Dalling Dunn under whom Governor James Stirling had served in the Hibernia and the Armide in 1810–11. Land for a townsite was set aside here in the late 1830s, and there is a recorded whale fishery at "Dunsbro" in 1850. When Dunsborough first appeared on a map in 1839 it was spelt "Dunnsbro" but the extra "n" seems to have disappeared by 1850, and the spelling of "bro" was amended to "borough" when the name was gazetted on 29 April 1879.

In 1860, the Seymour family who worked for the Castle Rock Whaling Company built the Seymour Homestead. It would later be moved to Millbrook Farm in Yallingup. In the 1920s the family built Seymour's Cottages, which were among the first holiday houses in the area; they were also relocated to Millbrook Farm. A general store was opened in 1925 and the town's first bakery was established in 1930. By the 1950s, Dunsborough's population consisted of about forty families; 1957 saw the opening of the Old Dunsborough Hall and Dunsborough Primary School opened in 1963. Surfing became popular in the 1960s and wine tourism in the nearby Margaret River was emerging by the mid-1980s. The population of the town began to significantly increase from the late 1970s onwards.

== Tourism and culture ==
Dunsborough's beaches, restaurants, cafes, and boutique shops attract tourists. The town is also near Meelup Regional Park (including Meelup Beach), Cape Naturaliste and its lighthouse (which are in the Leeuwin-Naturaliste National Park and part of the Cape to Cape Track), Ngari Capes Marine Park (containing the dive wreck of HMAS Swan), and the Margaret River Wine Region.

The CinefestOZ film festival stages some of its screenings and events in Dunsborough in late August each year.

== Transport ==
Caves Road and Cape Naturaliste Road are major roads in the area, linked by a roundabout. Dunsborough is serviced by Busselton's public bus service route 815 run by Swan Transit South West (TransBusselton). South West Coach Lines and Transwa coach services also run services to Dunsborough for connections to other south west towns and Perth.

== Education ==
Dunsborough is served by one government school, Dunsborough Primary School, and two private schools, Our Lady of the Cape Primary School and Dunsborough Christian College (a co-educational primary and secondary college in Quedjinup).

== Events ==
- Dunsborough Arts Festival and Sculpture By The Bay
- Dunsborough Bay Fun Run
- Dunsborough Lions Easter Fair
- XTERRA Dunsborough

== Notable people ==
- Mahli Beardman, cricketer (born 2005)
