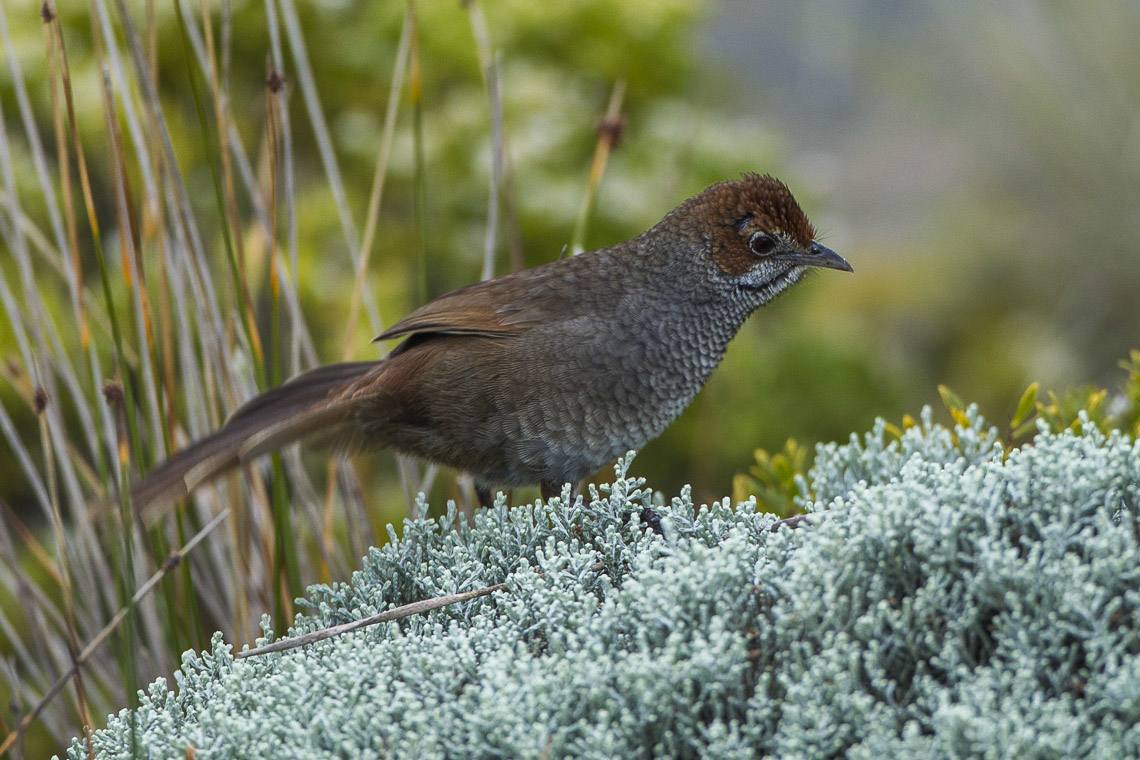
- Rufous bristlebird (Dasyornis broadbenti)

Scientific classification
- Kingdom: Animalia
- Phylum: Chordata
- Class: Aves
- Order: Passeriformes
- Superfamily: Meliphagoidea
- Family: Dasyornithidae; Sibley & Ahlquist, 1985
- Genus: Dasyornis; Vigors & Horsfield, 1827

Type species
- Dasyornis australis Vigors & Horsfield, 1827

Species
- Dasyornis brachypterus Dasyornis broadbenti Dasyornis longirostris †Dasyornis walterbolesi

= Bristlebird =

Family of birds

The bristlebirds are a family of passerine birds, Dasyornithidae. There are three species in one genus, Dasyornis. The family is endemic to the south-east coastal regions and south-west corner of Australia, but each species occupies a mostly disjunct and restricted range of its own. They are primarily ground-scampering, though they can fly short distances, and it is primarily in dense coastal scrub that they forage on foot for their food. They are also more often heard than seen, having sweet and resonant calls with a metallica character; two of the three species are endangered.

The family now comprises three species: eastern, rufous and western bristlebirds. At least three subspecies have been identified in the family: the critically endangered northern subspecies monoides of the eastern bristlebird; the likely extinct dune-dwelling litoralis of the rufous bristlebird; and the newly-discovered subspecies caryochrous of the rufous bristlebird, which occurs in open eucalyptus forest with dense understorey in the Otway range.

The genus Dasyornis was sometimes placed in the Acanthizidae or, as a subfamily, Dasyornithinae, along with the Acanthizinae and Pardalotinae, within an expanded Pardalotidae, before being elevated to full family level by Christidis & Boles (2008).

== Taxonomy and systematics ==
The subfamily Dasyornithinae in the family Acanthizidae was introduced in 1985 by the ornithologists Charles G. Sibley and Jon E. Ahlquist. The subfamily is now considered as a separate family Dasyornithidae.

Taxa accepted or described by Schodde & Mason (1999) include, with their estimated conservation status:

Genus Dasyornis – Vigors & Horsfield, 1827 – three species
| Common name | Scientific name and subspecies | Range | Size and ecology | IUCN status and estimated population |
|---|---|---|---|---|
| Eastern bristlebird | Dasyornis brachypterus (Latham, 1801) Two subspecies: D. b. brachypterus; D. b. monoides | Australia. | Size: Habitat: Diet: | VU |
| Rufous bristlebird | Dasyornis broadbenti (McCoy, 1867) Three subspecies: D. b. broadbenti; D. b. caryochrous; D. b. litoralis | coastal southwestern Western Australia, southeastern South Australia and southwestern Victoria. | Size: Habitat: Diet: | LC |
| Western bristlebird | Dasyornis longirostris Gould, 1841 | western Australia | Size: Habitat: Diet: | EN |

Once placed within various Northern Hemisphere lineages (such as Old World warblers or Old World flycatchers), the Dasyornithidae's closest relatives are now known to be Australian endemics such as the pardalotes and honeyeaters. Although their exact position within the Australasian basal lineages of passerines is not fully resolved, Marki et al.’s 2017 study, the first to sample and sequence molecular data for all three species of bristlebirds, placed them within the ecologically diverse infra-order Meliphagides (formerly known as Meliphagoidea). This lineage consists of five families: Maluridae (fairywrens and allies), Acanthizidae (thornbills and gerygones), Meliphagidae (honeyeaters), Pardalotidae (pardalotes) and Dasyornithidae (bristlebirds). While other families within this grouping are highly speciose (e.g.: the Meliphagidae (honeyeaters) family, with 187 species), Dasyornis broadbenti, D. brachypterus and D. longirostris are the only three known species of bristlebirds. Marki et al. found strong support for D. broadbenti as sister lineage to D. brachypterus and D. longirostris, having diverged from its relatives in the mid-Miocene (ca.13 Mya), with D. brachypterus and D. longirostris diverging in the early Pliocene (ca. 5 Mya). They infer from this that genetic divergences within the family may be greater than their similar morphologies might suggest, and urge denser sampling to explore the possibility of overlooked cryptic species.

== Description ==
Bristlebirds are long-tailed, sedentary, ground-frequenting birds. They vary in length from about 17 cm to 27 cm, with the Eastern bristlebird the smallest, and the Rufous bristlebird the largest, species in the family. Their colouring is mainly grey with various shades of brown—ranging from olive-brown through chestnut and rufous—on the plumage of the upperparts. The grey plumage of the underparts or the mantle is marked by pale dappling or scalloping. The common name of the family is derived from the presence of prominent rictal bristles: three stiff, hair-like feathers curving downwards on either side of the gape. This feature distinguishes them from the scrub-birds, to which they are similar in appearance but not closely related. The bristles—which are conspicuous in many birds that (like the bristlebirds) forage for insects in dark locations—may serve a tactile function in locating or manipulating prey.

== Distribution and habitat ==
Eastern bristlebirds were first seen by Europeans in Port Jackson (Sydney Harbour) when Latham first described the species for science in 1801. According to Gould, they were "to be found throughout New South Wales in all places suitable to its habits, although, from the recluse nature of its disposition, it is a species familiar to few, even of those who have long been resident in the colony." Gould's description of the Eastern bristlebird's habitat as "reed-beds and thickets, particularly such as are overgrown with creepers and vegetation" captures the density of the coastal heath scrub and grassland favoured by Dasyornithidae, although not the fire-dependence of these environments, which require regular burning to prevent the trees shading out the grass component.

After two centuries of European colonisation, two of the three species of bristlebirds are endangered (see Status and Conservation below), and all have restricted and disjunct ranges. Their distributions are non-overlapping, with the Western bristlebird the most specialised/localised/isolated—it inhabits only a tiny area of dense heathland on the south-west coast of Western Australia. On the east coast, the Eastern bristlebird occupies a wider range of habitats: relict pockets of far south-east Queensland and northern New South Wales, and coastal fringes south of Sydney to the Victorian border. The Rufous bristlebird's range is dense coastal shrubland and heathland in far south-west Victoria and extreme eastern South Australia. The least-shy member of the family, the newly discovered subspecies caryochrous, occurs in open eucalyptus forest with dense understorey in the Otway range, but is also found in car parks, tracks and gardens along the edges of its dense habitat (hence, perhaps, its reputation for boldness).

== Behaviour and ecology ==
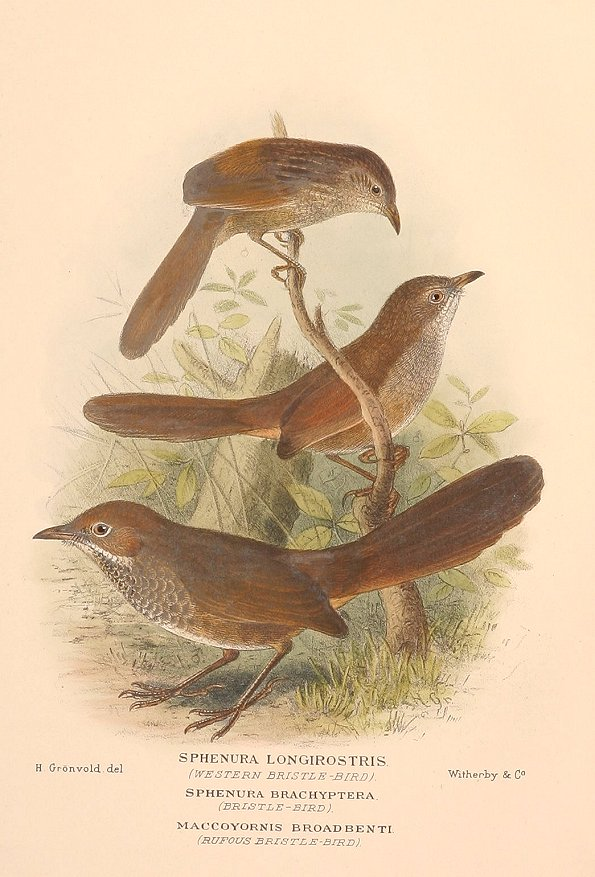
Western, eastern and rufous bristlebirds

Often described as shy, elusive or secretive, they scamper through the thickest vegetation on strong legs, sometimes with their tails held partly erect. They preferentially run to avoid danger, but are capable of flying short distances on their short rounded wings. They are more often heard than seen, singing in sweet and resonant voices with a distinctive metallic character. It is usually the male that sings. The song is thought to be territorial in nature and is often made from on top of a log or shrub to better carry in the air. Diurnal, nothing is known of their roosting behaviour except that it is in dense thickets.

They generally occur in pairs, but their social structure has not been studied closely. Most of the food is found by foraging on the ground. Birds forage in pairs, making small contact calls to keep in touch, and constantly flicking their tails whilst moving. The major part of the diet is composed of insects and seeds. Spiders and worms are also taken, and birds have been observed drinking nectar as well.

The breeding behaviour of bristlebirds is poorly known. They are thought to mostly be monogamous and defend a territory against others of the same species. The Western bristlebird breeds July–October, the two eastern species between August and February. All are single-brooded, and eastern and Rufous bristlebirds will lay replacement clutches if the first one is lost, an important factor in the success of captive breeding programs being undertaken in Queensland for the critically endangered northern subspecies monoides of the Eastern bristlebird.

The nest is constructed by the female in low vegetation and is a large ovoid dome with a side entrance with finer grasses for lining. Two eggs are laid, white or dullish whitish-brown or pink dotted with purplish-brown spots. As far as is known only the female incubates the clutch, for a period of between sixteen and twenty-one days. Both sexes feed the young. The nestling stage is known to be long, eighteen to twenty-one days.

== Status and conservation ==
With two of the three recognised species already on the IUCN Red List, the Dasyornithidae are increasingly vulnerable to habitat destruction by ever more fierce and frequent bush fires. The Rufous bristlebird D. broadbenti is still comparatively common in its core areas of western Victoria and far south-east South Australia, but the ranges of the other two species have contracted since European settlement to relict populations found almost entirely within national parks and reserves with appropriate weed eradication and fire management regimes. The latter are essential for bristlebirds: with their small rounded wings they are poor flyers and prefer to run than to fly. Large and unchecked bushfires can cause local extinctions, compounding population fragmentation. Recent research suggests total avoidance of fire in the management of Western and Rufous bristlebird populations. Eastern bristlebirds require a more delicate balance with some degree of burning needed to promote regeneration of the grasslands they favour but too much destroying both habitat and potential refugia where populations can shelter until vegetation recovers. Habitat loss since European settlement from land-clearing for agriculture and extensive housing development along coastal strips in more recent times also threatens bristlebird survival. The western subspecies litoralis of the Rufous Bristlebird, once found in dense impenetrable shrub-land on the coastal dunes of extreme south-west Western Australia is probably extinct.
