= Huzzas =

Surf break off Gracetown, Western Australia

Huzzas (also referred to as Huzzawouie huzzas) is the name of a surf break off Gracetown, Western Australia.

It is in proximity to a number of other surf breaks that are located near to Cowaramup bay and Gracetown.
