= Supertubes =

Surf break in Western Australia

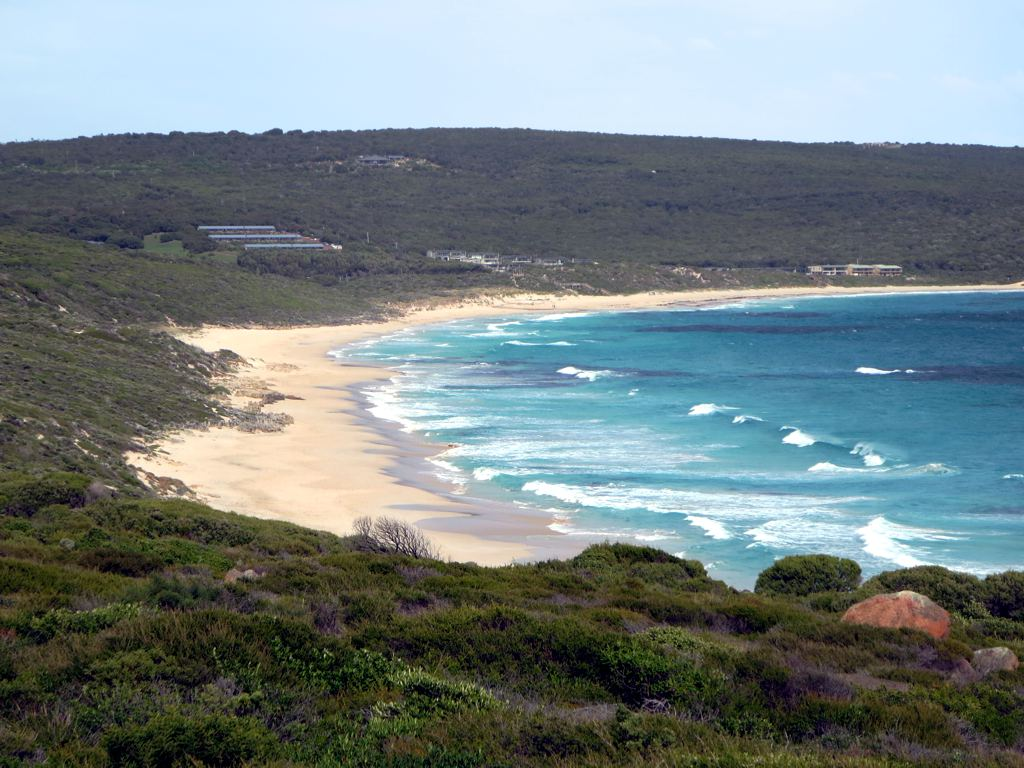
Smiths Beach in Leeuwin-Naturaliste National Park near Yallingup, Western Australia, is a popular sand break surfing spot.

Supertubes (also known as Supers), is a popular surf break found on the south-west coast of Western Australia. It is located on Smiths Beach, which is near the town of Yallingup.

Supertubes has hosted many local competitions over the years. Many professional bodyboarders and surfers have also been seen at this spot. The wave itself is about 50m out on a shallow reef. The left-hander, is a heavy barrel, that is only a very short ride, but is aesthetically pleasing. The right-hander though, is a long barrel that often closes out.
