= Cape Freycinet =

Point in Western Australia

Coordinates: 34°05′S 114°59′E

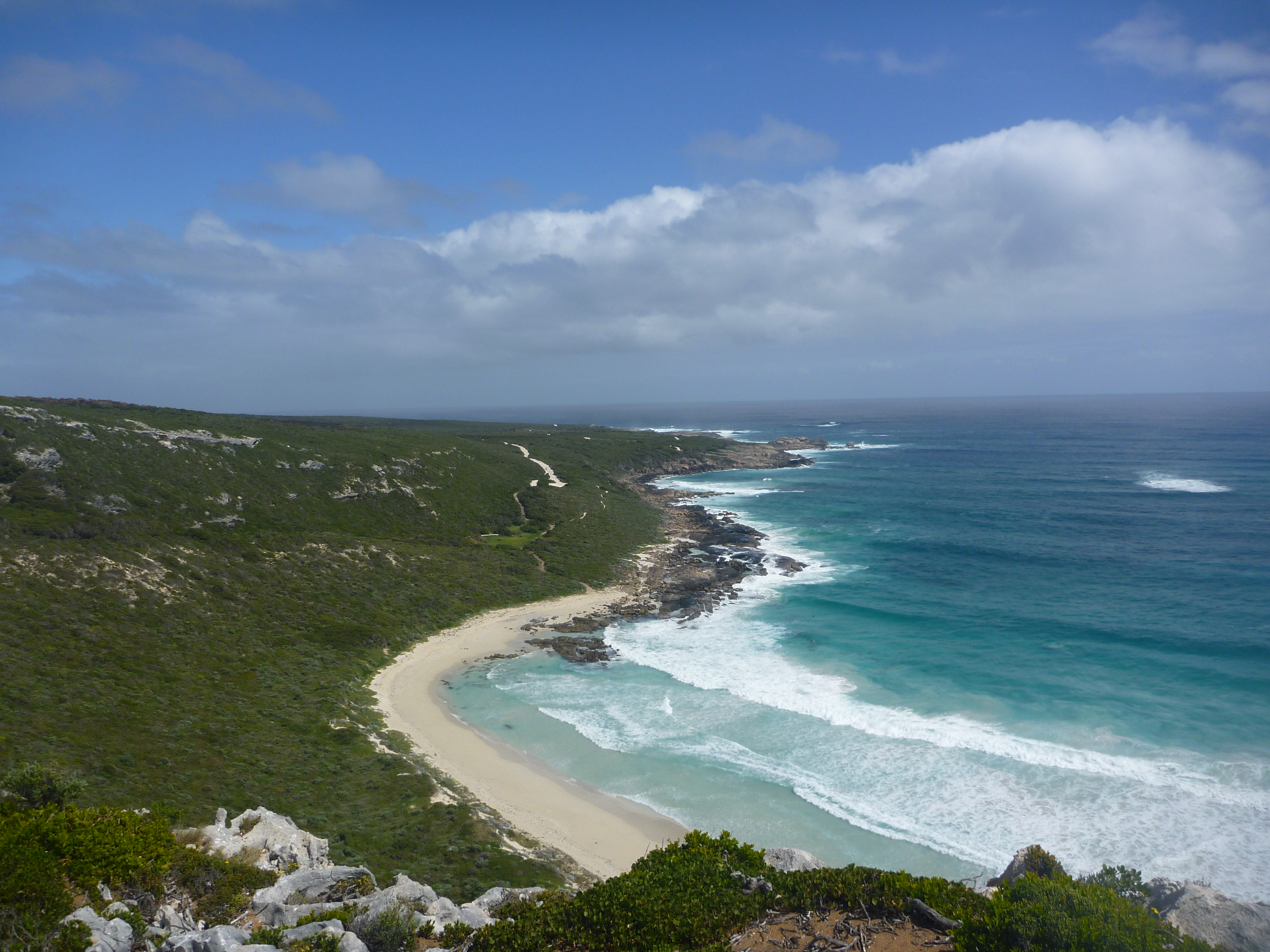
Cape Freycinet and Contos Beach from the Cape to Cape Track

Cape Freycinet is a point on the coast of Western Australia between Cape Leeuwin and Cape Naturaliste in the southwest of the state. It is in the Shire of Augusta-Margaret River, part of Leeuwin-Naturaliste National Park. Not far from the Lake Cave it is approached from Caves Road along Conto Road.

== History ==
The cape was named in 1803 after the Freycinet family, which had two brothers – Louis Claude and Louis Henri de Saulces de Freycinet – on the Baudin expedition to Australia. It is one of several French-named capes in Western Australia.

The late Leslie Marchant in his posthumous publication on French names in Western Australia insists that it is not a cape, but a point – and names it Point Freycinet counter to the established name listed by Geoscience Australia database.

== See also ==
- Cape Clairault
- Cape Mentelle
- Hamelin Bay

== Sources ==
- Edward Duyker François Péron: An Impetuous Life: Naturalist and Voyager, Miegunyah/MUP, Melb., 2006, ISBN 978-0-522-85260-8
- Fornasiero, Jean; Monteath, Peter and West-Sooby, John. Encountering Terra Australis: the Australian voyages of Nicholas Baudin and Matthew Flinders, Kent Town, South Australia, Wakefield Press, 2004. ISBN 1-86254-625-8
- Frank Horner, The French Reconnaissance: Baudin in Australia 1801—1803, Melbourne University Press, Melbourne, 1987 ISBN 0-522-84339-5.
- Marchant, Leslie R. (2004). French Napoleonic Placenames of the South West Coast. Greenwood: R.I.C. Publications. ISBN 1-74126-094-9.
