= Cape Naturaliste Lighthouse =

Lighthouse in Western Australia

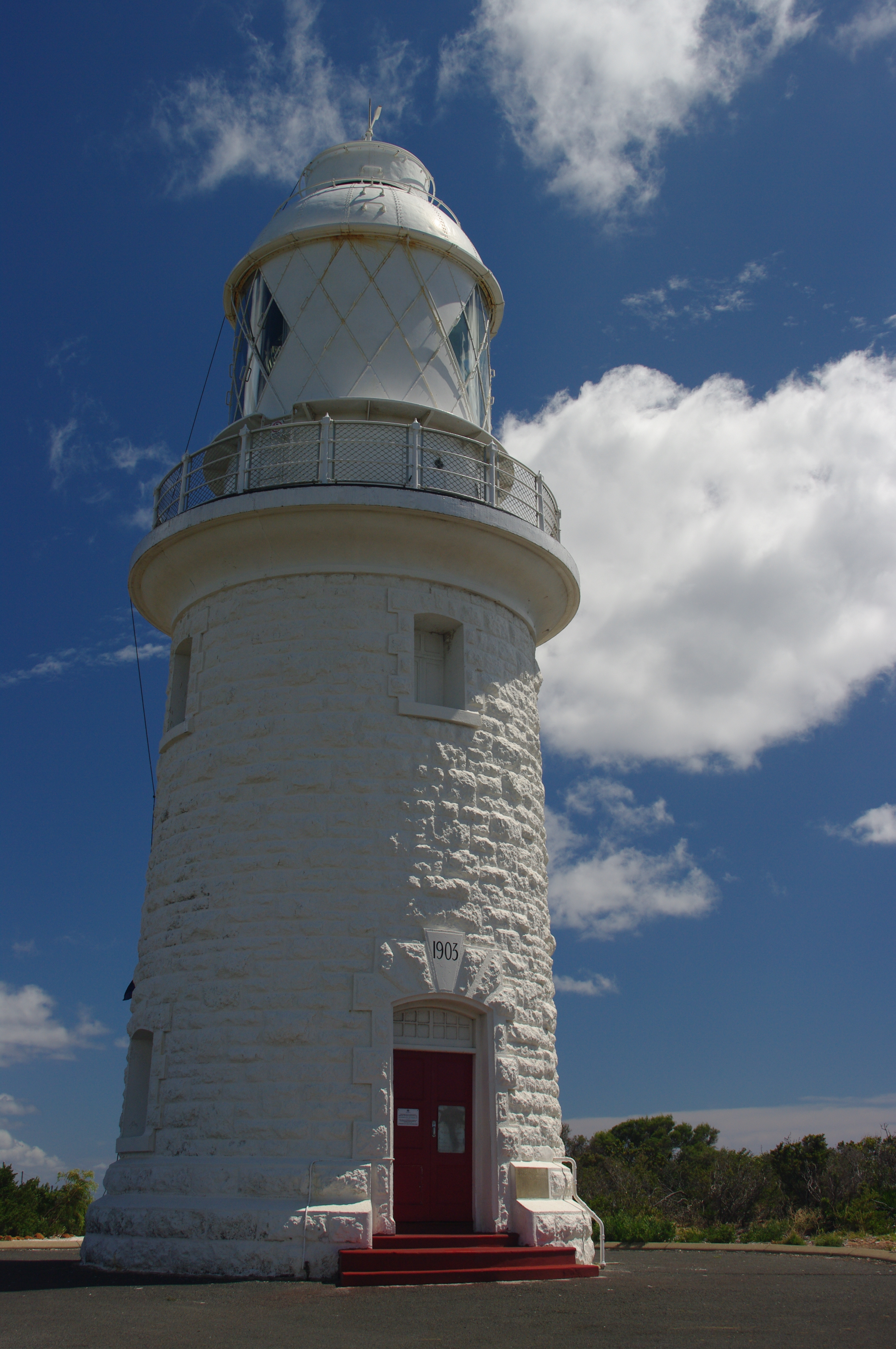
- Cape Naturaliste Lighthouse
- Location: Cape Naturaliste, Western Australia, Australia
- Coordinates: 33°32′14.4″S 115°01′07.3″E

Tower
- Constructed: 1904
- Construction: Limestone tower
- Height: 20 m (66 ft)
- Shape: Cylindrical tower with balcony and lantern
- Markings: White tower and lantern
- Operator: Australian Maritime Safety Authority

Light
- Focal height: 123 m (404 ft)
- Lens: 1st order Chance Brothers Fresnel lens
- Intensity: 930,000 cd
- Range: 25 nmi (46 km)
- Characteristic: Fl W (2) 10 s

Western Australia Heritage Register
- Official name: Cape Naturaliste Lighthouse and Quarters
- Designated: 17 April 2003
- Reference no.: 2914

Cape Naturaliste, in the south west of Western Australia, is the site of a lighthouse which was activated in 1904. It was automated in 1978, but remained staffed with a lighthouse keeper until 1996.

It is a 20-metre-high (66 ft) cylindrical tower built of limestone that still uses its original first order Fresnel lens made by Chance Brothers. The light characteristic is "Fl. (2) 10 s", i.e. a group of two flashes every ten seconds, the focal plane is at 123 metres (404 ft) above sea level. Another precious lens optic is displayed there, the second order Fresnel lens of the Jarman Island Light, as well as the original Great Sandy Islands beacon. Both items were originally used on the Pilbara coast further north.

The lighthouse is constructed of limestone quarried from nearby Bunker Bay, which was also known as the Quarries.

== See also ==
- List of lighthouses in Australia
