= Cape Mentelle =

Headland in Western Australia

Coordinates: 33°57′43″S 114°58′50″E

Cape Mentelle is a limestone headland on the Indian Ocean coast of south-western Western Australia. It is within the Leeuwin-Naturaliste National Park, just north of the mouth of the Margaret River and 9 km (5.6 mi) west of the town of Margaret River. It lies on the Leeuwin-Naturaliste Ridge, halfway between Cape Naturaliste 50 km (31 mi) to the north, and Cape Leeuwin 50 km (31 mi) to the south, on the route of the Cape to Cape walking track.

== History ==
The cape was named on 4 February 1803 by French navigator Nicolas Baudin, on his expedition to Australia, after Edme Mentelle (1730–1815), a French geographer, historian and cartographer. It has given its name to a well known Margaret River winery, Cape Mentelle Vineyards.

== See also ==
- Cape Clairault
- Cape Freycinet
