= Yallingup, Western Australia =

Yallingup
- Town
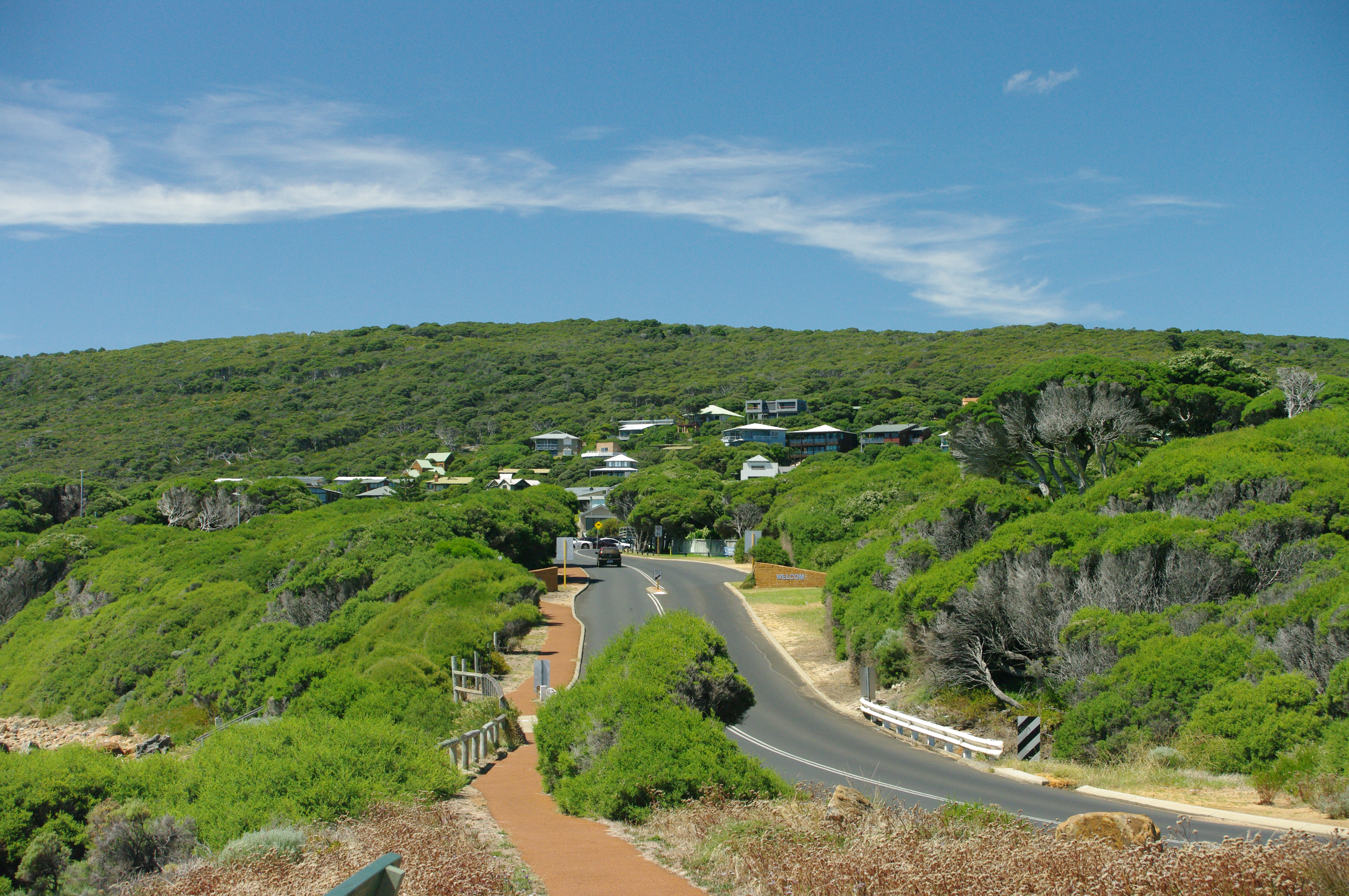
- Yallingup town

- Interactive map of Yallingup
- Coordinates: 33.64°S 115.03°E
- Country: Australia
- State: Western Australia
- LGA: City of Busselton
- Location: 256 km (159 mi) S of Perth; 34 km (21 mi) W of Busselton; 37 km (23 mi) N of Margaret River

Government
  - State electorate: Vasse
  - Federal division: Forrest

Area
  - Total: 75.3 km^{2} (29.1 sq mi)
- Elevation: 53 m (174 ft)

Population
  - Total: 1,195 (SAL 2021)
- Postcode: 6282

Yallingup is a town in the South West region of Western Australia, 256 kilometres (159 mi) south of Perth. Yallingup is a popular tourist destination because of its beaches and limestone caves, and proximity to Leeuwin-Naturaliste National Park.

== History and industry ==
Yallingup's name means "Place of caves" in the local Aboriginal Wardandi dialect, with "yal" meaning "large hole"; the name has been rumoured to mean "place of love" due to the popularity of weddings and honeymoons in the town. After its caves were discovered by European settlers in 1899, Yallingup became popular with tourists, and its early infrastructure was photographed by Coyarre. There was a state primary school in Yallingup from 1905 to 1963; the site now contains a Steiner school. Around 1920, the Yallingup Hall, which was previously a school building in Karridale, was moved to the townsite and reassembled. Tourism and viticulture are Yallingup's primary industries.

== Geography and climate ==
Yallingup is located 256 kilometres (159 mi) south of Perth and 34 kilometres (21 mi) west of Busselton in Western Australia's South West region. Yallingup experiences a Mediterranean climate (Köppen climate classification Csa/Csb). Residents and visitors experience moderate temperatures, with an average maximum temperature of 22 °C (72 °F) and a minimum of 11 °C (52 °F).

== Tourist attractions ==
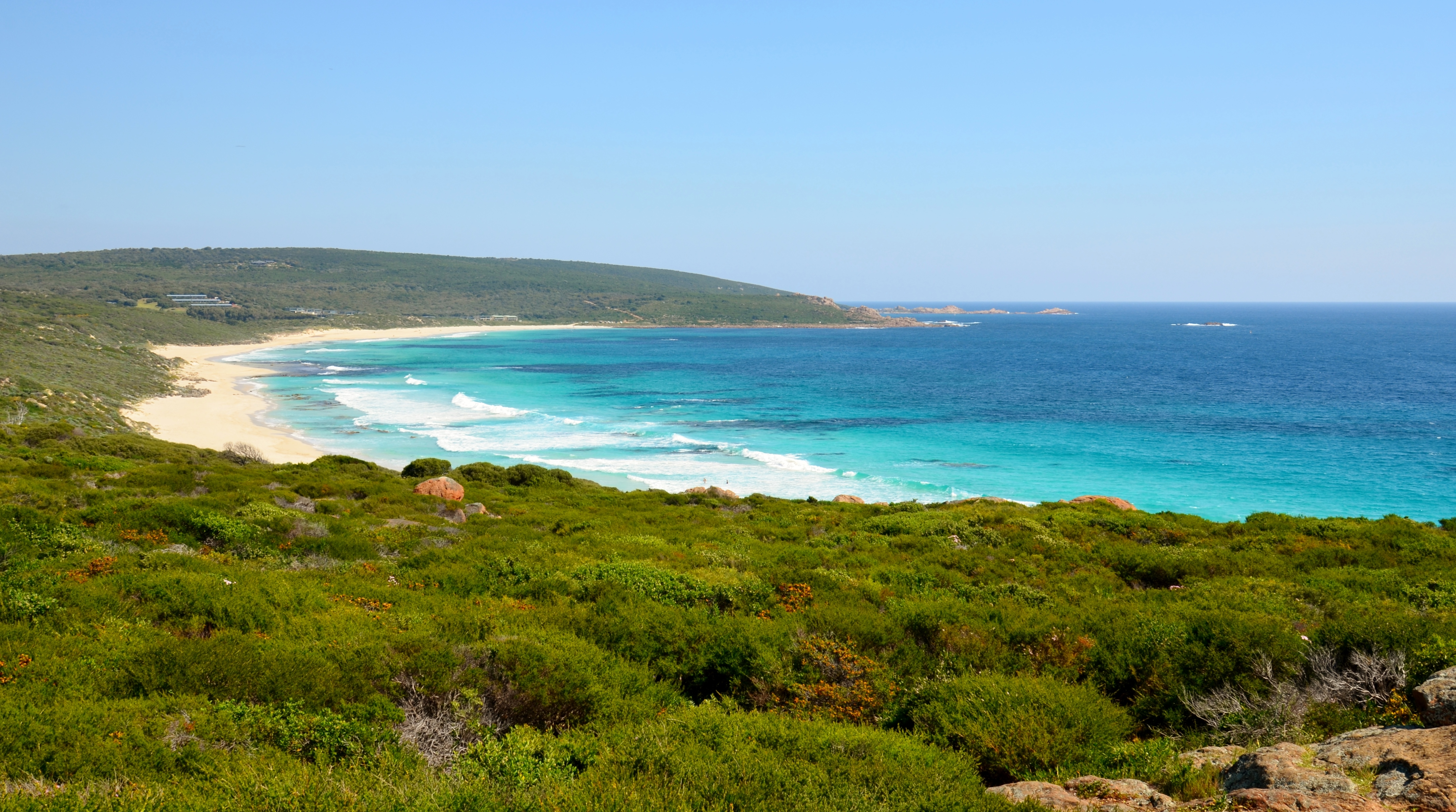
Smiths Beach and Canal Rocks

The beaches of Yallingup, such as Three Bears, Yallingup, Smiths Beach (including Supertubes), and Injidup, are well known surfing locations, and are also suitable for fishing.

The Leeuwin-Naturaliste National Park houses Canal Rocks, a coastal rock formation, and limestone caves, such as Ngilgi Cave (formerly called Yallingup Cave).

The Cape to Cape Track runs across the beach to the west of the town and Yallingup is one of the few towns located along the track.

Injidup Beach contains Injidup Natural Spa, also known as Wyadup Spa, a natural rock pool.

== Smiths Beach ==
Smiths Beach has been the site of multiple extended proposals for development that have eventuated in political scandals. A Smiths Beach development project was a subject of a Corruption and Crime Commission investigation in 2007, investigating former WA Premier Brian Burke and lobbyists Julian Grill and Noel Crichton-Browne, who lobbied the state government on behalf of developers. The Corruption and Crime Commission report concluded the Canal Rocks developer secretly paid more than $47,000 to candidates including Shire of Busselton Councillors Anne Ryan, Phillippa Reid, and John Triplett, in the Shire Council election and by-election in 2005. Funds were channelled to candidates via a local action group, in an attempt to delay revision to the town planning scheme so the development could be assessed under less strict conditions.

== Flora and fauna ==
=== Flora ===
Yallingup is home to many different types of bushland and wildlife. The surrounding area is made up of wet sclerophyllous forest. Yallingup is a biodiversity hotspot that includes the Mediterranean forests, woodlands, and scrub ecoregions of Western Australia.

=== Fauna ===
The Yallingup region is home to a diverse range of species including the western grey kangaroo and over 70 types of birds, creating a healthy ecosystem for the many mammals, reptiles and aviaries. To maintain wildlife population the Western Australia government has placed sanctuary zones and nature reserves where minimal human life and impact can occur.

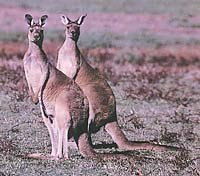
Western grey kangaroos

== See also ==
- Margaret River (wine region)
- Flora of Australia
