= SS Akaroa =

UK steam ocean liner

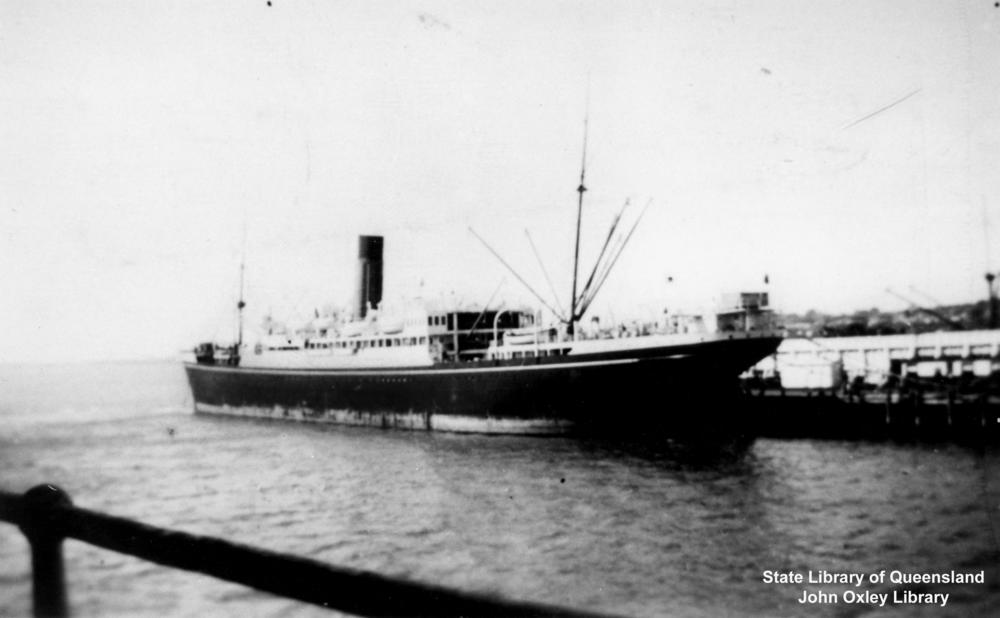
- Akaroa in New Plymouth in 1934

History

United Kingdom
- Name: 1914: Euripides; 1932: Akaroa
- Namesake: 1914: Euripides; 1932: Akaroa
- Owner: 1914: George Thompson & Co Ltd; 1932: Shaw, Savill & Albion Line
- Operator: 1914: Aberdeen Line; 1929: White Star Line; 1932: Shaw, Savill & Albion Line
- Port of registry: 1914: Aberdeen; 1932: Southampton
- Route: 1914: London – Cape Town – Brisbane; 1923: Southampton – Australia; 1927: Liverpool – Australia; 1932: Southampton – Curaçao – Panama Canal – New Zealand
- Builder: Harland and Wolff
- Yard number: 439
- Launched: 29 January 1914
- Completed: 6 June 1914
- Refit: 1932, 1945
- Identification: UK official number 133648; pennant number A14 (1914–17); code letters JFRC (until 1933); call sign MSE (by 1918); call sign GMLP (by 1930)
- Fate: Scrapped 1954

General characteristics
- Tonnage: 1914: 14,947 GRT, 9,399 NRT; 1932: 15,128 GRT, 9,461 NRT; 1945: 15,320 GRT
- Displacement: 25,000 tons
- Length: 550.7 ft (167.9 m) p/p; 569 ft (173 m) o/a
- Beam: 67.4 ft (20.5 m)
- Draught: 32 ft 11 in (10.03 m)
- Depth: 44.1 ft (13.4 m)
- Decks: 3
- Installed power: 1,401 NHP
- Propulsion: 2 × triple-expansion steam engines; 1 × low-pressure steam turbine; 3 × screws
- Speed: 15 knots (28 km/h)
- Capacity: 1914: 140 first class berths; 334 third class berths; 750 steerage class berths; 1932: 200 cabin class berths; 1946: 190 cabin class berths; 1914: 245,593 cubic feet (6,954 m^{3}) refrigerated cargo; 1932: 442,680 cubic feet (12,535 m^{3}) refrigerated cargo
- Sensors & processing systems: wireless direction finding (by 1930); echo sounding device (from 1934); gyrocompass (from 1936)
- Armament: (as DEMS)

SS Akaroa was a UK steam ocean liner and refrigerated cargo ship. She was launched in 1914 in Ireland as Euripides for Aberdeen Line. When new, she was the largest ship in the Aberdeen Line fleet.

In the First World War she was an Allied troop ship. From 1929, White Star Line managed her. In 1932 Euripides passed to Shaw, Savill & Albion Line who had her refitted and renamed her Akaroa. She survived the Second World War and was scrapped in Belgium in 1954.

Aberdeen Line named some of its ships after classical Greek people and events. Euripides was a tragedian in Classical Athens in the fifth century BC.

Shaw, Savill & Albion names some of its ships after places in New Zealand. Akaroa is a small town on South Island.

== Building ==
Harland and Wolff built Euripides on its slipway number nine in Belfast, launching her on 29 January 1914 and completing her on 6 June.

Euripides looked similar to her Aberdeen Line running mates Themistocles and Demosthenes. However, with a length of 550.7 ft (167.9 m) between perpendiculars and beam of 67.4 ft (20.5 m) Euripides was 50 ft (15 m) longer and 5.4 ft (1.6 m) broader. As built, her tonnages were 14,947 GRT, 9,399 NRT and about 25,000 tons displacement, and she was the largest ship in Aberdeen Line's fleet.

Euripides had a double bottom for the full length of her hull. Her hull was divided into watertight compartments, so that she could remain afloat if any two were flooded.

In 1914 newspapers reported that Euripides was built with two classes of passenger accommodation: first and third. First class was on the bridge deck, boat deck, main deck and awning deck. Third class was on the poop and tween deck. However, other sources claim she was built with berths for three classes: 140 first class, 334 third class and 750 steerage. Her holds were refrigerated and had capacity for 245,593 cubic feet (6,954 m^{3}) of cargo. They had a total of seven hatches, served by 19 winches.

Like Demosthenes, Euripides had three screws. A pair of four-cylinder triple-expansion steam engines drove her port and starboard screws. Exhaust steam from their low-pressure cylinders powered a low-pressure steam turbine that drove her middle screw. The combined power output of her three engines was rated at 1,401 NHP and gave her a service speed of 15 knots (28 km/h).

George Thompson & Co registered Euripides at Aberdeen. Her UK official number was 133648 and her code letters were JFRC.

== Maiden voyage ==
Aberdeen Line ran scheduled services between London and Australia via South Africa. Euripides left London on her maiden voyage on 1 July 1914, called at Plymouth on 2 July and Cape Town on 20 July.

On 28 July the First World War began as Euripides was crossing the Indian Ocean. She called at Albany, Western Australia on 4 August, Melbourne on 13 August and Sydney on 15 August, and reached Brisbane on 24 August.

When Euripides reached Sydney, the Daily Commercial News and Shipping List hailed her as "a palatial vessel" but noted that she was already listed to be requisitioned as a troop ship.

== First World War ==
On 26 August Euripides was requisitioned as the troop ship HMAT Euripides, with the pennant number A14.

Euripides embarked elements of the First Australian Imperial Force at Brisbane on 24 September 1914 and at Sydney on 18–29 October. On 1 November she joined a convoy in King George Sound, Western Australia.

From 1914 until 1917 Euripides made seven voyages carrying troops from Australia to Great Britain. Two of the trips in 1915 were returning severely wounded. Commonwealth Government control of Euripides ended on 2 June 1917. However, she continued trooping, and her seventh voyage left Sydney on 31 October 1917. From February 1919 she repatriated troops to Australia. In her war service Euripides covered 208,307 nautical miles (385,785 km) and carried 38,349 troops.

By 1918 Euripides was equipped for wireless telegraphy, operated by the Marconi Company. Her call sign was MSE.

== Interbellum ==
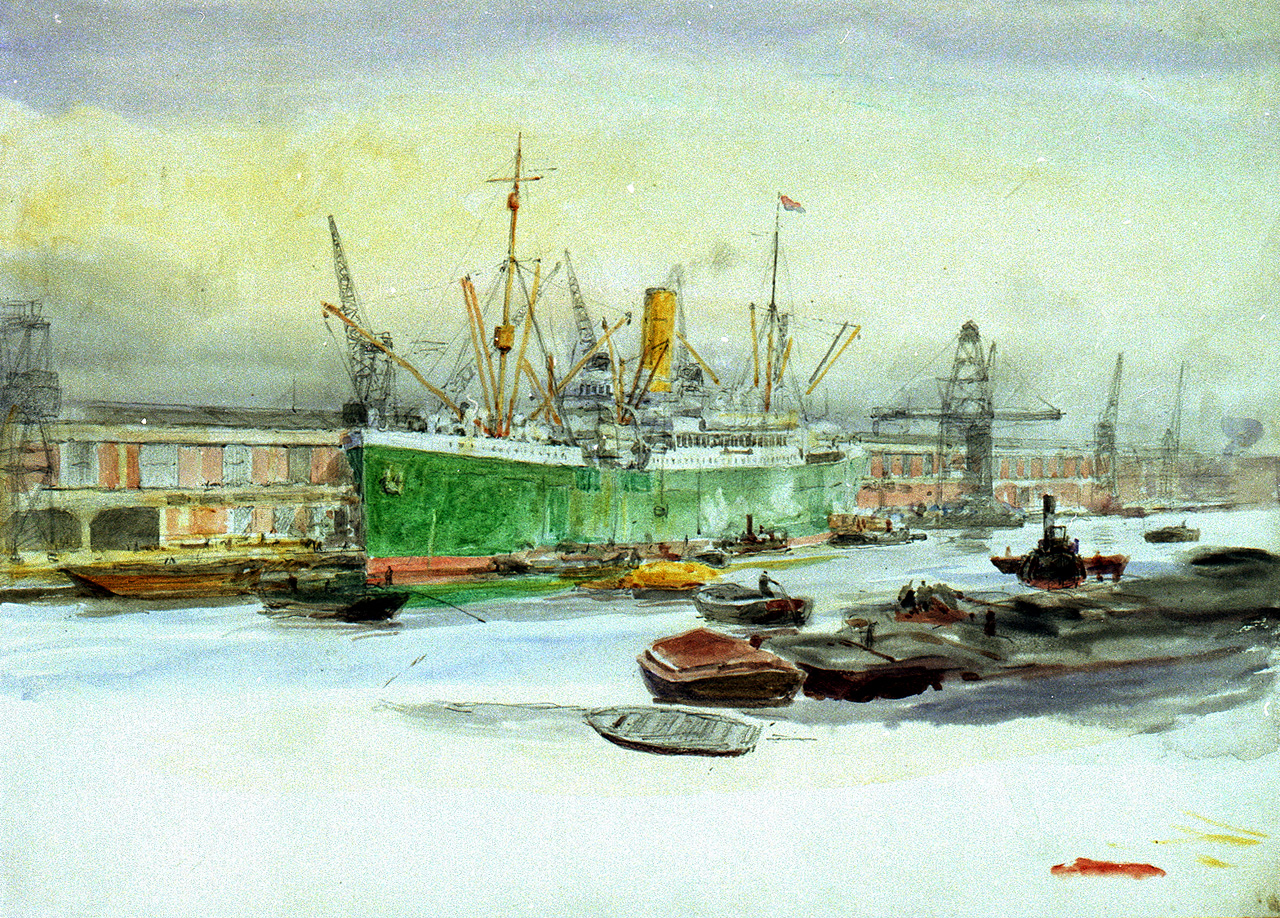
Euripides in London Docks, about 1920, by William Lionel Wyllie

After her troop service Euripides was overhauled at Belfast. In November 1920 she resumed Aberdeen Line's service between London and Australia. In 1922 the company took delivery of a pair of new 12,300 GRT liners, Sophocles and Diogenes. In March 1923 Euripides' route was changed to serve Southampton instead of London.

In 1927 Euripides was laid up for five months in the Firth of Clyde. She then went into a service between Liverpool and Australia run jointly by Aberdeen Line and Blue Funnel Line. In 1929 her management was transferred to White Star Line, but George Thompson & Co Ltd (Aberdeen Line) remained her owner.

By 1930 Euripides was equipped with wireless direction finding apparatus and her call sign had been changed to GMLP.

On 20 July 1931 the Royal Mail Case opened at the Old Bailey, which led to the collapse of White Star Line's parent company. In July 1932 ownership of Euripides passed to Shaw, Savill & Albion.

Hawthorn, Leslie at Hebburn, County Durham refitted the ship for her new owner. Her first class cabins were enlarged and modernised to form 200 "cabin class" berths. A gymnasium and swimming pool were added. Her third class accommodation was converted into additional cargo space, which increased her total refrigerated cargo capacity to 442,680 cubic feet (12,535 m^{3}). The refit increased her tonnages to 15,128 GRT and 9,461 NRT. Hawthorn, Leslie converted her from coal to oil burning.

Shaw, Savill and Albion renamed the ship Akaroa and transferred her to its service between Southampton and New Zealand via Curaçao and the Panama Canal. The company offered 100-day holidays from Britain to New Zealand for an all-inclusive fare of £112. It included a month in New Zealand in which Akaroa called at Auckland, Wellington, Lyttelton and Port Chalmers, and shore excursions arranged with the aid of the NZ Department of Tourism. She began her first voyage on the route on 28 February 1933.

By 1934 she was equipped with an echo sounding device and by 1936 she had a gyrocompass.

== Second World War ==
On 1 September 1939, the day the Second World War began, Akaroa left Southampton for New Zealand as normal. She reached Auckland on 8 October, where her passengers presented her Master, William Horation Hartman, with a silver salver in commemoration of "a notable and perilous voyage". On her return voyage after calling at Curaçao on 30 November she diverted to join Convoy HXF 12 from Halifax, Nova Scotia for her eastbound crossing of the Atlantic. On 27 December she docked in London instead of Southampton.

Throughout the war Akaroa continued to trade between Britain and New Zealand. Parts of her route were diverted for convoy protection, but for much of the time she sailed unescorted. In the course of the war she used different UK ports including Avonmouth, Belfast Lough, Cardiff, Falmouth, the Firth of Clyde, Liverpool, Milford Haven, Newport and Swansea.

Nine of her eastbound transatlantic crossings were with HX convoys. Five of her westbound crossings started with ON convoys, three started with OS convoys, and in 1944 she made one westbound Atlantic crossing to New York City with a UC convoy. In Convoy HX 206 in September 1942 Akaroa carried 300 passengers eastbound across the North Atlantic, despite having berths for only 200.

After the USA entered the war in December 1941, various convoys were introduced along the East Coast of the United States and across the Caribbean Sea. Akaroa sailed in some of these convoys, which involved diversions via Guantánamo Bay, New York or Key West.

During the war Akaroa served other ports of call as required. She called at Bermuda six times, including four visits in 1941. She visited Trinidad three times, Kingston, Jamaica twice, and in June 1945 she visited Saint Helena.

On one westbound voyage from Liverpool in November and December 1940 she went to Sydney and Melbourne instead of New Zealand, and called at Auckland and Wellington only on her return voyage in January 1941. On another westbound voyage in 1944 she called at Wellington on 27–28 September, continued to Sydney and Brisbane in October and then on her return voyage in November sailed straight from Sydney to Panama.

On 28 February 1943 Akaroa left New York with Convoy HX 228. On 10–11 March a wolf pack of nine U-boats attacked HX 228, sinking four merchant ships and the destroyer HMS Harvester. Akaroa and other survivors of HX 228 were ordered back to Halifax.

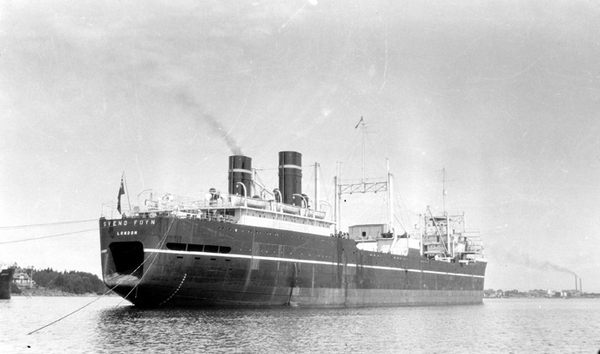
The whaling factory ship Svend Foyn, sunk by an iceberg on Convoy HX 229A

From Halifax, ships that had survived HX 228 joined Convoy HX 229A, which had left New York on 9 March. HX 229A ran into sea ice which damaged two merchant ships and sank the 14,795 GRT whaling factory ship Svend Foyn. Akaroa reached Liverpool with HX229A on 26 March.

In May 1943 Captain Hartman was made an OBE.

Later in 1943 Akaroa voyaged from Britain to Argentina, Uruguay and back. She left Liverpool on 17 September with Convoy OS 55, which took her as far as Freetown in Sierra Leone. She crossed the South Atlantic unescorted, spent 11 days in Buenos Aires, called at Montevideo on 3–5 November and returned unescorted to Freetown. There she joined Convoy SL 141, with which she reached Avonmouth on 15 December.

In 1945 Akaroa made one voyage to Australia, New Zealand and back via South Africa. She left Liverpool on 11 February with Convoy OS 110KM, called at Cape Town and Sydney, reached Auckland on 2 April and then called at Wellington and Lyttelton. She began her return voyage from Wellington on 5 May, called at Melbourne and Cape Town, and on 13 June 1945 called at Saint Helena.

== Post-war years ==
In the second half of 1945 Akaroa was overhauled and refitted on the River Tyne and returned to service between Britain and New Zealand. More of its cabins were made single-berth, more were given en suite bathrooms, and its total number of berths was slightly reduced to 190. Its tonnage was slightly increased again, to 15,320 GRT.

Akaroa started its final voyage from Britain to New Zealand on 2 January 1954. it was sold for scrap for £130,000 and on 12 May it arrived at Antwerp to be scrapped by Jos. de Smedt & Co.

== Bibliography ==
- Dowling, R (1909) [1903]. All About Ships & Shipping (2nd ed.). London: Alexander Moring Ltd.
- Dunn, Laurence (1964). Famous Liners of the Past Belfast Built. London: Adlard Coles. pp. 20–21.
- Harnack, Edwin P (1930) [1903]. All About Ships & Shipping (3rd ed.). London: Faber and Faber.
- Harnack, Edwin P (1949) [1903]. All About Ships & Shipping (8th ed.). London: Faber and Faber.
- Haws, Duncan (1989). Aberdeen & Commonwealth Lines. Merchant Fleets. Vol. 17. Hereford: TCL Publications. ISBN 978-0946378142.
- The Marconi Press Agency Ltd (1918). The Year Book of Wireless Telegraphy and Telephony. London: The Wireless Press, Ltd.
- Talbot-Booth, EC (1936). Ships and the Sea (Third ed.). London: Sampson Low, Marston & Co Ltd.
- Wilson, RM (1956). The Big Ships. London: Cassell & Co.
