= SS Themistocles =

SS Themistocles may refer to:

- SS Themistocles (1907)
- SS Themistocles (1911)
