= Greek ship Themistoklis =

At least four ships of the Hellenic Navy have borne the name Themistoklis (Greek: Θεμιστοκλής), sometimes rendered as Themistocles, after the ancient Athenian statesman:

- Greek destroyer Themistoklis (L51) a Hunt-class destroyer launched in 1942 as HMS Bramham and transferred to Greece and renamed in 1943. She was returned to the Royal Navy in 1959 and scrapped in 1960.
- Greek destroyer Themistoklis (D210) a Gearing-class destroyer launched in 1944 as USS Frank Knox she was transferred to Greece in 1971 and renamed. She was sunk as a target in 2001.
- Greek destroyer Themistoklis (D221) a Charles F. Adams-class destroyer launched in 1961 as USS Berkeley she was transferred to Greece in 1992 and renamed. She was scrapped in 2004.
- Greek frigate Themistoklis (F-465) an Elli-class frigate launched in 1979 as HNLMS Philips van Almonde she was transferred to Greece in 2002 and renamed.

== See also ==
At least two civilian ships called Themistocles:

- SS Themistocles (1907), a ship launched as Moraitis in 1907 and renamed Themistocles in 1908
- SS Themistocles (1911), a ship launched in 1910 and completed in 1911.
