= SS Pericles =

Steamship shipwrecked off Cape Leeuwin, Western Australia

Coordinates: 34°25′20″S 115°08′14″E

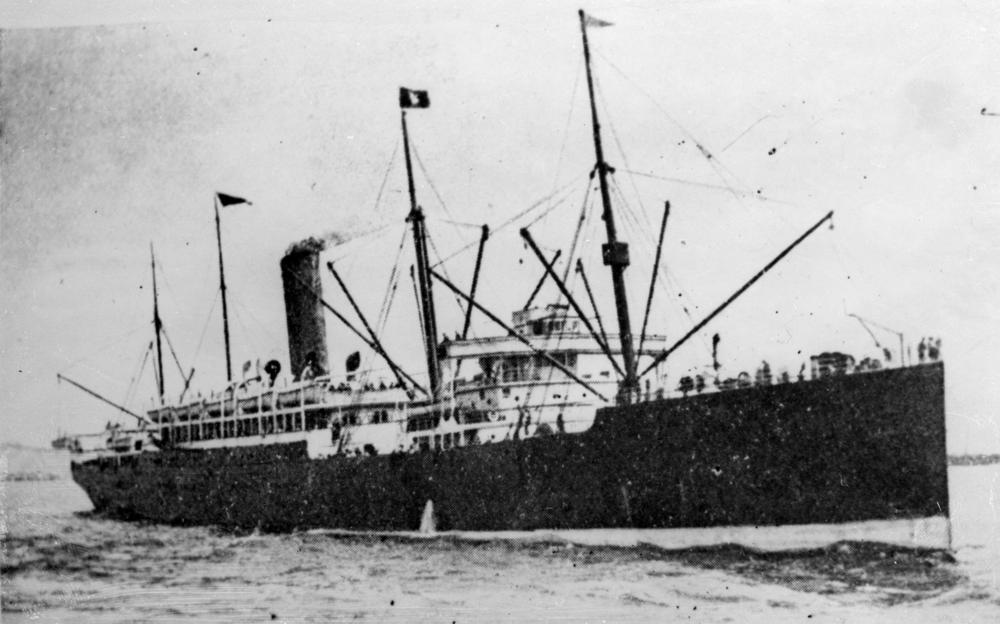
- Pericles

History

United Kingdom
- Name: Pericles
- Namesake: Pericles
- Owner: George Thompson & Co Ltd
- Operator: Aberdeen Line
- Port of registry: Aberdeen
- Route: London – Cape Town – Brisbane
- Builder: Harland & Wolff, Belfast
- Cost: £240,000
- Yard number: 392
- Launched: 21 December 1907
- Completed: 4 June 1908
- Maiden voyage: 8 July 1908
- Identification: UK official number 127153; code letters HMQP
- Fate: Struck a rock and sank, 1910

General characteristics
- Type: Ocean liner
- Tonnage: 10,925 GRT; 7,045 NRT; 11,200 DWT
- Length: 500.6 ft (152.6 m)
- Beam: 62.3 ft (19.0 m)
- Draught: 28.0 ft (8.53 m) forward; 27.0 ft (8.23 m) aft
- Depth: 39.4 ft (12.0 m)
- Decks: 2
- Installed power: 1,075 NHP
- Propulsion: 2 × quadruple-expansion engines; 2 × screws
- Speed: 15 knots (28 km/h)
- Capacity: 100 saloon class; 250 third class
- Crew: 163
- Sensors & processing systems: submarine signalling
- Notes: sister ships: Themistocles, Demosthenes

SS Pericles was a UK steam ocean liner and refrigerated cargo ship. She was launched in 1907 in Ireland for the Aberdeen Line service between Great Britain and Australia via South Africa. When new, she was the largest ship on the route.

Pericles was wrecked in 1910 off the coast of Western Australia, but without loss of life. Federal Australian law now protects her wreck off Cape Leeuwin for its historic significance.

== Name ==
In the 19th century Aberdeen Line named some of its sailing ships after classical Greek people and events. In the 20th century the company re-used some of these names on steamships.

Pericles was a statesman, orator and general in Classical Athens in the fifth century BC. Aberdeen Line's previous Pericles was a three-masted iron-hulled sailing ship launched in 1877 in Aberdeen and sold to Norwegian owners in 1904.

== Building ==
Harland & Wolff built Pericles on slipway number four of its North Yard in Belfast, launching her on 21 December 1907 and completing her on 4 June 1908.

Pericles was 500.6 ft (152.6 m) long, her beam was 62.3 ft (19.0 m) and her depth 39.4 ft (12.0 m). She had a double bottom for the full length of her hull and eight watertight compartments to help keep her afloat in case her hull was breached. Her hull had bilge keels to improve stability.

Pericles had berths for 100 saloon class passengers spread over four decks, and 250 third class passengers. Her holds were refrigerated and had a total of six hatches. Her tonnages were 10,925 GRT, 7,045 NRT and 11,200 DWT. On entering service she was the largest liner on the route between Britain and Australia.

Pericles had twin screws driven by quadruple-expansion steam engines whose combined power output was rated at 1,075 NHP. Her navigational aids included submarine signalling apparatus.

Pericles was the first ship Harland and Wolff built for Aberdeen Line. She cost £240,000. Harland and Wolff later built her two sister ships: Themistocles launched in 1910 and Demosthenes launched in 1911.

Pericles was registered at Aberdeen. Her UK official number was 127153 and her code letters were HMQP.

== Service ==
Aberdeen Line ran scheduled services between London and Australia via Cape Town. On 8 July 1908 Pericles left London in her maiden voyage. On 24 August she reached Sydney, where The Sydney Morning Herald greeted the "new mammoth Aberdeen liner" as "a magnificent liner" and "a floating palace".

Pericles was the largest ship in the Aberdeen Line fleet. Her Master was Alexander Simpson, who was the Commodore of the Aberdeen Line fleet and had 46 years' experience at sea.

== Loss and rescue ==
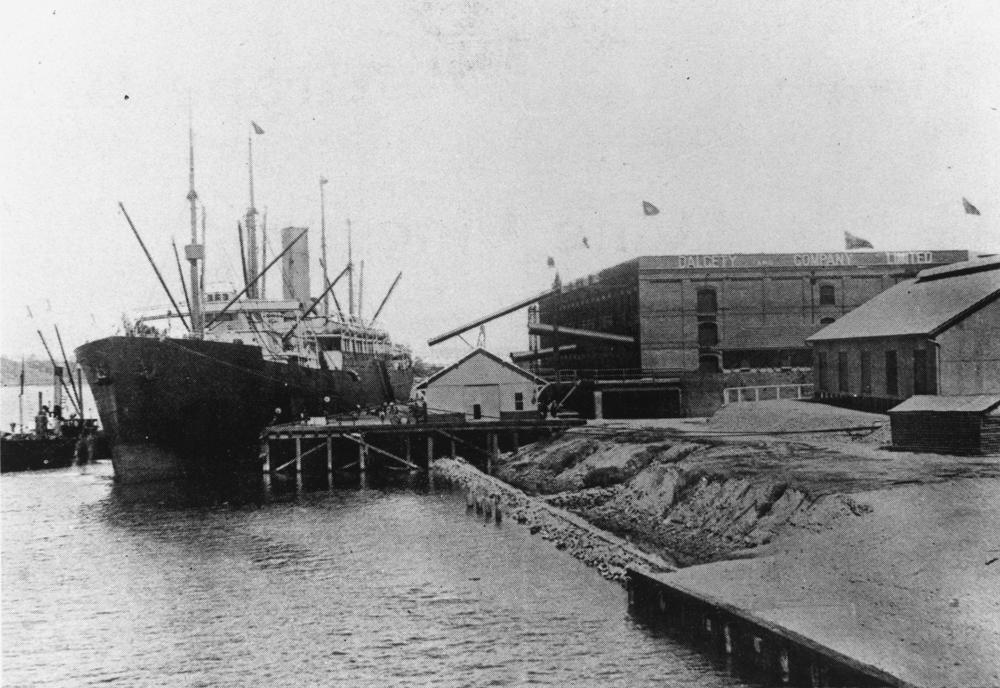
Pericles at the Dalgety & Company wharf, New Farm, Brisbane

Pericles' final voyage began from Brisbane in Queensland in 1910. She called at Sydney, Hobart and Melbourne and was due to call at Fremantle. She was heavily laden with a cargo that included 32,000 boxes of butter, 35,000 frozen carcasses of mutton, 6,000 bales of wool, several thousand cases of apples, 600 tons of lead ingots, 25 tons of tallow and a quantity of coconut oil. The lead was on its way to England in 1910 because it contained gold, platinum and silver, and at the time Australia lacked the means to separate the precious and base metals. Pericles and her cargo were insured for a total of £750,000.

Miners in the Newcastle, New South Wales area had been on strike, which had caused a coal shortage in Australia. Coal had been imported from the US, India and Natal, and the strike had ended by 14 March, but the shortage was expected to continue for some weeks. When Pericles called at Melbourne she was delayed there for three days until she could bunker. She then left for Fremantle on 24 March.

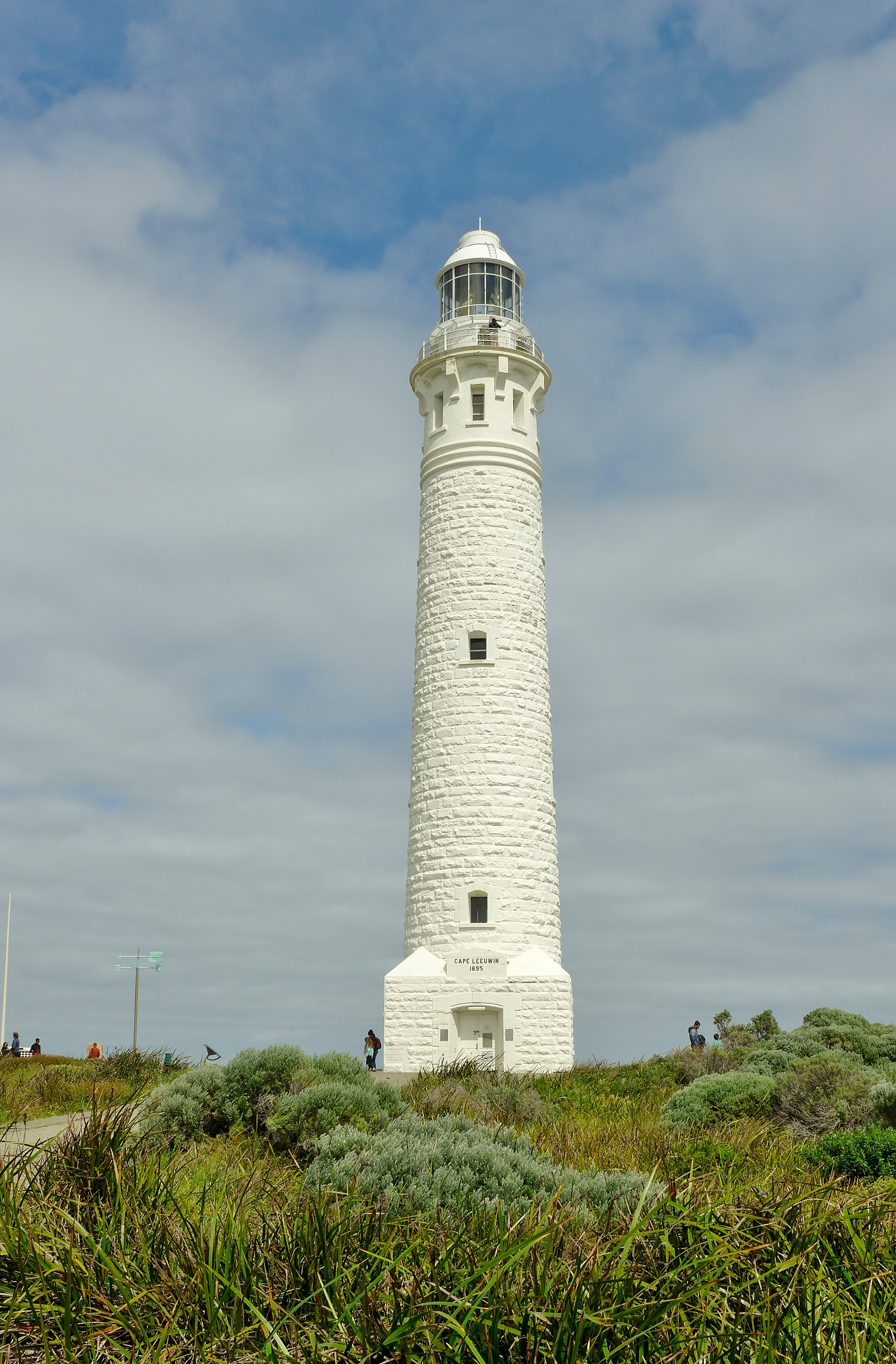
Cape Leeuwin Lighthouse, whose crew guided survivors safely ashore

At 1532 hrs on 31 March Pericles was off the coast of Western Australia, steaming at 14 knots (26 km/h) in good visibility, when she struck an uncharted rock off St Alouarn Island, 3 1/2 nautical miles (6.5 km) southeast of Cape Leeuwin, the most south-westerly point on the Australian mainland. She passed over the rock but the forward plates of her hull were damaged. Within three minutes there was 16.4 ft (5 m) of water in her forward hold. Her Chief Engineer, WL Robertson, and his crew worked waist deep in water to shore up her bulkheads and keep her pumps running.

The cargo ship Strathfillan was within sight, steaming south. Pericles blew her whistle, flew a distress message with her signal flags and turned broadside to Strathfillan to attract her attention, but Strathfillan continued south.

Captain Simpson gave the order to abandon ship. Within 25 minutes Pericles' crew had launched all 14 lifeboats, carrying all passengers and all of the crew. The only fatality was the one-eyed ship's cat, Nelson, who drowned. The crew of Cape Leeuwin Lighthouse lit fires ashore to guide the boats to safe landfall in Sarge Bay.

The last boat, carrying Captain Simpson, stood close to Pericles while she remained afloat. The ship drifted southeast for a short while, down by her head, then listed to starboard and sank bow-first. The last boat made land at 1900 hrs, after nightfall.

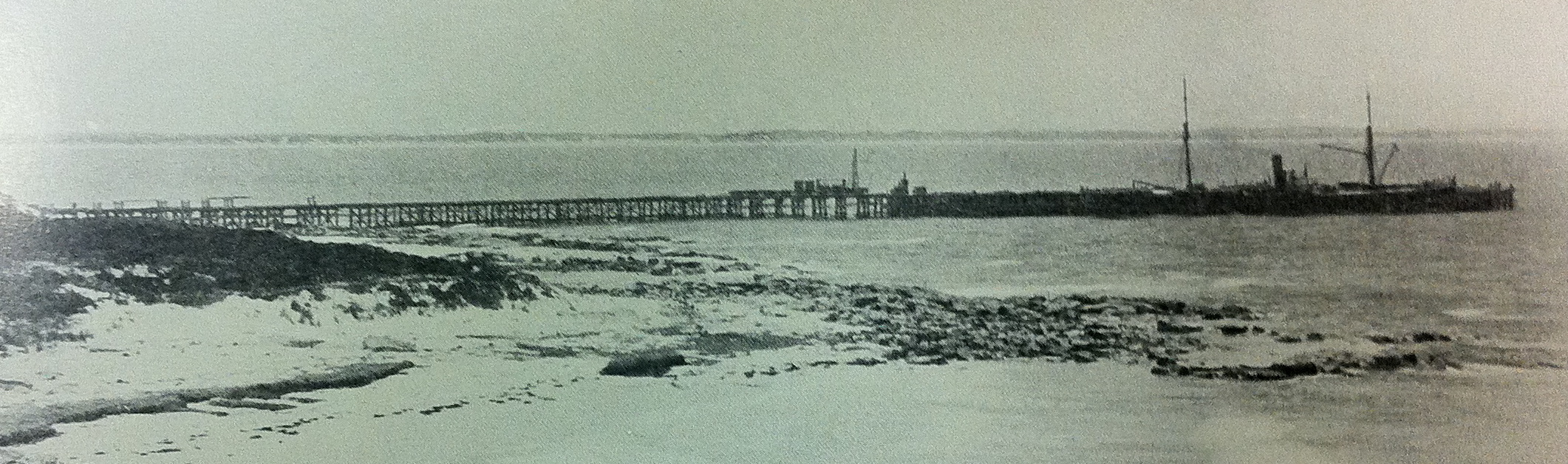
Flinders Bay Jetty, where Monaro embarked survivors

The next day the steamship Monaro embarked most of the passengers from Flinders Bay Jetty and took them to Fremantle. About 30 passengers chose instead to travel 200 miles (320 km) overland from Cape Leeuwin to Fremantle. Monaro was a smaller ship with limited accommodation, so her officers gave up their quarters to Pericles' female survivors.

The Royal Humane Society of Australasia gave awards to the three keepers of the Cape Leeuwin Lighthouse for their effort rescuing Pericles' passengers and crew. A local clergyman was given a gold watch and his daughter was given a gold brooch for their care for the survivors.

== Inquiry ==
The Fremantle Harbour Master, Captain Irvine, held a preliminary inquiry on 5 April 1910. He recommended to the Colonial Secretary of Western Australia that a full Court of Marine Inquiry be held. This opened on 7 April at Fremantle Court House.

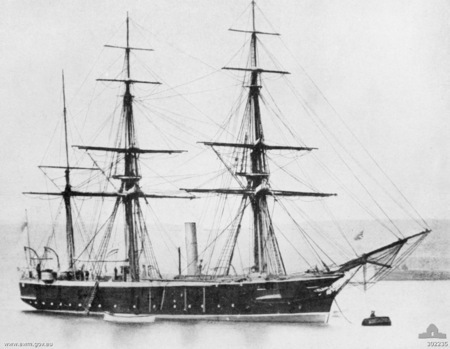
The sloop HMS Penguin, which surveyed the sea around Cape Leeuwin for an Admiralty chart in 1900

The sloop HMS Penguin had surveyed the sea around Cape Leeuwin for an Admiralty chart in 1900. The court heard that Penguin had taken soundings at 1 nautical mile (1.9 km) intervals, and had missed the pinnacle that Pericles had struck.

The court was therefore adjourned while a government steamship, a different Penguin, searched the area to find both the rock and the wreck. Penguin sounded the area by lead and line. She reported that Pericles lay two miles and seven chains off Leeuwin Lighthouse, in 16 fathoms (29 m) of water, and with the tops of her spars and derricks only 3 fathoms (5.5 m) below the surface.

On 14 April the court found that Captain Simpson and his officers had exercised proper care and vigilance in planning Pericles' course, navigating her and determining her position. The rock that Pericles struck was uncharted and therefore Simpson and his officers were not to blame.

The court also found that both the wreck and the rock were hazards to navigation. Therefore, on 22 April 1910 Captain Irvine posted a notice to mariners in the Government Gazette of Western Australia warning of the wreck at in the position that Penguin reported, and of the rock somewhere in the vicinity in about 24 feet (7.3 m) of water.

Attempts to find the rock were unsuccessful. On 4 May 1910 Penguin was sent back to look for it. In mid-May it was reported that one of Pericles' masts or derricks was now 6 feet (2 m) above water, and a few days later it had risen to 3 feet (1 m). It was surmised that the wreck, which had sunk with a starboard list, had partly righted herself.

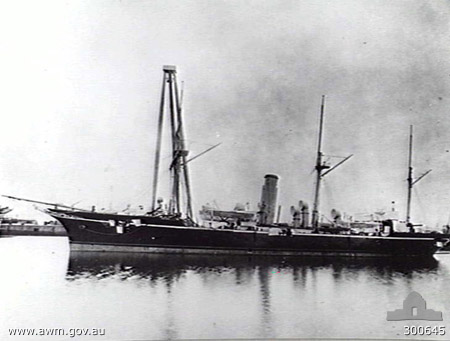
The sloop HMS Fantome, which tried to find the rock Pericles had struck

In December 1910 the sloop HMS Fantome was sent find the rock. She too was unsuccessful. It was surmised that when Pericles hit the rock, she may have knocked the pinnacle off it.

== Initial salvage ==
Some of Pericles' cargo was salvaged as flotsam in the weeks after she sank. Local residents recovered boxes of butter and apples, barrels of coconut oil, empty barrels, doors and other timber that had broken loose from the ship. Local men formed three syndicates with bullock teams to gather flotsam from the shore, and it was reported that each syndicate made £1,000. A steamship called Una salvaged 1,800 boxes of butter and some tallow.

A fisherman from nearby Busselton acquired one of Pericles' lifeboats, rigged her as a cutter, named her Rose and used her for fishing. Two other lifeboats from Pericles were bought and rigged as fishing boats, one by a man from nearby Bunbury.

In 1919 a company called Ball and Sons reportedly searched for the wreck but did not find it. However, on 12 January 1969 The Sunday Times published an article claiming that Ball and Sons did find the wreck, dived on it from a steamboat called Florrie, and recovered fittings from the wreck.

== Replacement ship ==
Less than 10 days after Pericles sank, it was reported that Aberdeen Line had ordered "a duplicate steamer" to replace her, which would be ready for her maiden voyage to Australia in March or April 1911. It is not clear whether this refers to Themistocles, which was launched in September 1910 and made her maiden voyage in February 1911, or Demosthenes, which was launched in February 1911 and made her maiden voyage that August.

== Later salvage ==
In 1957 a US submariner called Tom Snider found the wreck and formed a company to recover items from her. By 1961 his Universal Salvage Company had raised 400 to 500 tons of lead ingots, which he exported from Bunbury to London for the precious metals to be separated from the base metal.

In 1961 Snider was killed in an air crash. Salvage work continued, and at least three blades of Pericles' propellers were recovered for scrap. Pericles had two propellers in use, and a third chained to her deck as a spare.

The salvage rights and ownership of the wreck passed through various hands, until some time after 1989 the wreck was given to the Western Australian Museum in Perth.

== Preserved artefacts ==
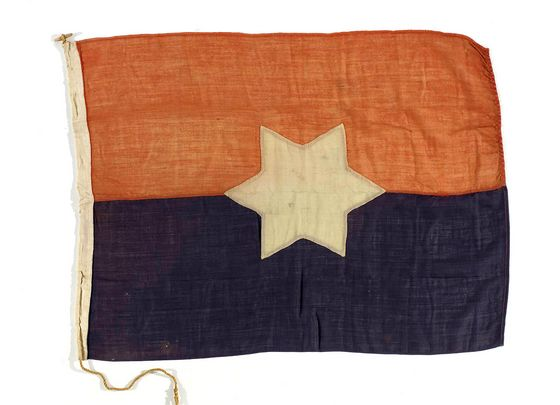
An Aberdeen Line house flag in the UK National Maritime Museum, similar to that from Pericles in the Western Australian Museum

The Western Australian Museum has an Aberdeen Line house flag that one of Pericles' engineers saved from the ship before she sank. Augusta Historical Museum has a bell that was recovered from the wreck. Snider gave two bronze valves from the ship to the then Harbour Master of Fremantle, Captain FHB Humble.

== Wreck ==
The Australian Underwater Cultural Heritage Act 2018 protects Pericles' wreck for several reasons. She is the largest historic wreck of her era in the area, the only wreck in Western Australian waters that has quadruple expansion engines, and she is of social significance.

The wreck is about 590 ft (180 m) long and 230 ft (70 m) wide and lies at a depth of about 115 ft (35 m). Her twin engines, twin propeller shafts and three of her boilers are visible, along with her anchors, the unsalvaged parts of her propellers, and part of her frame. Some lead ingots still remain in and around the stern of the wreck.

== Bibliography ==
- Dowling, R (1909) [1903]. All About Ships & Shipping (2nd ed.). London: Alexander Moring Ltd.
- Dunn, Laurence (1964). Famous Liners of the Past Belfast Built. London: Adlard Coles. pp. 20–21.
