= RMS Mataroa =

20th century ocean liner

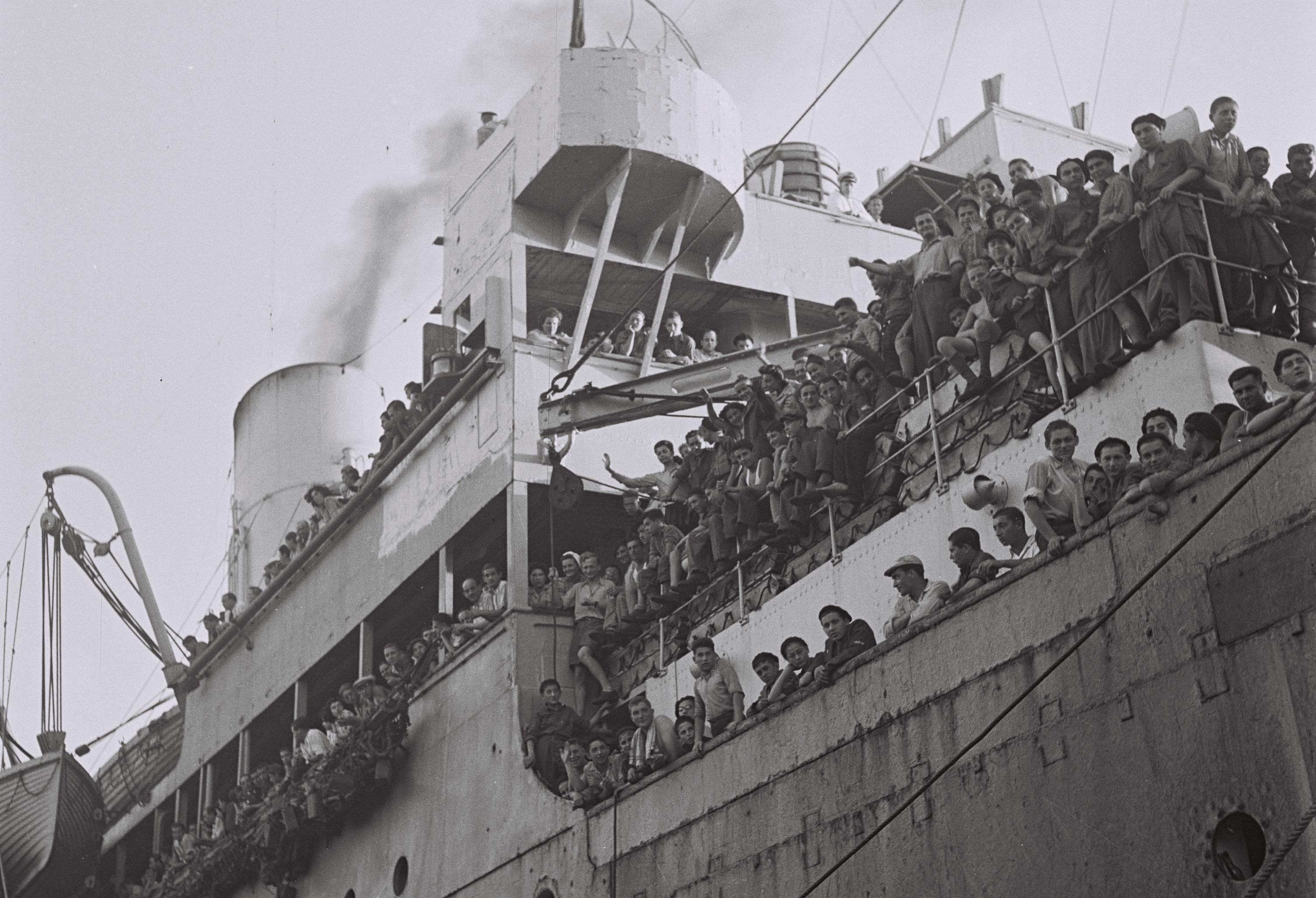
- RMS Mataroa in Haifa port

History
- Name: SS Mataroa
- Operator: Aberdeen Line (1921-1932)
- Route: UK to New Zealand
- Builder: Harland & Wolff, Belfast
- Yard number: 575
- Launched: 2 March 1922
- Fate: Scrapped 29 March 1957

General characteristics
- Type: Passenger ship
- Tonnage: 12,375 GRT
- Length: 500 ft 4 in (152.50 m)
- Beam: 63 ft 2 in (19.25 m)
- Draught: 24 ft 2 in (7.37 m)
- Depth of hold: 39 ft 6 in (12.04 m)
- Installed power: 5,200 s.h.p.
- Propulsion: win screw, initially coal fired turbines, changed to oil fired in 1926
- Speed: 13.5 knots (25.0 km/h; 15.5 mph)

RMS Mataroa (formerly named the Diogenes) was a 12,341-ton ocean liner built by Harland & Wolff in 1922. She was chartered to the Shaw, Savill & Albion Line with her sister ship SS Sophocles in 1926 and renamed Mataroa. She was scrapped in 1957.

In 1945, Mataroa made two famous journeys:

- In August 1945, the Mataroa was chartered to transport from Marseille to Haifa 173 Jewish children of the Œuvre de secours aux enfants (OSE), survivors of the Buchenwald concentration camp, who had family in Palestine. She later transported 1,200 survivors of Bergen-Belsen.
- In late December 1945, the Mataroa brought from Greece to Taranto in southern Italy a number of Greek artists and intellectuals aiming to reach Paris in order to escape the White Terror. The vast majority were scholars of France. This trip was organized by the then Director of the French Institute of Athens, philhellene Octave Merlier, and his deputy Roger Milliex, husband of Tatiana Gritsi-Milliex. Some of the passengers became internationally recognised artists, scientists or intellectuals, including: architect Georges Candilis, artists Constantine Andreou and Costa Coulentianos, philosophers Kostas Axelos, Cornelius Castoriadis and Kostas Papaïoannou, linguist Emmanuel Kriaras, filmmaker Ado Kyrou, and physician Miltiadès Papamiltiadès.

== See also ==
- Mataroa

== Sources ==
- Bordes, François (2011). "Exil et création. Des penseurs grecs dans la vie intellectuelle française" [Exile and creation: Greek thinkers in French intellectual life]. In S. Jollivet; C. Prémat; M. Rosengren (eds.). Destins d’exilés : trois philosophes grecs à Paris : Kostas Axelos, Cornelius Castoriadis, Kostas Papaïoannou (in French). Paris: Le manuscrit. pp. 63–73.
- Koutouzis, Michel (1 June 2010). "Les voyages du Mataroa". Agoravox (in French).
