= Athinai =

Athinai can refer to:

- The English transliteration of Αθήναι [aˈθine], a form of the Greek name for the city of Athens.
- SS Athinai (1908), a ship of Greek registry that burned and sank in the Atlantic on 20 September 1915.
- SS Athinai (1932), a ship of Greek registry acquired from the Grace Line in 1961 and scrapped in 1989.
