= SS Athinai =

Greek passenger steamship, 1908–1915

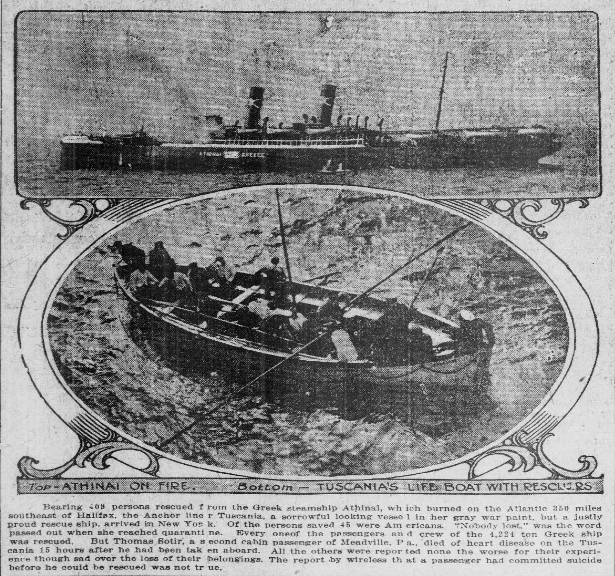
- Above: Athinai on fire. Below: one of Tuscania′s lifeboats with rescuers.

History

Greece
- Name: Athinai
- Namesake: Athens
- Owner: 1908: Hellenic Transatlantic SN Co; 1914: National SN Co of Greece
- Operator: 1914: Embiricos Bros
- Port of registry: Piraeus
- Builder: Sir Raylton Dixon & Co Ltd, Middlesbrough
- Yard number: 537
- Launched: 19 June 1908
- Completed: October 1908
- Commissioned: as troop ship, November 1912
- Decommissioned: as troop ship, 23 June 1913
- Maiden voyage: 13 May 1909
- Identification: wireless call sign SVA
- Fate: burned & sank, 1915

General characteristics
- Type: Ocean liner
- Tonnage: 6,742 GRT, 4,405 NRT
- Length: 420.0 ft (128.0 m)
- Beam: 52.0 ft (15.8 m)
- Depth: 27.5 ft (8.4 m)
- Decks: 2
- Installed power: 598 NHP
- Propulsion: 2 × triple expansion engines; 2 × screws
- Speed: 14 knots (26 km/h)

SS Athinai was a Greek passenger steamship that was built in England in 1908 and sank in the North Atlantic in 1915. She was built to be a transatlantic ocean liner, but she served also as a troop ship.

Athinai sank as the result of a fire in one of her cargo holds, which seemed to have been caused deliberately. In 1916 a US court convicted three German citizens of causing the fire.

== Hellenic Transatlantic Steam Navigation Company ==
In 1907 DG Moraitis founded the Hellenic Transatlantic Line. It operated a new liner, Moraitis, that John Priestman and Company had built in Sunderland, England.

Hellenic Transatlantic Line went bankrupt in 1908. The Hellenic Transatlantic Steam Navigation Company was founded to take over its ships and services. The new company renamed Moraitis as Themistocles, and took delivery of the slightly larger Athinai after she was completed in October 1908.

== Building ==
Sir Raylton Dixon and Company Ltd built Athinai at Middlesbrough, Yorkshire, launching her on 19 June 1908 and completing her that October. Her registered length was 420 ft (130 m), her beam was 52 ft (16 m) and her depth was 27.5 ft (8.4 m). Her tonnages were 6,742 GRT and 4,405 NRT.

Athinai had twin screws. Each screw was driven by a three-cylinder triple expansion steam engine, built by the North East Marine Engineering Company of Newcastle upon Tyne. The combined power of her twin engines was rated at 598 NHP and gave her a speed of 14 knots (26 km/h).

== Entry to service ==
The Hellenic Transatlantic Steam Navigation Company registered Athinai in Piraeus. Her route was between Piraeus and New York via Kalamata and Patras in Greece, Palermo in Sicily, and São Miguel in the Azores. Although she was completed in October 1908, she did not start her maiden voyage from Piraeus until 13 May 1909.

== Immigration case ==
In 1910 the US Bureau of Immigration started investigating the Hellenic Transatlantic Company on suspicion of breaking the Immigration Act of 1907. The Bureau placed Athinai and other Greek ships under covert surveillance. It concluded that on each voyage to New York, each of it ships brought three or four dozen immigrants who avoided the immigration procedures on Ellis Island by either posing as members of the crew or being concealed aboard by members of the crew.

On 25 February 1911 the company's New York agent and his secretary were arrested, Athinai was raided, and 22 of her crew were arrested, including her Master, Captain Koulowas, all of her officers, and certain of her firemen and stewards. New York's Assistant District Attorney led the raid. He released one of her engineering officers after Koulowas pointed out that no-one was left to look after Athinai's engines.

The District Attorney sought $20,000 bail for Captain Koulowas and $10,000 for his Chief Engineer, Petros Kyrkinos. This was reduced to $10,000 and $4,000 respectively, in the latter case to let Kyrkinos to return to look after Athinai's engines.

In due course the other arrested officers and crew were released. They then jumped bail by sailing Athinai back to Greece.

On 17 April Athinai arrived back in New York, with a different Master, Captain Nomicos, and different officers. She called at Ellis Island, where the authorities found three cases of meningitis aboard. The District Attorney sought the extradition of Captain Koulowas and his officers, but their alleged offences were not ones for which they could be extradited under Greek law.

== Later service ==
On 8 October 1912 the First Balkan War began. The Greek government chartered Athinai, Themistocles, the National Steam Navigation Company liner Macedonia and another Greek ship to take to Greece 6,400 Greeks living in the USA who were either Hellenic Army reservists or volunteers. In November 1912 the Royal Hellenic Navy requisitioned Athinai as a troop ship. She was returned to her owners in June 1913.

By 1913 Athinai was equipped for wireless telegraphy, which the Marconi Company supplied and operated under contract. By 1914 her call sign was SVA. Her wireless set had a transmission range of 220 nautical miles (410 km).

In August 1914 the Hellenic Transatlantic company went bankrupt. The National Steamship Navigation Company Ltd of Greece bought Athinai, kept her on the same route, and appointed Embiricos Brothers to manage her.

== Loss ==
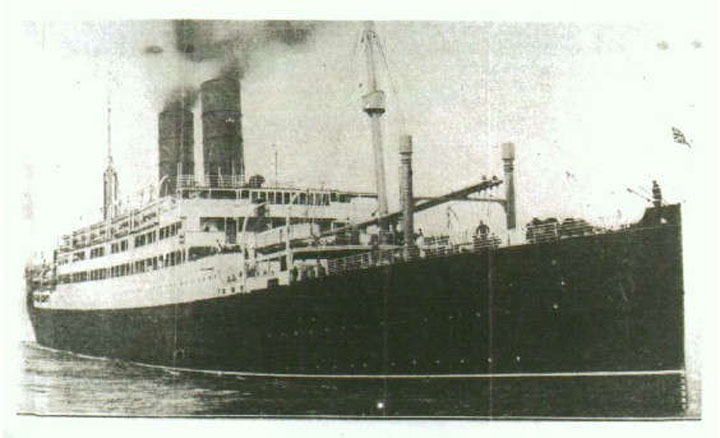
Tuscania, which rescued Athinai's passengers and crew

On 13 September 1915 Athinai left New York carrying 438 passengers, 70 crew, and a cargo of coffee, rice, cotton, cotton waste and rolls of paper for printing newspapers. On the morning of 18 September a fire started in her Number 2 hold. Her Master (Note: US news reporters seem to have struggled with the Captain's Greek surname, variously calling him Nicolas Bogiazides, Boziatzides or Boziatgiles. In some cases more than one spelling of his name is used in the same news report. Hence this article refers to him as simply the "Master" or "Captain".) ordered the hold vents closed, and pumped steam from the engine into the hold to try to put out the fire. As the fire continued, he ordered the hatches opened and the hold flooded. Then the crew started removing luggage and cargo from the hold to gain access to the fire. By 17:00 hrs on 18 September the fire seemed to be under control.

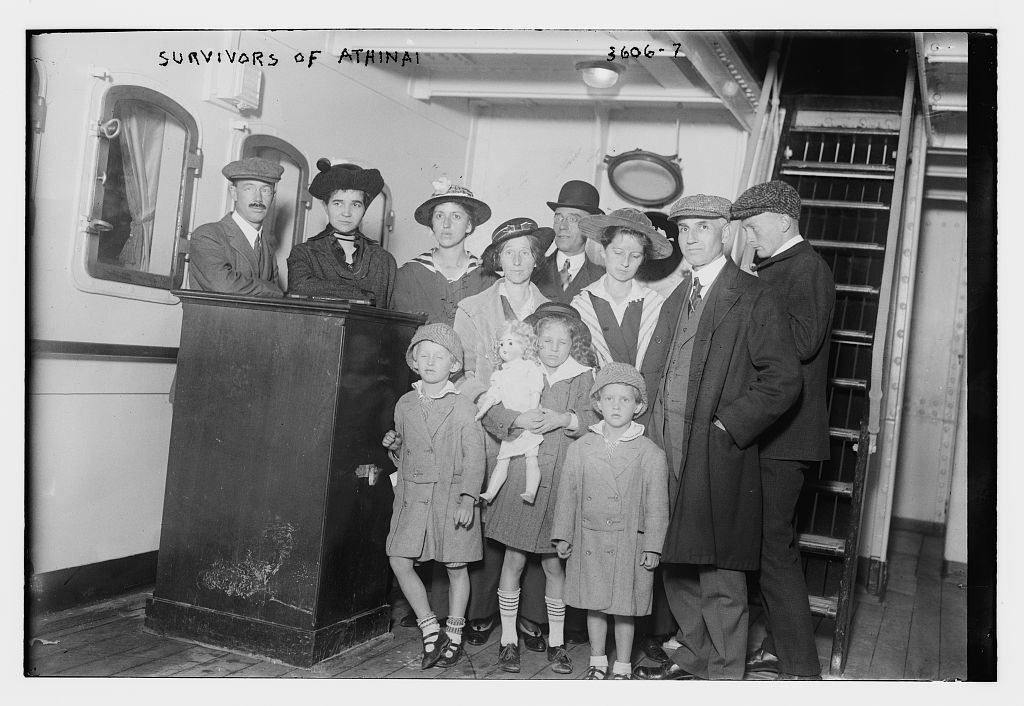
Athinai survivors, possibly aboard one of the ships that rescued them

By 08:00 hrs on 19 September the fire had restarted in Number 2 hold and spread to Number 1 hold. Athinai's wireless operator transmitted a general distress signal. This was received by the Anchor liner Tuscania, Prince Line cargo ship Roumanian Prince and CGT liner La Touraine. By the time Tuscania and Roumanian Prince arrived, the fire seemed uncontrollable.

Tuscania launched eight of her lifeboats to rescue Athinai's passengers and crew. Tuscania embarked 408 survivors and Prince took 61. Athinai was abandoned at 40°54′N 58°47′W All of Athinai's passengers and crew were rescued. One second class passenger, Tomaso Sotoniou of Meadville, Pennsylvania, died of heart disease 15 hours after boarding Tuscania, and was buried at sea.

Tuscania landed survivors at Brooklyn, where immigration officers detained 29 of them to be taken to Ellis Island and deported. However, as the crowd of 235 steerage passengers was being marshalled, 22 of the detainees escaped.

== Investigation ==
Athinai's Captain immediately asserted his belief that the fire was caused by incendiary bombs, noting that the fire started in a hold containing a relatively non-combustible cargo of rice and coffee and that the fire had seemed to reignite at several points in the hold on the morning of 19 September, after the fire seemed to have been damped by pressurized steam the previous day. Based on his testimony, the National Steamship Company hired a detective agency to investigate the workers involved in loading the hold. Marine Department officials noted that the fire broke out at about the same location as aboard Sant Anna, which had also caught fire on 19 September.

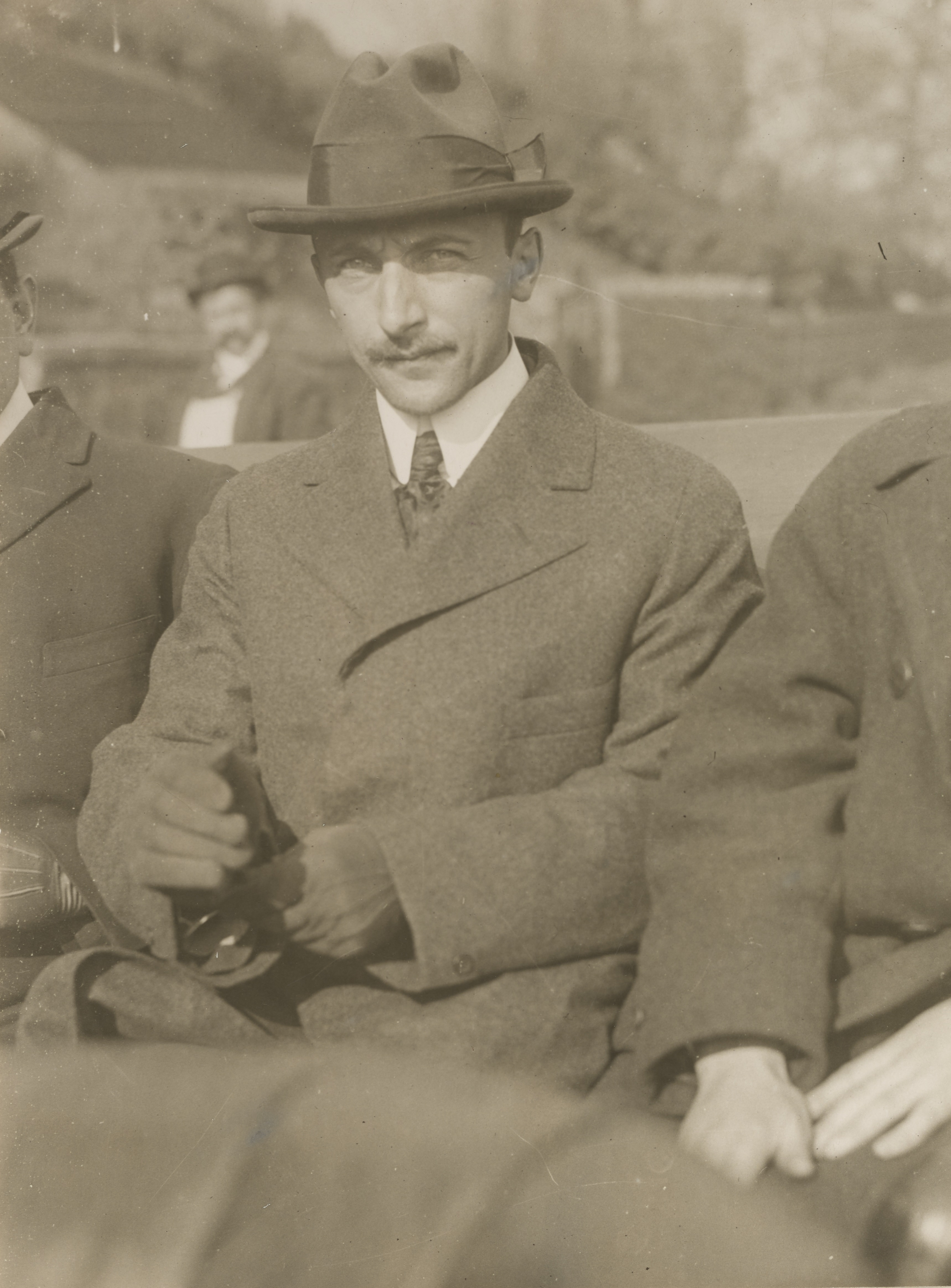
Robert Fay, leader of the plot to bomb ships sailing from New York

On 24 October two Germans were arrested in New Jersey. Robert Fay and Walter Scholz had attracted suspicion by trying to buy 10 pounds (4.5 kg) of picric acid, an ingredient in certain explosives. Investigators arrested the pair, and searched the men's rented apartment in Weehawken, and a storage unit that they rented in West Hoboken. The search found New York Harbor maps, high explosives and explosive mines modified to be attached to the sterns of ships. Fay and Scholz readily confessed that they were working for the German secret service and had tried to blow up ships. A third man, Paul Daeche, was arrested in Jersey City on 25 October. By November 1915 a total of six men were charged with trying to blow up ships.

On 3 November 1915 a federal grand jury took up the cases of Fay, Scholz and Germans suspected in other bomb plots. Daeche obtained a writ of habeas corpus against the charges brought against him, but a judge in New Jersey overturned it on 23 December.

== Trial ==
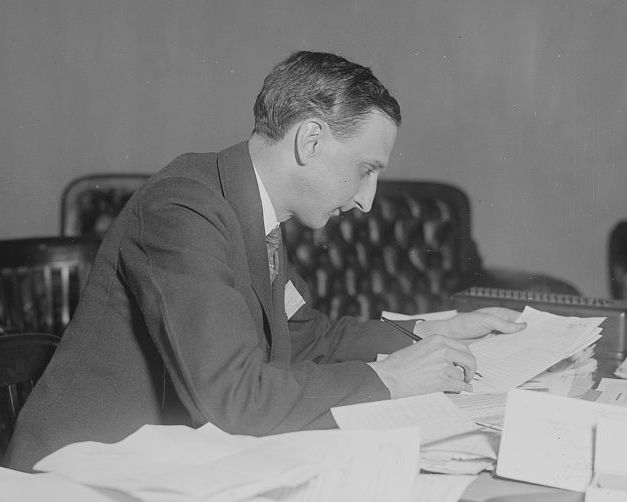
Assistant United States Attorney John C Knox in 1917, the year after he prosecuted Fay, Scholz and Daeche

In April 1916 Fay, Scholz and Daeche faced trial in a United States district court. Assistant United States Attorney John C Knox led the prosecution. Witnesses told the trial that Fay had bought the explosives trinitrotoluol and potassium chlorate. The trial was shown dynamite that Fay had obtained, and a mechanical timing and detonating device that he had designed and made with parts including shafts, gear wheels, plungers, springs, firing pins and gun cartridges.

The trial continued into May 1916. A model of the stern of a ship was shown to the court to show how Fay's device would be secured to the rudder post. The normal operation of the rudder would wind up the device's clockwork mechanism, and eventually detonate the TNT explosive charge. A United States Army Coast Artillery Corps lieutenant from Fort Wadsworth told the court that the device, if detonated, would blow the stern off a ship.

Fay denied the artillery lieutenant's assessment. Fay claimed that his purpose was "humanitarian", he designed his device to disable a ship without sinking it, he had no intention of attacking a ship himself, and instead he hoped to sell his invention to the US Government for $500,000.

Scholz implicated Fay as being the leader of the plot. Daeche denied knowing that Fay planned to bomb ships, and thought that Fay wanted to buy explosives legitimately on behalf of the German government.

On 8 May 1916 the district court convicted Fay, Scholz and Daeche on two charges of "conspiring to destroy vehicles with intent to cause loss", but the jury "asked a strong plea of clemency for Paul Daeche". He was released on $25,000 bail to await sentencing. Fay declared that he intended to appeal against his conviction. His defense counsel claimed that the TNT had been planted on Fay.

The court sentenced Fay to eight years' imprisonment, Scholz to four years and Daeche to two years. All three were to serve their sentences in the United States Penitentiary, Atlanta.

== Bibliography ==
- Bonsor, NRP (1979). North Atlantic Seaway. Vol. 3. Jersey: Brookside Publications. p. 1,386. ISBN 978-0905824024.
- Lloyd's Register of British and Foreign Shipping. Vol. I–Steamers. London: Lloyd's Register of Shipping. 1909. ATH–ATL – via Internet Archive.
- Lloyd's Register of British and Foreign Shipping. Vol. I–Steamers. London: Lloyd's Register of Shipping. 1913. ATH–ATL – via Internet Archive.
- "List of Vessels Fitted With Installation of Wireless Telegraphy". Lloyd's Register of Shipping. Vol. I–Steamers, Sailing Vessels, and Owners. London: Lloyd's Register of Shipping. 1914.
- Lloyd's Register of Shipping. Vol. I–Steamers. London: Lloyd's Register of Shipping. 1915. ATH – via Internet Archive.
- The Marconi Press Agency Ltd (1914). The Year Book of Wireless Telegraphy and Telephony. London: The Marconi Press Agency Ltd.
