= SS Macedonia (1911) =

History
- Name: 1911: Macedonia; 1922: Pincio
- Namesake: 1911: Macedonia; 1922: Pincio in Rome
- Owner: 1911: National SN Co of Greece; 1917: Hollandsche Algemeene Atlantische SM; 1922: Lloyd Latino
- Operator: 1911: Embiricos Bros; 1912: Royal Hellenic Navy
- Port of registry: 1912: (Greece) Andros; 1917: (Netherlands) Amsterdam; 1922: (Kingdom of Italy) Genoa
- Route: 1912: Piraeus – Jersey City; 1928: Genoa – Marseille – Rio de Janeiro – Santos – Montevideo – Buenos Aires
- Builder: Sir James Laing & Sons, Sunderland
- Yard number: 631
- Launched: 11 September 1911
- Completed: 22 February 1912
- Refit: 1916, 1922
- Identification: 1912: code letters HSWN; 1918: code letters PJTN; 1928: code letters PCUI
- Fate: Scrapped 1932

General characteristics
- Type: Ocean liner
- Tonnage: 1912: 6,333 GRT, 3,540 NRT; 1923: 6,075 GRT, 3,239 NRT
- Length: 422.0 ft (128.6 m)
- Beam: 51.0 ft (15.5 m)
- Depth: 23.4 ft (7.1 m)
- Decks: 1912: 2; 1920: 1; 1922: 2
- Installed power: 1912: 1,108 NHP; 1916: 500 NHP; 1922: 913 NHP
- Propulsion: 2 × screws; 1912: 2 × quadruple expansion engines; 1916: 2 × triple expansion engines; 1922: 2 × quadruple expansion engines
- Speed: 1912: 17 knots (31 km/h)
- Armament: as armed merchant cruiser: 3 × 4-inch/50-caliber guns

SS Macedonia was a steamship that was built in England in 1912, renamed Pincio in 1922 and scrapped in Italy in 1932. She was built as an ocean liner for Greek owners, but within months of being completed she was converted into an armed merchant cruiser for the Royal Hellenic Navy. An Ottoman warship sank her in 1913 in the First Balkan War.

In 1916 Macedonia's wreck was raised and she was returned to working order for a Dutch tramp company, which operated her until 1922. She then passed to Italian owners who renamed her Pincio. She was scrapped in 1932.

The ship should not be confused with others of the same name. P&O had an ocean liner called Macedonia that was built in 1904. HAPAG had a cargo ship called Macedonia that was built in 1900. Other ships have also borne the same name.

== Building ==
Sir James Laing & Sons built Macedonia at Deptford in Sunderland, County Durham, as yard number 631. She was launched on 11 September 1911 and completed on 22 February 1912. Her registered length was 422.0 ft (128.6 m), her beam was 51.0 ft (15.5 m) and her depth was 23.4 ft (7.1 m). As built, her tonnages were 6,333 GRT and 3,540 NRT.

Macedonia had twin screws, each driven by a quadruple expansion engine built by George Clark, Ltd of Sunderland. The combined power of her twin engines was rated at 1,108 NHP and gave her a speed of 17 knots (31 km/h).

Macedonia was similar in size to Themistocles (1907) and Athinai (1908), both of which belonged to the rival Hellenic Transatlantic Steam Navigation Company. The difference was that her engines were almost twice as powerful.

The National Steam Navigation Company registered the ship on the Aegean island of Andros. Her code letters were HSWN. Her managers were Embiricos Brothers, who had founded the National Steam Navigation Company in 1908.

== Greek ocean liner and auxiliary cruiser ==
Macedonia's transatlantic career lasted only months. On 8 October 1912 the First Balkan War began. The Greek government chartered Macedonia, Themistocles, Athinai and another Greek ship to help prepare for the war. Thousands of Greeks living in the USA, who were either Hellenic Army reservists or volunteers, wanted transport home. But when left New York on 5 October she carried heavy artillery and ammunition from Bethlehem Steel, so by law she was unable to carry steerage passengers.

The Royal Hellenic Navy requisitioned Macedonia and had her converted into an armed merchant cruiser. Her primary armament was three US-made Mark 9 4-inch/50-caliber guns. The navy formed a squadron of four auxiliary cruisers in which she was the largest and newest. On 27 November 1912 she took part in a successful amphibious operation to land troops on Chios in the eastern Aegean, capturing the island from the Ottoman Empire.

Either during or after that operation, Macedonia's steering gear was damaged. She put into port in Ermoupoli, on the Cycladean island of Syros.

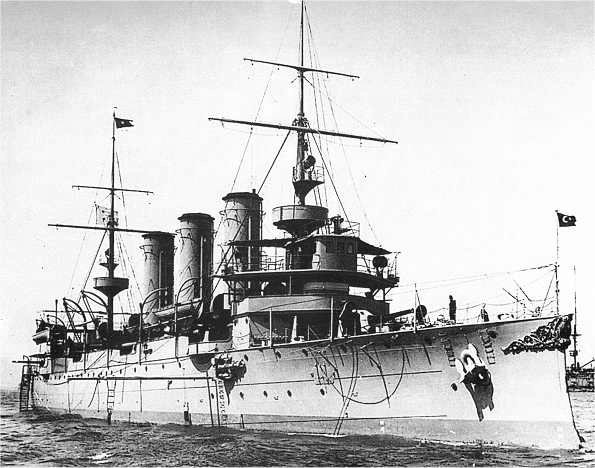
The Ottoman cruiser Hamidiye shelled Macedonia in January 1913

On 14 January 1913 the Ottoman cruiser Hamidiye slipped through the Greek naval blockade of the Dardanelles, and started raiding in the Aegean. The next day she reached Syros and opened fire on Ermoupli with her two QF 6-inch and eight QF 4.7-inch guns. Macedonia was not in steam and so could not move. Hamidiye fired 152 shells, hitting not only Macedonia but also the town.

Macedonia's commander, Captain 2nd Class P Tsoukalis, ordered his crew to scuttle her by opening her Kingston valves. The Turkish commander, Rauf Orbay, concluded that his attack had neutralised Macedonia, and at 1325 hrs Hamidiye sailed away.

The Greek authorities claimed that Macedonia was raised ten days later and taken to Piraeus for repairs. But in fact she never returned to service with either the Navy or the National Steam Navigation Company.

== Dutch cargo ship ==
In 1916 a new Dutch tramp steamship company, Hollandsche Algemeene Atlantische Scheepvaartmaatschappij, was formed. It bought Macedonia for three million guilders and had her towed to Rotterdam, where the Machinefabriek voorheen onder de firma B. Wilton repaired her. A pair of triple expansion engines was installed. Like her original engines they were built by George Clark, Ltd. But they were far less powerful, being rated at only 500 NHP.

Hollandsche Algemeene Atlantische SM changed Macedonia's port of registration to Amsterdam. Her Dutch code letters were PJTN. She worked as a cargo ship until the company went bankrupt in 1922.

== Italian ocean liner ==
Lloyd Latino, an Italian subsidiary of the French Société Générale de Transports Maritimes, bought Macedonia and had her restored to passenger service. A pair of George Clark engines, either her original ones or a new pair with the same dimensions, was installed. Their power was now rated at 913 NHP. Lloyd Latino renamed the ship Pincio and changed her port of registry to Genoa. Her Italian code letters were PCUI.

Lloyd Latino ran passenger services between Mediterranean ports and South America. In 1928 Pincio's route was Genoa – Marseille – Rio de Janeiro – Santos – Montevideo – Buenos Aires. Her outward voyages also included calls at Valencia and Almeria in Spain and optionally at Dakar in French West Africa. Her return voyages included a call at Las Palmas.

Pincio was scrapped early in 1932 at La Spezia in northern Italy.

== Bibliography ==
- Lloyd's Register of British and Foreign Shipping. Vol. II–Steamers. London: Lloyd's Register of Shipping. 1912. MAB–MAC – via Internet Archive.
- Lloyd's Register of Shipping. Vol. II–Steamers. London: Lloyd's Register of Shipping. 1920. MAC – via Internet Archive.
- Lloyd's Register of Shipping. Vol. II–Steamers and Motor Vessels. London: Lloyd's Register of Shipping. 1923. PIE–PIN – via Internet Archive.
- Lloyd's Register of Shipping. Vol. II–Steamers and Motorships. London: Lloyd's Register of Shipping. 1928. PIJ–PIN – via Internet Archive.
- Lloyd's Register of Shipping (PDF). Vol. II–Steamers and Motorships of 300 Tons Gross and Over. London: Lloyd's Register of Shipping. 1932. PIN – via Southampton City Council.
