= Emmanuel Kriaras =

Greek lexicographer and philologist

- Εμμανουήλ Κριαράς
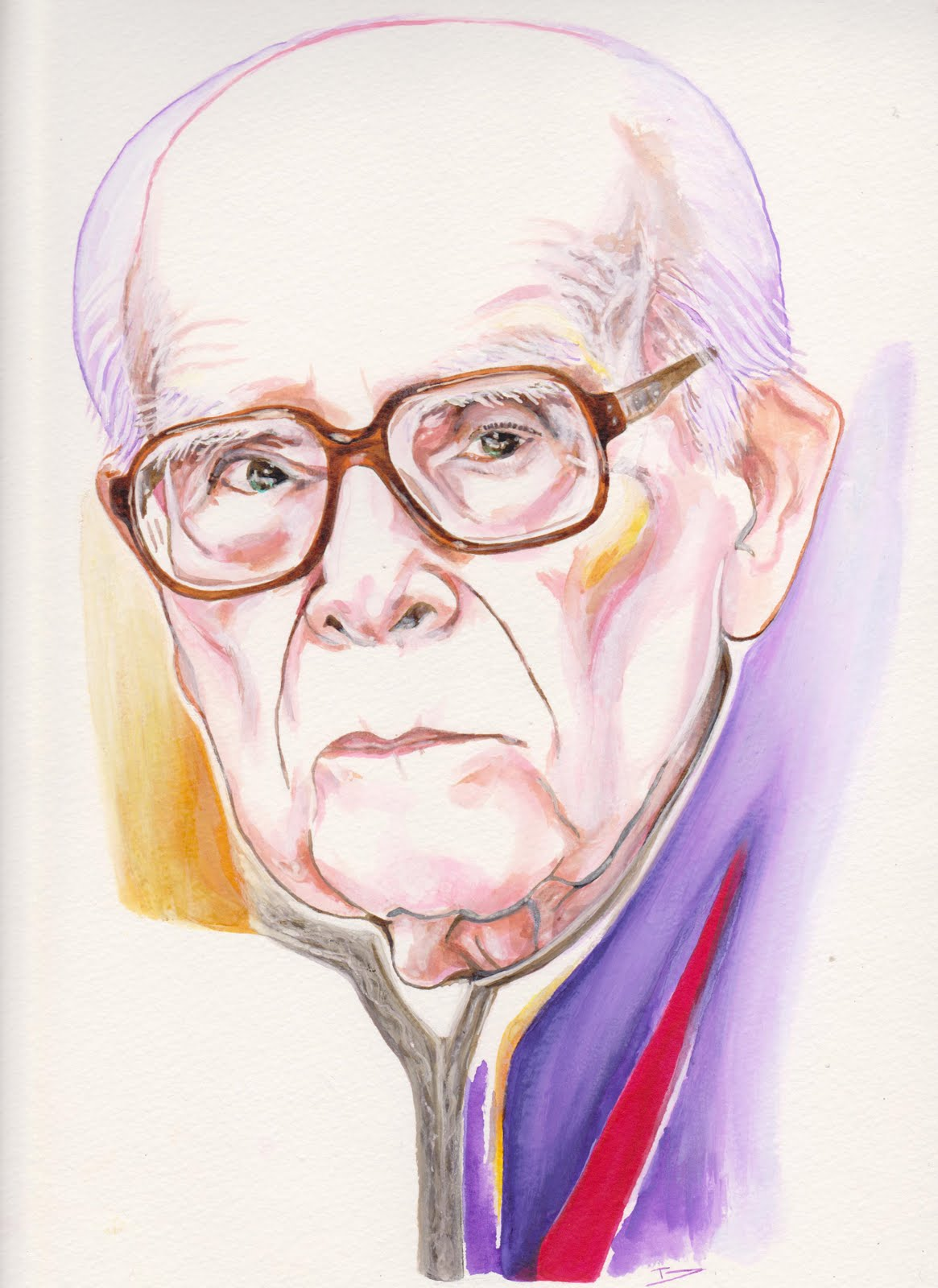
- Portrait of Emmanuel Kriaras
- Born: 28 November 1906; Piraeus, Attica, Greece
- Died: 22 August 2014 (aged 107); Thessaloniki, Macedonia, Greece
- Education: University of Athens
- Occupations: Lexicographer; philologist; professor; linguist
- Employer: University of Thessaloniki
- Spouse: Aikaterini Striftou (m. 1936; died 2000)
- Awards: Herder Prize (1977); Order of the Phoenix; Order of George I Order of Honour; Legion of Honour; Order of Merit of the Italian Republic

Signature
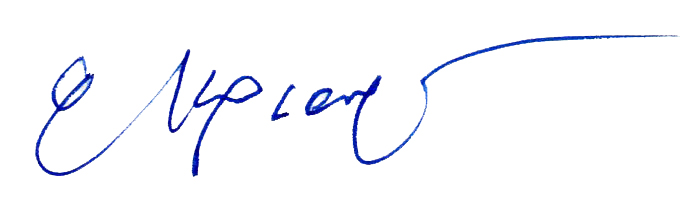

Emmanuel G. Kriaras (Greek: Εμμανουήλ Γ. Κριαράς; 28 November 1906 – 22 August 2014) was a Greek lexicographer, philologist, professor and linguist. He was Professor Emeritus of the School of Philosophy at the Aristotle University of Thessaloniki. He was a student of Jean Psychari and the practice and ideology of demotic Greek.

== Early life and education ==
Kriaras was born in Piraeus in Attica, Greece, on 28 November 1906 to a family of Cretan origin and spent his early childhood on the island of Milos, the southwesternmost of the Cyclades. In 1914 his family moved to Chania, Crete, where he completed his secondary education. He studied at the University of Athens from 1924, where he graduated from the School of Philosophy in 1929.

== Professional life ==
Kriaras worked in the medieval archives of the Academy of Athens, where he started in 1930. He was appointed principal in 1939. While working at the Academy he carried out post-graduate research, his work included periods in Munich (1930) and Paris (1945 (Note: He moved to France in December 1945 along with many other Greek intellectuals on the Mataroa voyage.)–1948). Some of his research was on Erotókritos the early 17th century romantic epic which represents the high point of renaissance literature in Crete. This work was published in 1938 as Essays concerning the sources of Erotókritos (Μελετήματα περί τας πηγάς του Ερωτοκρίτου) for which he was awarded his doctorate by the University of Athens. In 1950 he was elected to the chair of Medieval Greek Philology at the Aristotle University of Thessaloniki. In addition to the main courses on his subject, he taught medieval Greek history and modern Greek philology until 1968 when his political views resulted in his dismissal by the right wing military junta.

His writings cover a wide field. Probably his most important work has been the Lexicon of Medieval Greek Demotic Literature 1100-1669 (Λεξικό της μεσαιωνικής ελληνικής δημώδους γραμματείας 1100-1669), published since 1968 and now supplemented with a 2-volume condensed edition. In 1997 he entrusted his medieval lexicon and its associated archives to the Centre for the Greek Language (Thessaloniki). His Greek Dictionary of the Modern Demotic Language, Written and Oral (Νέο ελληνικό λεξικό της σύγχρονης ελληνικής δημοτικής γλώσσας, γραπτής και προφορικής) (1995) is the most authoritative modern Greek monolingual dictionary. Kriaras worked on, and promoted research in, the problems related to medieval and modern Greek philology, lexicography and comparative grammatology, with his heart in the demotic language and the movements connected with its promotion. His wife, Aikaterini Striftou-Kriara, to whom he had been married since 1936, died on 1 May 2000, aged 94.

In 2006, in recognition of his work and to mark his 100th birthday, he was awarded the "Golden Aristotle" by the University of Thessaloniki.

== Death ==
Kriaras died from heart attack, on 22 August 2014, in Thessaloniki, aged 107.
