= Miltiadès Papamiltiadès =

Greek anatomist

- Born: Miltiadès Papamiltiadès; 1910; Amfikleia, Greece
- Died: 1987
- Occupation: Anatomist
- Known for: Lymphatic system

Miltiadès Papamiltiadès (Greek: Μιλτιάδης Παπαμιλτιάδης; 1910–1987) was a Greek anatomist known for his studies of the lymphatic system. He was among the passengers of Mataroa in 1945, fleeing from Greece to France among with many Greek intellectuals to escape the White Terror.
