= SS Demosthenes (1911) =

British ocean liner

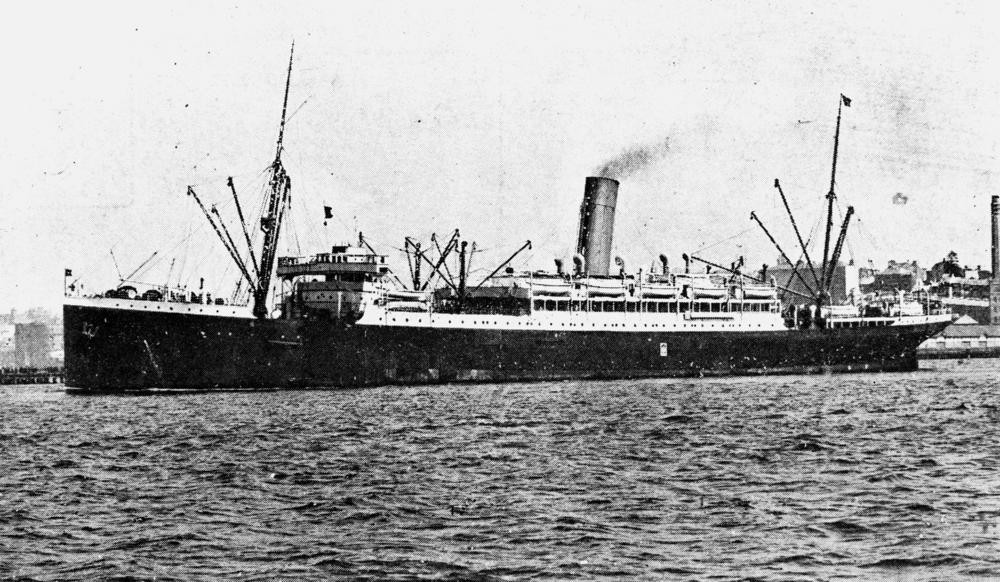
- Demosthenes leaving Sydney

History

United Kingdom
- Name: Demosthenes
- Namesake: Demosthenes
- Owner: George Thompson & Co Ltd
- Operator: Aberdeen Line
- Port of registry: Aberdeen
- Route: London – Cape Town – Melbourne
- Builder: Harland and Wolff, Belfast
- Yard number: 418
- Launched: 28 February 1911
- Completed: 5 August 1911
- Maiden voyage: 31 August 1911
- Identification: UK official number 129362; code letters HTFB; call sign MGK; Pennant number A64 (1915–17)
- Fate: Scrapped 18 October 1931

General characteristics
- Type: Ocean liner
- Tonnage: 11,223 GRT, 7,034 NRT
- Length: 500.6 ft (152.6 m)
- Beam: 62.3 ft (19.0 m)
- Draught: 29 ft 6 in (8.99 m)
- Depth: 39.4 ft (12.0 m)
- Decks: 2
- Installed power: 1,358 NHP
- Propulsion: 2 × triple-expansion steam engines; 1 × low-pressure steam turbine; 3 × screws
- Speed: 15 knots (28 km/h)
- Capacity: 100 first class berths; 1,200 third class berths; 212,019 cubic feet (6,004 m^{3}) refrigerated cargo
- Sensors & processing systems: submarine signalling
- Notes: sister ships: Pericles, Themistocles

SS Demosthenes was a UK steam ocean liner and refrigerated cargo ship. She was launched in 1911 in Ireland for Aberdeen Line and scrapped in 1931 in England. In the First World War she was an Allied troop ship.

Aberdeen Line named some of its ships after classical Greek people and events. Demosthenes was a statesman and orator in Classical Athens in the fourth century BC.

== Building ==
Harland and Wolff built Demosthenes on its slipway number five in Belfast, launching her on 28 February 1911 and completing her on 5 August. She was a sister ship of Pericles, which was launched in 1907, and Themistocles, which was launched in 1910.

Watertight bulkheads divided Demosthenes' hull into 11 watertight compartments. She was designed to stay afloat if any two were flooded.

Demosthenes had berths for 100 first class passengers on her bridge deck and awning deck, and 1,200 third class passengers on her poop deck, main deck and tween deck. All of her passenger cabins were "outside cabins" with at least one porthole. Her public areas included a verandah café, library, lounge, social hall and smoking room.

Her holds were refrigerated and had capacity for 212,019 cubic feet (6,004 m^{3}) of cargo. They had a total of seven hatches, served by 17 winches.

From new, Demosthenes was equipped for wireless telegraphy and her navigation equipment included submarine signalling. The Marconi Company operated her wireless on the 300 and 600 metre wavelengths. Her call sign was MGK.

=== Engines ===
Demosthenes differed from her sisters by having a more modern propulsion system. Pericles and Themistocles each had twin screws driven by quadruple-expansion steam engines whose combined power output was rated at 1,075 NHP.

Demosthenes had three screws. A pair of four-cylinder triple-expansion steam engines drove her port and starboard screws. Exhaust steam from their low-pressure cylinders powered a low-pressure steam turbine that drove her middle screw. Harland and Wolff built her triple-expansion engines. John Brown & Company built her low-pressure turbine. The combined power output of her three engines was rated at 1,358 NHP, which was 26 per cent more than her sisters, and gave her a speed of 15 knots (28 km/h).

The combination of piston engines with a low-pressure turbine had been pioneered in 1908 in the cargo liner Otaki built by William Denny and Brothers, and the transatlantic liner Laurentic built by Harland and Wolff. Laurentic proved more economical than her sister ship Megantic, which led a number of shipping lines and shipbuilders to choose a combination of piston engines and exhaust turbines for passenger and cargo liners.

== Service ==
Aberdeen Line ran scheduled services between London and Australia via Cape Town. The company advertised Demosthenes as "the first turbine steamer trading between England and Australia". In August 1911 The Times more accurately described her as the first ship with a combination of reciprocating and turbine engines on the England – South Africa – Australia route.

Demosthenes' maiden voyage was scheduled for 31 August 1911. She sailed from Royal Albert Dock, London and was scheduled to call at Plymouth, Tenerife and Cape Town on her way to Melbourne. Her voyage was scheduled to take 40 days but she completed it in 36.

=== Troop ship ===
In 1915 the Commonwealth of Australia requisitioned the ship as HMAT Demosthenes, with the pennant number A64. She sailed in five convoys from Australia carrying elements of the First Australian Imperial Force for service overseas. On 17 July 1915 she left Melbourne carrying 1,352 troops as part of Convoy 9. On the same trip she called at Fremantle, embarked another 159 troops, and sailed on 23 July.

On 29 December 1915 Demosthenes left Melbourne carrying 1,598 troops as part of Convoy 16. On 18 May 1916 she left Sydney carrying 1,610 troops as part of Convoy 21. On 22 December 1916 she left Sydney carrying 1,240 troops and 46 naval officers as part of Convoy 27.

Commonwealth Government control of Demosthenes ended on 16 March 1917. However, on 9 November 1917 Demosthenes left Sydney carrying 78 troops and nine nurses as part of Convoy 35.

On 17 August 1918 Demosthenes sailed from Quebec carrying troops including a party of 35 officers of the 69th Regiment, United States Army Coast Artillery Corps. She crossed the Atlantic, reaching Liverpool on 2 September.

=== Post-war service ===
On 19 August 1920 Demosthenes resumed civilian sailings between London and Australia. Her post-war route included Brisbane.

Shaw, Savill & Albion Line and White Star Line jointly owned Aberdeen Line. In 1928 White Star took over Commonwealth Line and merged it with Aberdeen Line. Demosthenes' route was changed to serve Liverpool instead of London.

On 29 April 1931 Demosthenes suffered a fire in her forward bunkers. She was at sea, 950 nautical miles (1,760 km) west of Fremantle en route to Liverpool. The fire was brought under control, but her Master decided to turn back to Australia.

On 20 July 1931 the Royal Mail Case opened at the Old Bailey, which led to the collapse of White Star Line's parent company. Demosthenes was laid up. She was sold for scrap to Hughes Bolckow, and on 18 October 1931 she arrived at Blyth, Northumberland to be broken up.

== Bibliography ==
- Dowling, R (1909) [1903]. All About Ships & Shipping (2nd ed.). London: Alexander Moring Ltd.
- The Marconi Press Agency Ltd (1914). The Year Book of Wireless Telegraphy and Telephony. London: The Marconi Press Agency Ltd.
- Wilson, RM (1956). The Big Ships. London: Cassell & Co.
