= SS Sophocles (1921) =

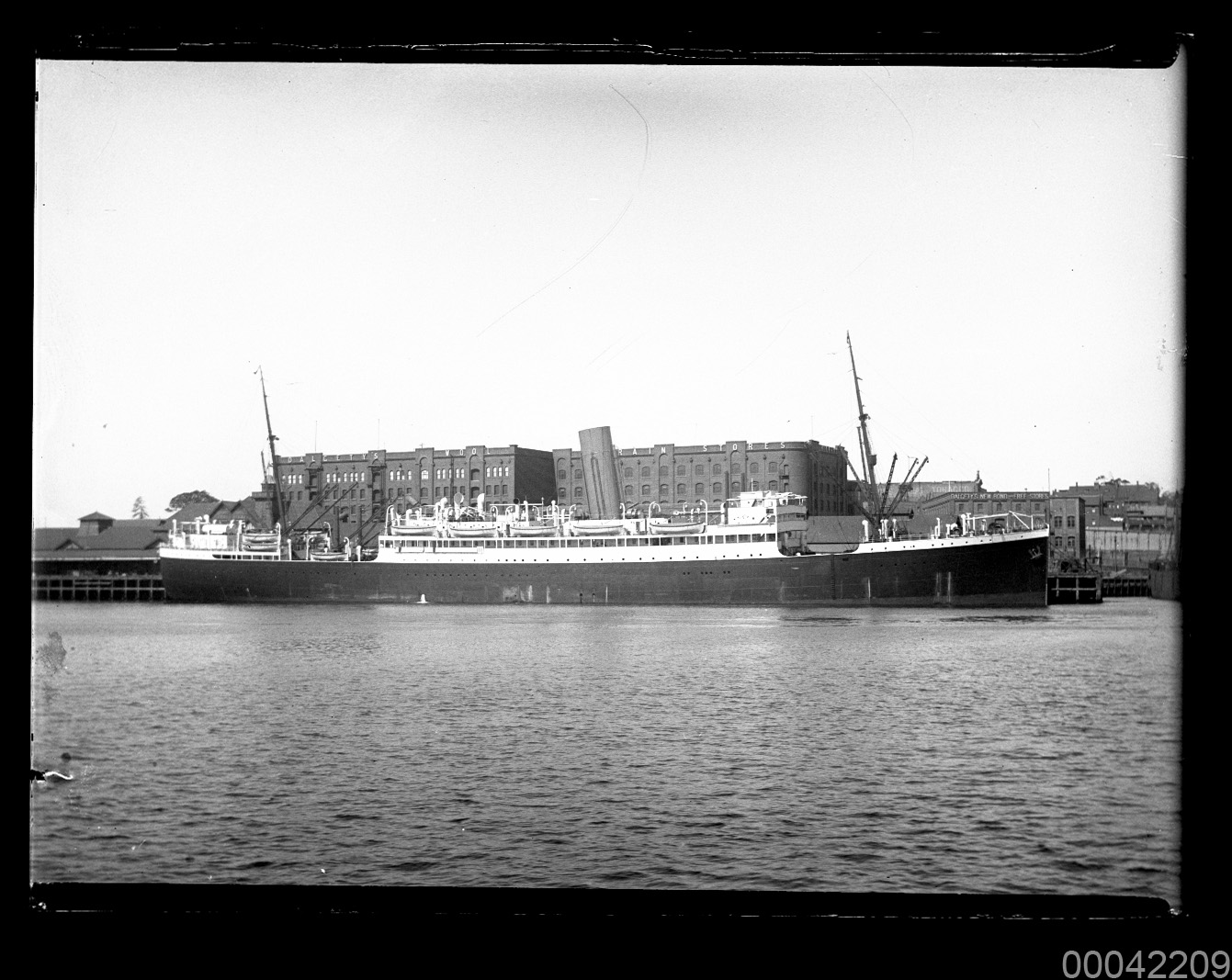
- SS Sophocles at the Aberdeen Wharf at Millers Point, New South Wales, on 10 November 1923

History

United Kingdom
- Name: SS Sophocles; Tamaroa
- Operator: Aberdeen Line (1921–1932); Shaw, Savill & Albion Line (1926–1957)
- Route: UK to New Zealand
- Builder: Harland & Wolff, Belfast
- Yard number: 575
- Launched: 22 September 1921
- Completed: 2 February 1922
- Fate: Scrapped Faslane 1957

General characteristics
- Type: Passenger ship
- Tonnage: 12,375 GRT
- Length: 500 ft 3 in (152.48 m)
- Beam: 63 ft 1 in (19.23 m)
- Depth of hold: 39 ft 6 in (12.04 m)
- Installed power: 5,200 s.h.p.
- Propulsion: 2 × Steam turbines
- Speed: 13.5 knots (25.0 km/h; 15.5 mph)

SS Sophocles was a 12,300-ton ocean liner of the Aberdeen Line launched in 1921, and later sold to the Shaw, Savill & Albion Line.

== Ship history ==
Sophocles was built at the Harland & Wolff yard in Belfast. She and her sister ship SS Diogenes, like other Aberdeen Line ships were conceived primarily as cargo vessels. Sophocles had accommodation for 130 first class and 420 third class passengers.

In 1926, Sophocles and Diogenes were chartered by Shaw, Savill & Albion for the New Zealand trade. The third class accommodation was greatly improved and both ships benefitted from conversion from coal burning to oil, which brought an increase in speed to 15 knots, for the cost of £70,000 each. At this time Sophocles was renamed Tamaroa and Diogenes was renamed Mataroa.

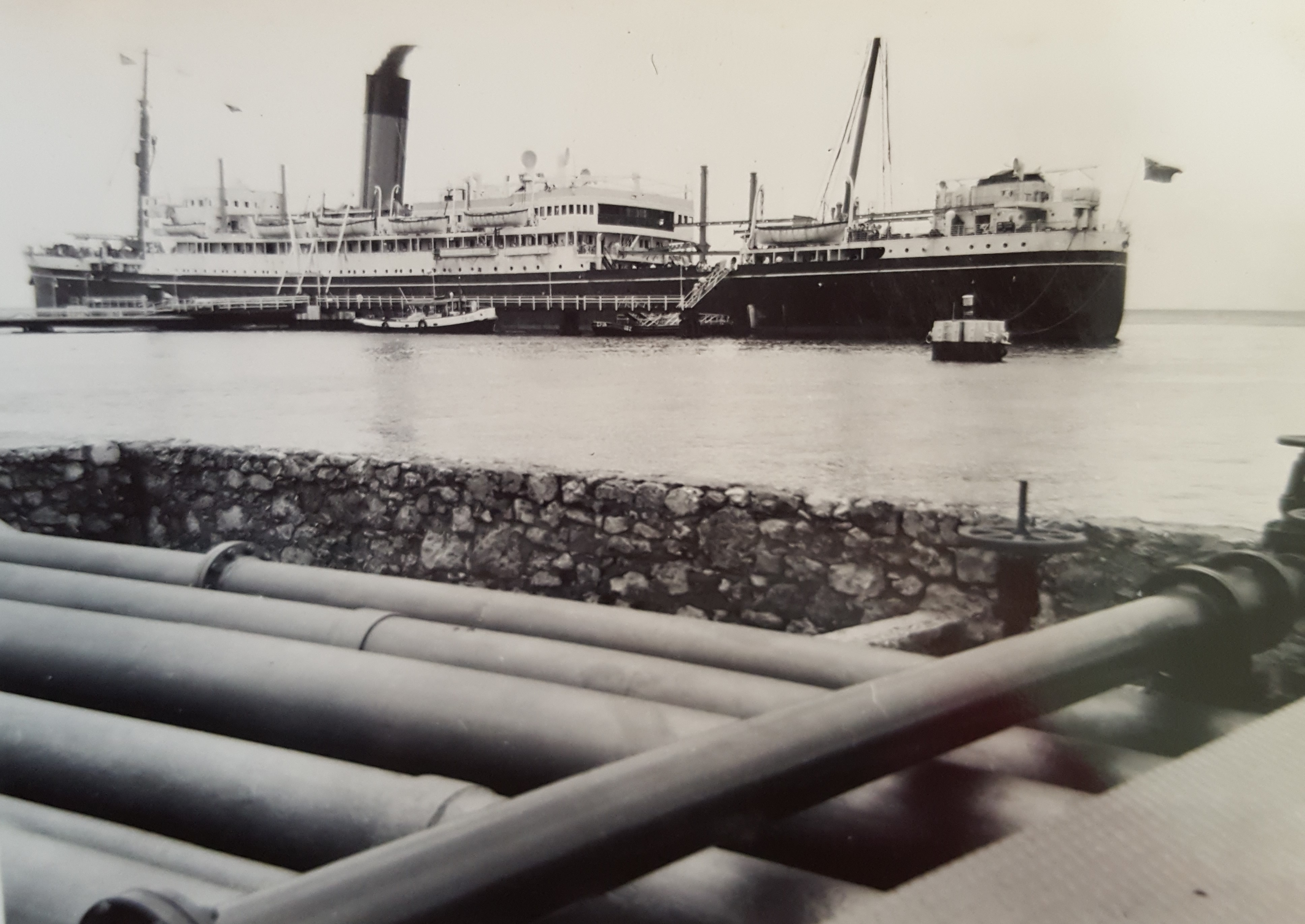
SS Tamaroa refuelling at Curacao in 1956

During World War II Tamaroa served as a troopship during the North African campaign. In the Operational Record Book (ORB) for RAF 11 Squadron the SS Tamaroa is mentioned on 18th September 1945 in an entry that reads:- “The ground party disembarked at Morib Beach in the afternoon after spending 9 days on the S.S. Tamaroa, five at sea. They embarked at Madras. L.C.I’s were used for landing personnel, nearly all of whom had to wade through several feet of water. The baggage party had a dry landing in alligators. The night was spent in rubber plantations just off the beach without cover”. This places the S.S. Tamaroa as a vessel used in Operation Zipper to liberate Malaya from any residual Japanese forces after the Japanese surrender.

At the end of hostilities, she was refitted for tourist class only and served on the UK-Panama Canal-New Zealand route until her scrapping in 1957.
