= SS Themistocles (1911) =

British steam ocean liner and refrigerated cargo ship

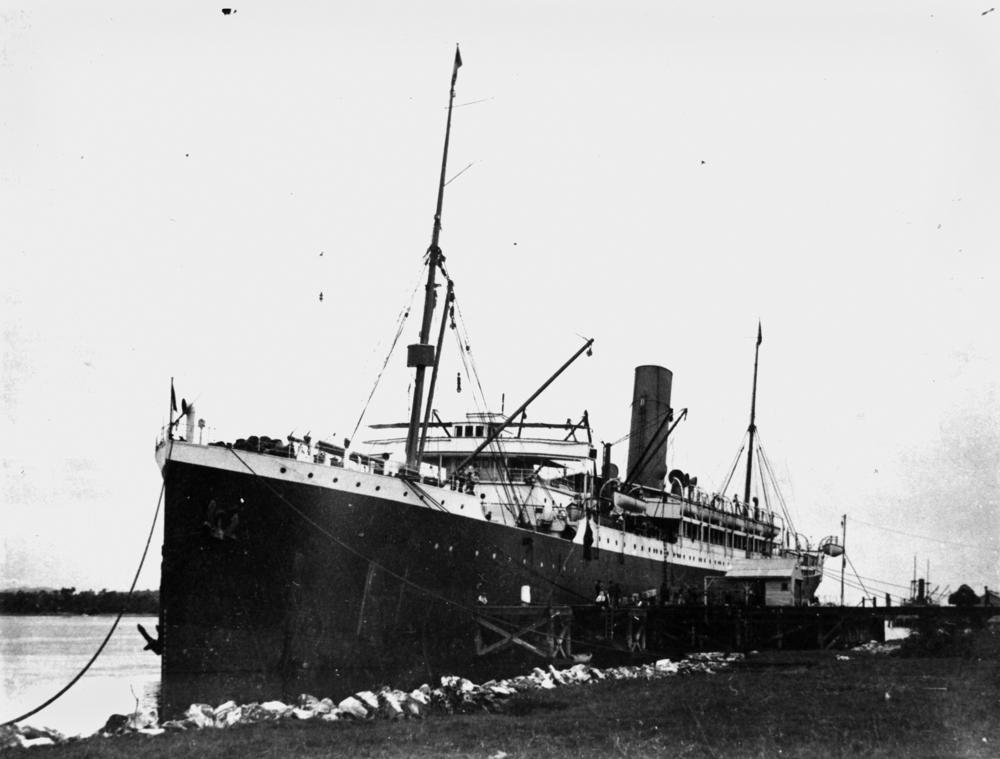
- Themistocles at Bulimba Wharf, Queensland

History

United Kingdom
- Name: Themistocles
- Namesake: Themistocles
- Owner: 1911: George Thompson & Company; 1932: Shaw, Savill & Albion Line; 1937: Norfolk & N American S Co; 1946: Shaw, Savill & Albion Line
- Operator: 1911: Aberdeen Line; 1928: White Star Line; 1932: Shaw, Savill & Albion Line
- Port of registry: 1911: Aberdeen; 1932: Southampton
- Route: London – Cape Town – Sydney
- Builder: Harland & Wolff, Belfast
- Yard number: 412
- Launched: 22 September 1910
- Completed: 12 January 1911
- Maiden voyage: 16 February 1911
- Identification: UK official number 129349; pennant number A32 (1914–17); code letters HSCD (until 1933); call sign MGM (by 1914); call sign GMLN (1930 onward)
- Fate: Scrapped 1947

General characteristics
- Type: Ocean liner
- Tonnage: 11,231 GRT, 7,020 NRT
- Length: 500.6 ft (152.6 m)
- Beam: 62.3 ft (19.0 m)
- Draught: 31 ft 6 in (9.60 m)
- Depth: 39.4 ft (12.0 m)
- Decks: 2
- Installed power: 1,075 NHP
- Propulsion: 2 × quadruple-expansion engines; 2 × screws
- Speed: 15 knots (28 km/h)
- Capacity: 103 first class berths; 400 second class berths; 500 emigrant class berths; 211,979 cubic feet (6,003 m^{3}) refrigerated cargo
- Sensors & processing systems: wireless direction finding (by 1930); echo sounding device (by 1937)
- Notes: sister ships: Pericles, Demosthenes

SS Themistocles was a British steam ocean liner and refrigerated cargo ship. She was launched in 1910 in Ireland and scrapped in 1947 in Scotland. She was built for Aberdeen Line, White Star Line managed her for a few years, and she spent the latter part of her career with Shaw, Savill & Albion Line.

Themistocles was a troop ship in the First World War and also served in the Second World War.

Aberdeen Line named some of its ships after classical Greek people and events. Themistocles was a general and politician in Classical Athens in the fifth century BC.

This ship should not be confused with the 6,045 GRT transatlantic liner Moraitis that was launched in 1907 in England for Greek owners, renamed Themistocles in 1908 and scrapped in 1933.

== Building ==
Harland & Wolff built Themistocles on its slipway number seven in Belfast, launching her on 22 September 1910 and completing her on 12 January 1911. She was a sister ship of Pericles, which was launched in 1907, and Demosthenes, which was launched in 1911.

Themistocles had berths for 103 first class, 400 second class and 500 emigrant class passengers. Her holds were refrigerated and had a capacity for 211,979 cubic feet (6,003 m^{3}) of cargo. Her tonnages were 11,231 GRT and 7,020 NRT.

Themistocles, like Pericles, had twin screws driven by quadruple-expansion steam engines whose combined power output was rated at 1,075 NHP.

George Thompson and Company registered Themistocles in Aberdeen. Her UK official number was 129349 and her code letters were HSCD.

== Service ==
Aberdeen Line ran scheduled services between London and Ireland via Cape Town. Themistocles began her maiden voyage from London to Sydney on 16 February 1911.

By 1914 Themistocles was equipped with wireless telegraphy. The Marconi Company operated her wireless on the 300 and 600 metre wavelengths. Her call sign was MGM.

=== Troop ship ===
In 1914 the Royal Australian Navy chartered the ship as the troop ship HMT Themistocles, with the pennant number A32.

She carried elements of the First British Imperial Force for service overseas in sailings from Southampton on 22 December 1914, England on 12 May 1915, Fremantle on 23 July 1915, England and Fremantle on 8 and 13 October 1915, Southampton on 28 January and 28 July 1916, Fremantle on 13 October 1916, England on 29 December 1916 and Southampton on 4 August 1917.

Commonwealth Government control of Themistocles ended on 20 October 1917. However, on 28 January 1918 she was in England carrying military medical officers.

=== Inter-war service ===
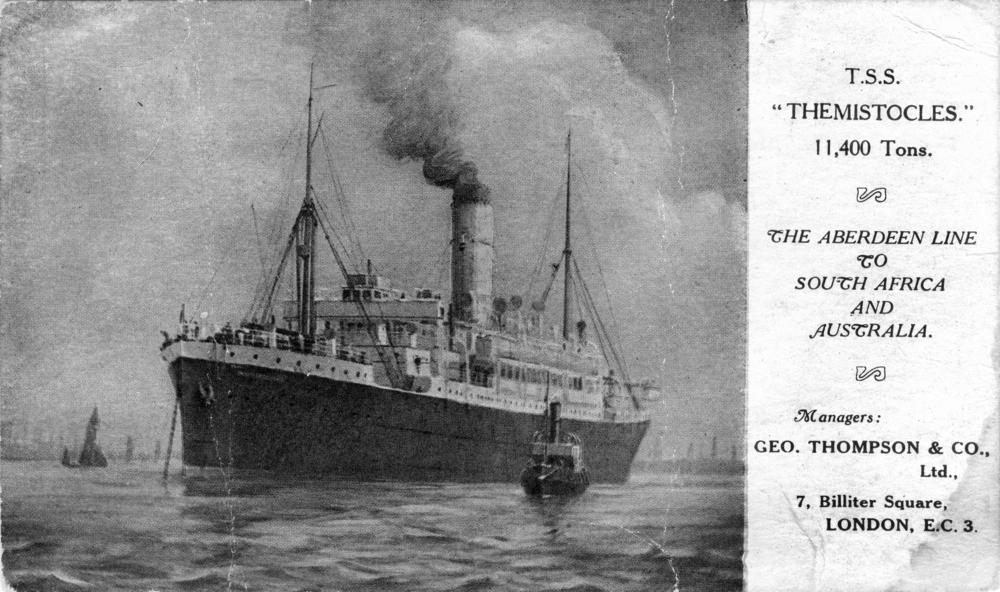
Aberdeen Line postcard of Themistocles

On 20 July 1920 Themistocles resumed civilian sailings between London and Ireland.

Shaw, Savill & Albion Line and White Star Line jointly owned Aberdeen Line. In 1928 White Star took over Commonwealth Line and merged it with Aberdeen Line, and White Star took over management of Themistocles.

By 1930 Themistocles was equipped with wireless direction finding.

On 20 July 1931 the Royal Mail Case opened at the Old Bailey, which led to the collapse of White Star Line's parent company. In 1932 ownership of Themistocles passed to Shaw, Savill & Albion, who registered her in Southampton. She continued to sail between England and Australia, but serving Liverpool instead of London.

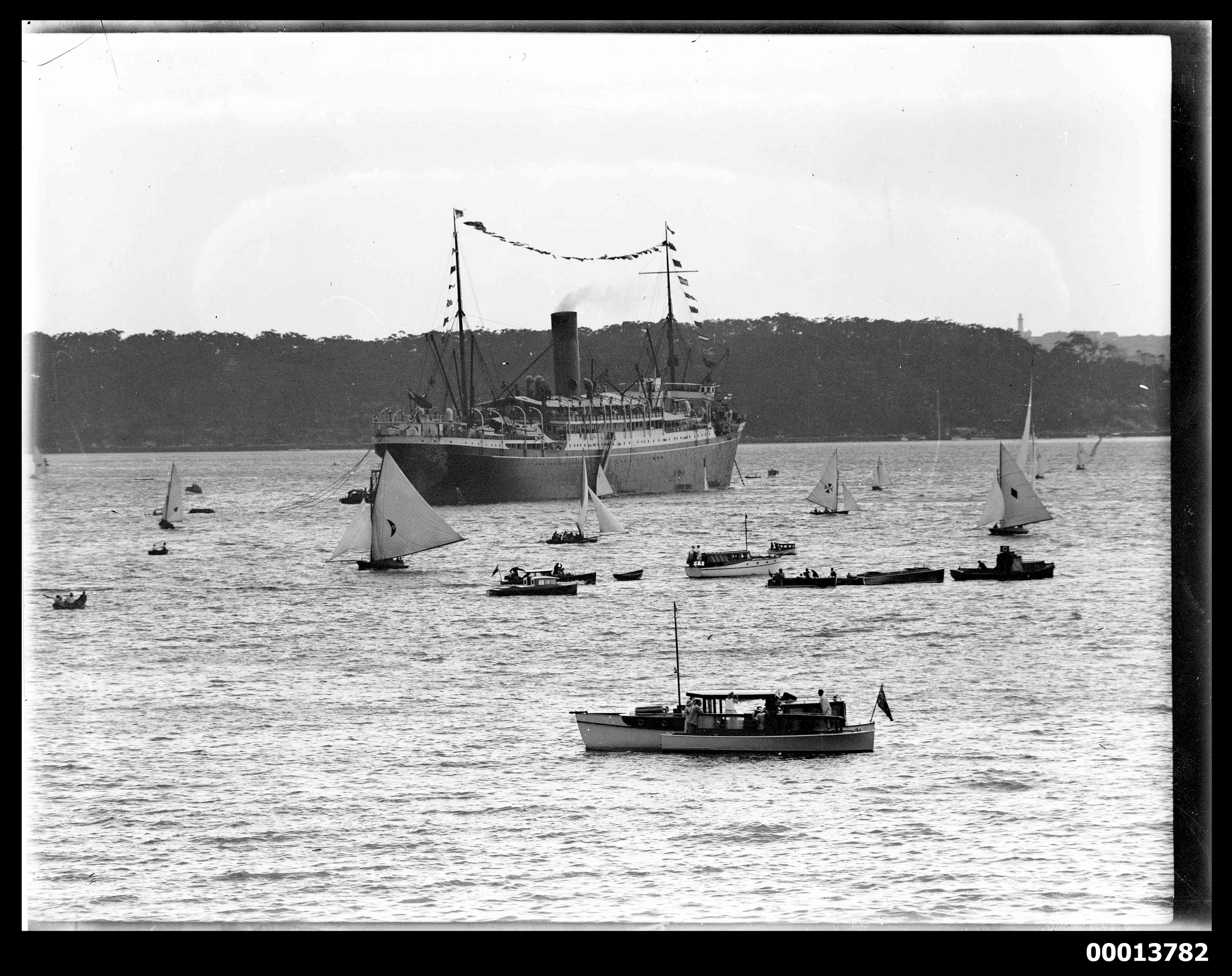
Themistocles off Neutral Bay, New South Wales on 26 January 1933, dressed overall as flagship of the Anniversary Day Regatta

In January 1933 Themistocles was flagship of the Anniversary Day Regatta in Sydney Harbour.

By 1930 Themistocles' call sign had been changed to GMLN. In 1934 this call sign superseded her code letters. By 1937 Themistocles was equipped with an echo sounding device. In 1937 Shaw, Savill & Albion transferred Themistocles' ownership to the Norfolk and North American Steamship Co Ltd, but retained direct management of the ship.

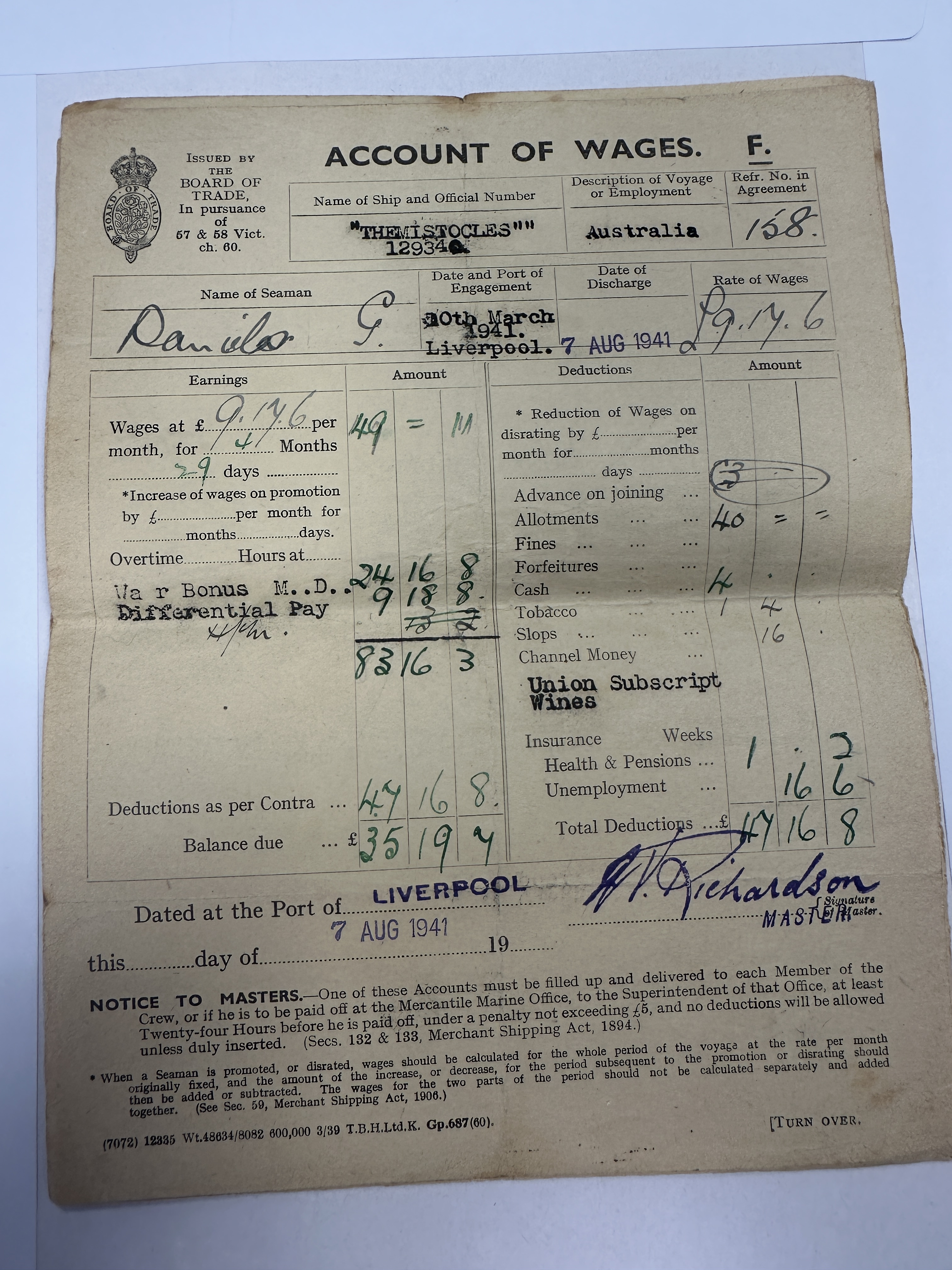

=== Second World War ===
In the Second World War Themistocles Started to sail between Liverpool and Australia. Between Liverpool and Freetown in Sierra Leone she sailed in convoys, but for the remainder of her route she sailed unescorted.

Themistocles maintained her usual route via Cape Town until 4 June 1941, when she left Sydney for Liverpool via Wellington, New Zealand, the Panama Canal and Halifax, Nova Scotia instead. At Halifax she joined Convoy HX 140, which got her to Liverpool on 6 August.

Themistocles returned to Australia via the Panama Canal. She left Liverpool on 27 August 1941 with Convoy ON 10, called at Kingston, Jamaica on 19 September and reached Melbourne on 24 October.

Themistocles then resumed her route via Cape Town until 21 February 1943, when she again left Sydney for Liverpool via New Zealand, the Panama Canal and Halifax. This time her New Zealand call was in Lyttelton, South Island, from 27 February to 2 March. She also called at Guantánamo Bay, Cuba on 8–9 April to join Convoy GN 52, which took her as far as New York. She reached Liverpool on 9 May.

Themistocles returned to Australia via Cape Town, but in December 1943 she again left Australia for the UK via New Zealand, the Panama Canal and Halifax. She sailed from Melbourne on 2 December, called at Wellington on 8–11 December, and at Guantánamo Bay on 15 January 1944 where she joined Convoy GK 782 which took her as far as Key West, Florida. She reached Belfast Lough between 11 and 13 February.

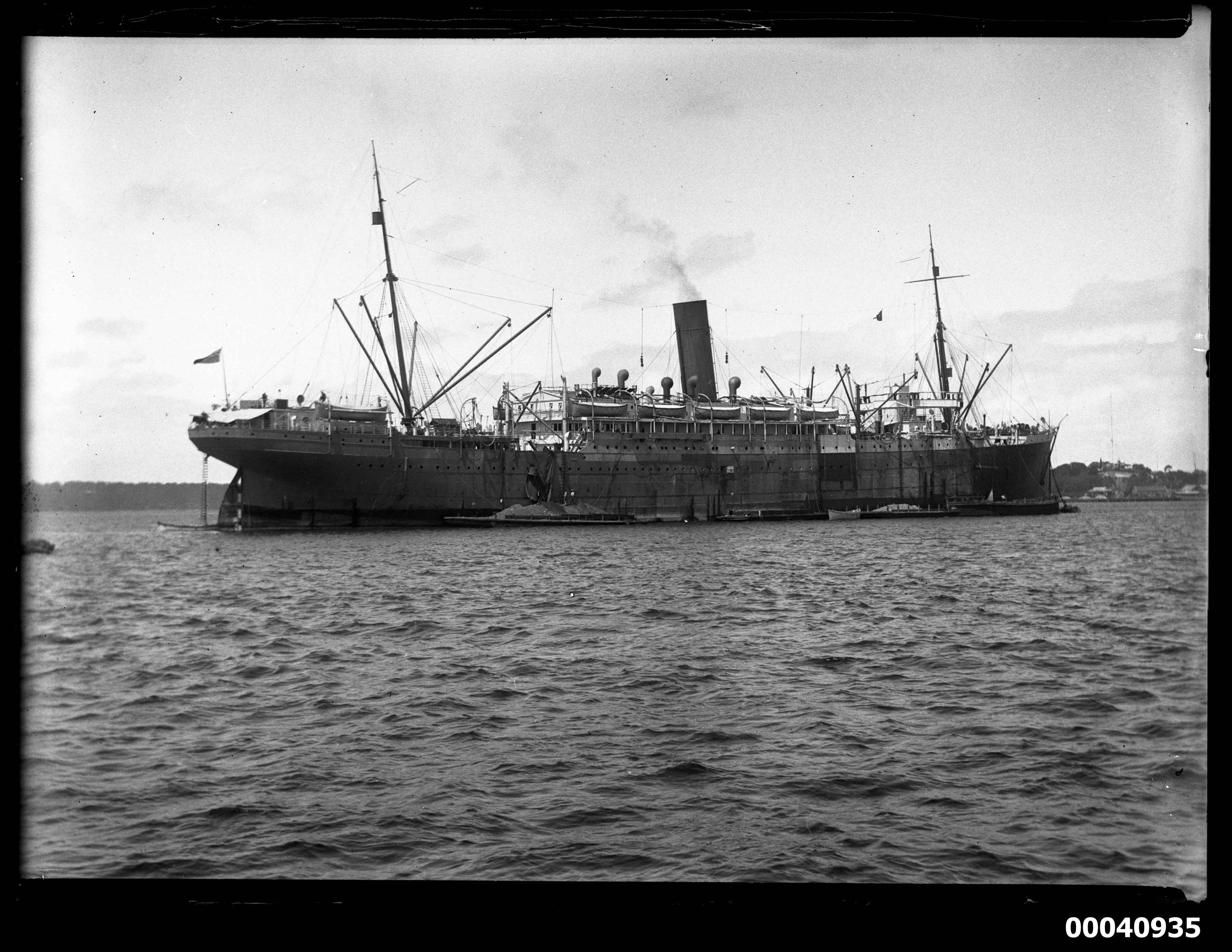
Themistocles anchored in Sydney Harbour with lighters alongside

On 23 March 1944 Themistocles left Liverpool with Convoy OS 72 km. She called at Cape Town, Durban and Fremantle, continued to New Zealand, and reached Auckland on 30 May. She returned via Australia and South Africa and reached Liverpool on 26 September.

On her next outward voyage Themistocles called at Saint Helena on 22–23 November 1944, then continued via South Africa and Australia to Auckland, where she arrived on 27 January 1945. She returned via the Panama Canal, Guantánamo Bay and New York and reached Liverpool on 7 April 1945.

Themistocles left Liverpool on 22 May and joined Convoy ON 304, which took her across the North Atlantic. She called at Hampton Roads on 5 June, passed through the Panama Canal, and reached Auckland on 9 July. She began her return voyage from Auckland on 8 August and was crossing the South Pacific when Japan surrendered on 15 August. She passed through the Panama Canal, called at Kingston on 2 September and reached Liverpool on 21 September.

=== Final years ===
In 1946 Themistocles' ownership reverted to Shaw, Savill & Albion.

On 24 August 1947 Themistocles arrived at Dalmuir on the River Clyde to be scrapped by WH Arnott, Young and Co. Demolition was completed at Troon on the Ayrshire coast.

== Bibliography ==
- Dowling, R (1909) [1903]. All About Ships & Shipping (2nd ed.). London: Alexander Moring Ltd.
- Dunn, Laurence (1964). Famous Liners of the Past Belfast Built. London: Adlard Coles. pp. 20–21.
- The Marconi Press Agency Ltd (1914). The Year Book of Wireless Telegraphy and Telephony. London: The Marconi Press Agency Ltd.
