= Immigration Act of 1907 =

U.S. law restricting entry of immigrants

- Long title: An act to regulate the immigration of aliens into the United States
- Enacted by: the 59th United States Congress

Citations
- Statutes at Large: 34 Stat. 898

Codification
- Acts amended: Immigration Act of 1903

Legislative history
- Introduced in the Senate as S.4403 by William P. Dillingham (R-VT) on February 14, 1906; Committee consideration by United States Senate Committee on Immigration; Passed the Senate on May 23, 1906; Passed the House on June 25, 1906; Reported by the joint conference committee on February 13, 1907; agreed to by the Senate on February 16, 1907 and by the House on February 18, 1907 (193-101); Signed into law by President Theodore Roosevelt on February 20, 1907

The Immigration Act of 1907 was a piece of federal United States immigration legislation passed by the 59th Congress and signed into law by President Theodore Roosevelt on February 20, 1907. The Act was part of a series of reforms aimed at restricting the increasing number and groups of immigrants coming into the U.S. before World War I. The law introduced and reformed a number of restrictions on immigrants who could be admitted into the United States, most notably ones regarding disability and disease.

== Background ==
The administrations of William McKinley (1897-1901) and Theodore Roosevelt (1901-9) were characterized by an increase in the federal government's monitoring and regulating of immigration. The immigration bureaucracy had grown 4200 percent in 15 years, to deal with the new regulations that were required to enforce the Chinese Exclusion Act. Institutions such as Ellis Island, opened in 1892, signaled a new type of United States immigration policy that kept out certain persons that were not deemed fit for entry into the United States, and gave the federal government more control over regulating immigration. The year before that, 1891, immigration continued to grow and new specific restrictions were added to keep out immigrants whom Roger Daniel's describes as "mentally disturbed persons, persons suffering from a 'loathsome or contagious' disease, paupers, persons convicted of a felony or infamous crime or misdemeanor of moral turpitude and polygamists." The presidency of William McKinley also saw the exclusion of those immigrants who advocated for the overthrow of the United States government, giving more room to immigration officials to question and turn immigrants away. This political line of question also went along with the movement of the Bureau of Immigration into the Department of Commerce, and in 1906 Congress gave the immigration officials responsibility for naturalization and made knowledge of English a requirement for naturalization. Additionally, the same year that the Immigration Act of 1907 was passed, Japan and United States entered into a "Gentlemen's Agreement" in which the United States would not restrict Japanese immigration and the Japanese would not allow emigration. This period before the act was passed signaled that the United States government was interested in restricting those types of immigrants that would be viewed as undesirable. These sorts of policies signaled an increasing centralized policy for United States immigration that lead to further legislation being enacted in a more comprehensive manner in 1907.

== Details of the Act ==
As part of a general movement towards limiting the influx of immigrants of the early 20th century, which Roger Daniels has hypothesized to be a "campaign to restrict all immigration", the Immigration Act of 1907 classified another group of people which would be further restricted from entry. Section two of the Act stated that:

All idiots, imbeciles, feebleminded persons, epileptics, insane persons, and persons who have been insane within five years previous; persons who have had two or more attacks of insanity at any time previously; paupers; persons likely to become a public charge; professional beggars; persons afflicted with tuberculosis or with a loathsome or dangerous contagious disease; persons not comprehended within any of the foregoing excluded classes who are found to be and are certified by the examining surgeon as being mentally or physically defective, such mental or physical defect being of a nature which may affect the ability of such alien to earn a living…

These types of regulations had been first introduced in 1882 alongside the Chinese Exclusion Act to ban all "lunatics, idiot, or any person unable to take care of him or herself without becoming a public charge", making lack of able-bodied status or illness as grounds for turning persons away. The 1907 act, however, changed the language to "likely to become a public charge" which Douglas Baynton argues "considerably lowered the threshold for exclusions and expanded the latitude of immigration officials to deny entry." The 1907 act also went further than the statues before it, automatically excluding "imbeciles" and "feeble-minded persons" adding to the 1903 ban already enforced on epileptics and "idiots." To prevent disease for entering, section eleven of the act expanded on the ban of infected persons by stipulating that a medical examiner could turn away the person and any other immigrant accompanying them. This addition of multiple disabilities and specific diseases within the language of the legislation expanded the power of commissioners and medical examiners to determine and turn away those seen to be unsuited for entry into the United States on the basis of their mental and physical status.

Section 2 of the act also expanded the definition of moral character, adding to the political provision of 1903 by banning "persons who have been convicted of or admit having committed a felony or other crime or misdemeanor involving moral turpitude; polygamists, or persons who admit their belief in the practice of polygamy, anarchists, or persons who believe in or advocate the overthrow by force or violence of the Government of the United States, or of all government, or of all forms of law, or the assassination of public officials; persons coming for immoral purposes..." This ban reinforced the fear of political sedition as well as furthering targeting women suspected as prostitutes, along with the Chinese Exclusion Act of 1882 by referencing persons who were coming over for "immoral purposes. Already polygamy had been referenced in a statue in 1891 but 1907 once again broadened the definition of not only a polygamist, but a person who believed in the practice. Section two also continued a previously enforced ban on persons entering for contract labor, which had previously been outlawed but was now grounds for exclusion. While these provisions had been put in place earlier, this act refined the definition of those immigrants who could be lawfully turned away.

Other measures included a section twelve provision that required that incoming ships detail the age, gender, national origin, occupation, and place of residence of all passengers that were coming into the United States to allow a more through registry of departures that could be used for statistical purposes. Section nine also made it unlawfully for any person to transport such banned classes of "imbeciles." The first section of the act increased the head tax to four dollars a person, to be placed in the "immigration fund" which could be used for departures of any person who entered unlawfully, became a public charge in three years, or "to be used under the direction of the Secretary of Commerce and Labor to defray the expense of regulating the immigration of aliens into the United States under said laws.

The act's long-term consequences came from Section 39, which created the United States Congress Joint Immigration Commission. Its goal was to create reports which outlined to Congress the status of immigration, and the need to refine laws. This commission would go on make recommendations which led to the quota system in the Immigration Act of 1924 and more restrictions on Asian and unskilled laborers immigration.
