= Aberdeen Line =

Shipping company founded in 1825 by George Thompson

House flag of the Aberdeen Line

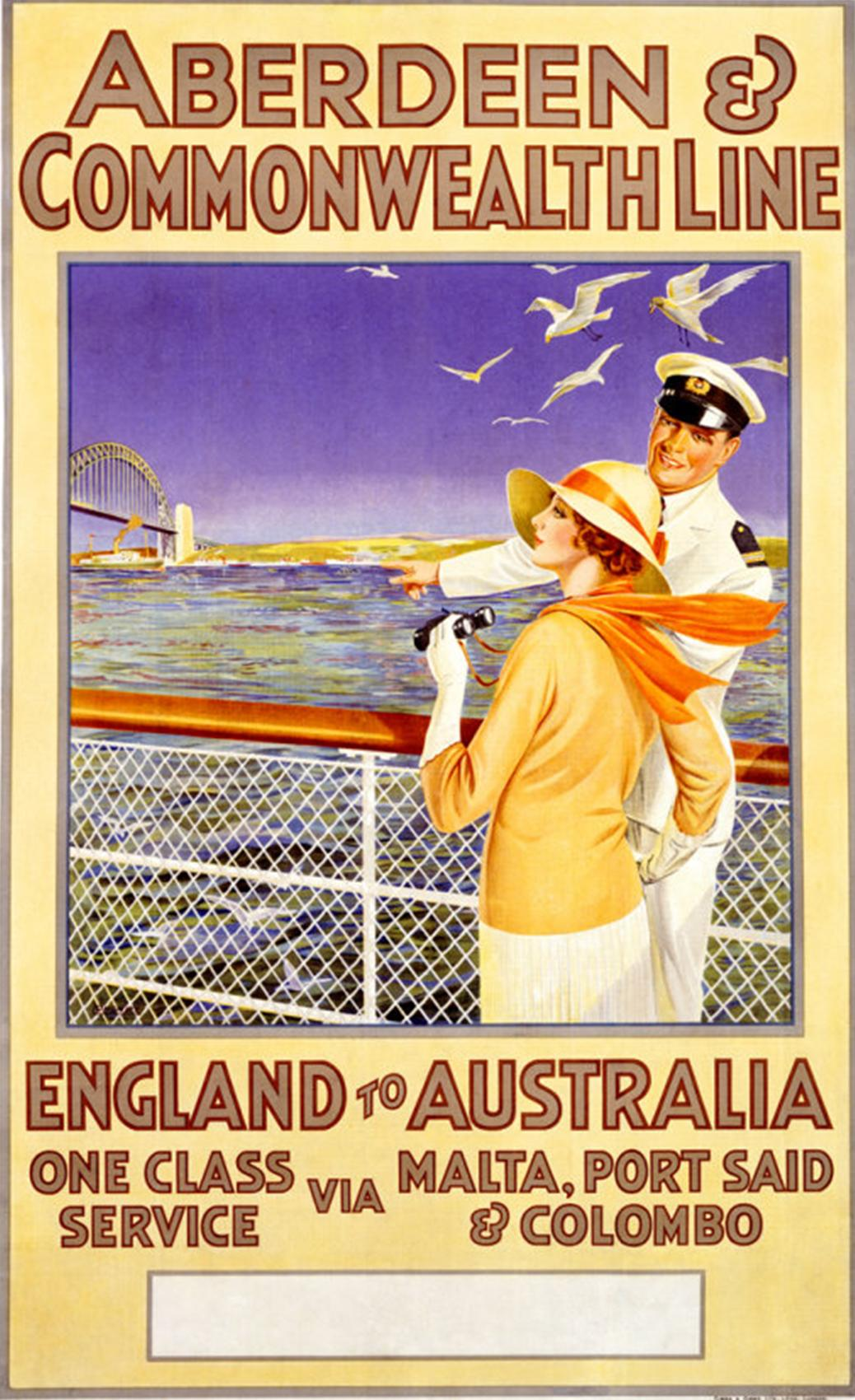
1933 poster advertising the Aberdeen and Commonwealth Line

The Aberdeen Line was a British shipping company founded in 1825 by George Thompson of Aberdeen to take sailing vessels to the St. Lawrence River, carrying some passengers and returning with cargoes of timber. The business flourished and grew to 12 sailing vessels by 1837, travelling to South America, the Pacific, West Indies and the Mediterranean. In 1842 the line included a regular schedule from London to Australia.

The Aberdeen Line’s best known sailing ship was the clipper Thermopylae, launched in 1868, and constructed with the ‘Aberdeen Bow’, designed for greater speed and seaworthiness. The clipper set new records for voyages to and from Australia and the Far East. In 1872, her nearest rival, Cutty Sark, lost by seven days in a race from Shanghai to London. Thermopylae was acknowledged to be the fastest sailing ship afloat.

The arrival of the steamship signalled the end of the sailing era, but enabled the line to introduce a regular service between London and Australia in 1882 with SS Aberdeen, the first merchant vessel with a successful triple-expansion steam engine. Commercial steam to Australia was not a realistic option until this new engine type provided the necessary fuel economy. By 1899 all the vessels were able to carry frozen produce. Changing fortunes put the company under joint control of White Star Line and Shaw, Savill & Albion Line in 1905, while retaining a degree of autonomy. In 1928 the White Star Line took over the Government-owned Australian Commonwealth Line, but in 1931 White Star Line's holding company, the Kylsant shipping group, collapsed. A year later Shaw, Savill & Albion bought the Aberdeen Line and in 1933 the former Australian Commonwealth Line was incorporated and the Aberdeen and Commonwealth Line was founded. Furness Withy took over Shaw Savill & Albion in 1936. By 1957 the last of the ships was scrapped and the company dissolved.
