= Leeuwin =

Leeuwin (Dutch for "lioness") may refer to:

== Places ==
- Leeuwin, Western Australia, a locality in Western Australia
- Cape Leeuwin, the most south-westerly point of Australia
  - Cape Leeuwin Lighthouse
  - Cape Leeuwin water wheel
- Leeuwin-Naturaliste National Park, the national park in which Cape Leeuwin is located
- Leeuwin Barracks, formerly HMAS Leeuwin (naval base), a Royal Australian Navy shore base in North Fremantle

== Ships ==
- Leeuwin (galleon), Dutch galleon that encountered south-west Australia in 1622
- HMAS Leeuwin (A 245), a hydrographic survey ship
  - Leeuwin class survey vessel, the class of HMAS Leeuwin
- STS Leeuwin II, a Western Australian sail training ship

== Other uses ==
- Leeuwin Current, a warm ocean current flowing down the west coast of Australia
- Leeuwin triplefin (Norfolkia leeuwin), a species of small fish of the family Tripterygiidae
- Leeuwin (journal), a short-lived literary journal published in Western Australia by Willem Siebenhaar in 1910
- Leeuwin Estate, a winery in Margaret River, Western Australia
- Leeuwin Estate Concert Series, an annual open-air event featuring international and Australian performers at Leeuwin Estate Winery
