= Seal Island (St Alouarn Islands) =

Island near Augusta, Western Australia in the South West region

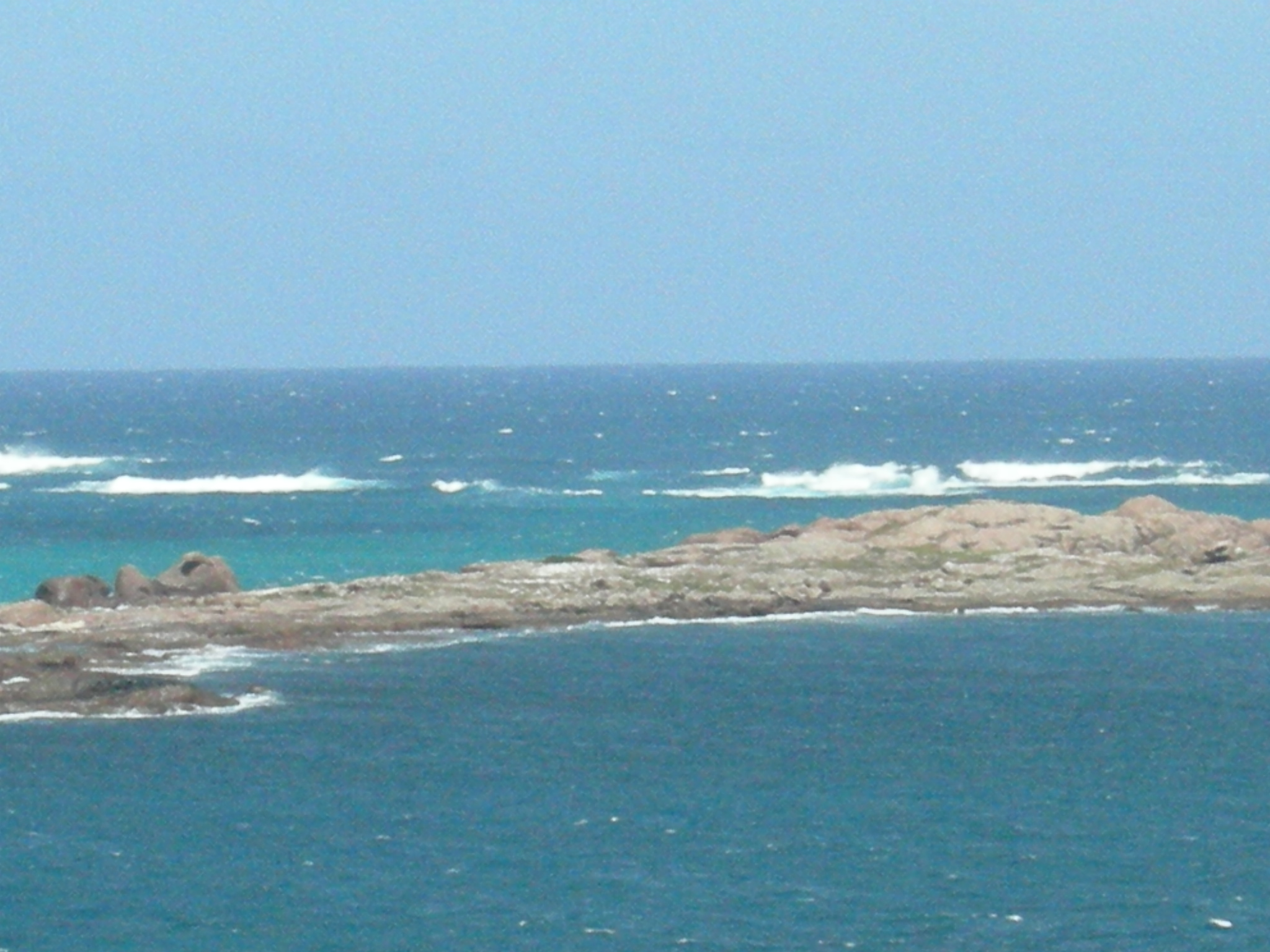
Seal Island in 2007 with a south westerly wind, near Cape Leeuwin

Seal Island (34°22′51″S 115°9′18″E) is located near Augusta, Western Australia in the South West region.

It is located just east of Cape Leeuwin, and lies closer to land than Saint Alouarn Island which lies further to the south.

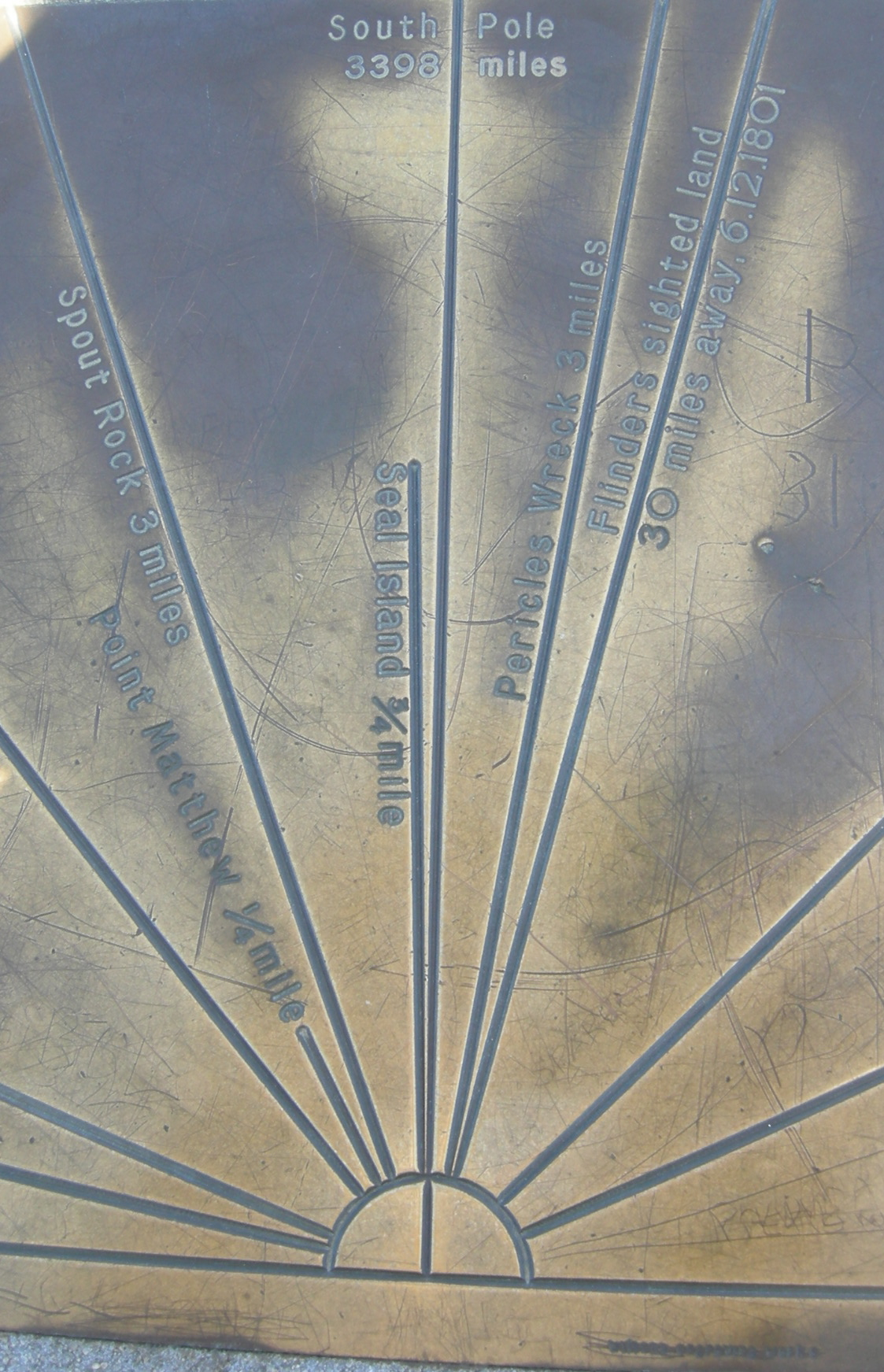
Point Matthew lookout plaque – Seal Island indicated in middle

The Point Matthew lookout is the highest point of land on the road leading to the Cape Leeuwin Lighthouse. It is the location of a plaque commemorating Captain Matthew Flinders' circumnavigation of the continent in 1801–1803.

Seal Island is very low lying, and is small in area close to 5.5 hectares (14 acres). It can be awash in severe weather. When viewed from beaches at sea level on adjacent coast, its height above sea level is negligible, however one map shows 9 metres maximum height of any part of the rock.

It was vested as an A class reserve with the WA Wildlife Authority in 1960 for the conservation of fauna and its name was slightly altered in 1972, and 1979.

Murray and Hercock consider its naming was by Vancouver in 1791, however, it is located near a series of unmarked and barely detectable below surface rocks (the reason for the sinking of the SS Pericles in 1913), however the name was also recorded by Archdeacon in 1878.

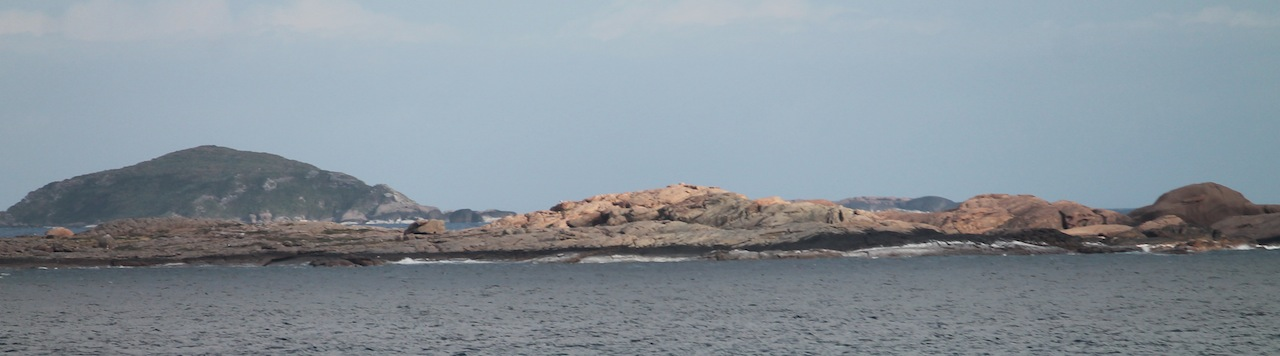
Looking across Seal Island (in foreground) to St Alouarn Island (at left and rear) on a calm day and low tide in 2013
