= St Alouarn Islands =

Island group near Cape Leeuwin

St Alouarn Islands are a group of islands and rocks south-east of Cape Leeuwin in Western Australia, approximately 11 km south of Augusta in Flinders Bay.

== History ==
In March 1772, the crew of the French naval vessel Le Gros Ventre, commanded by Louis Aleno de St Aloüarn, became the first Europeans known to have visited the islands. A few weeks later, at Dirk Hartog Island, St Aloüarn formally claimed part of Western Australia for France. The islands were named after St Aloüarn in 1792, by Antoine d'Entrecasteaux, as the leader of a subsequent French expedition.

== Location ==
The Point Matthew lookout on the road between Augusta and Cape Leeuwin has the islands identified in a brass compass plate that also identifies distances.

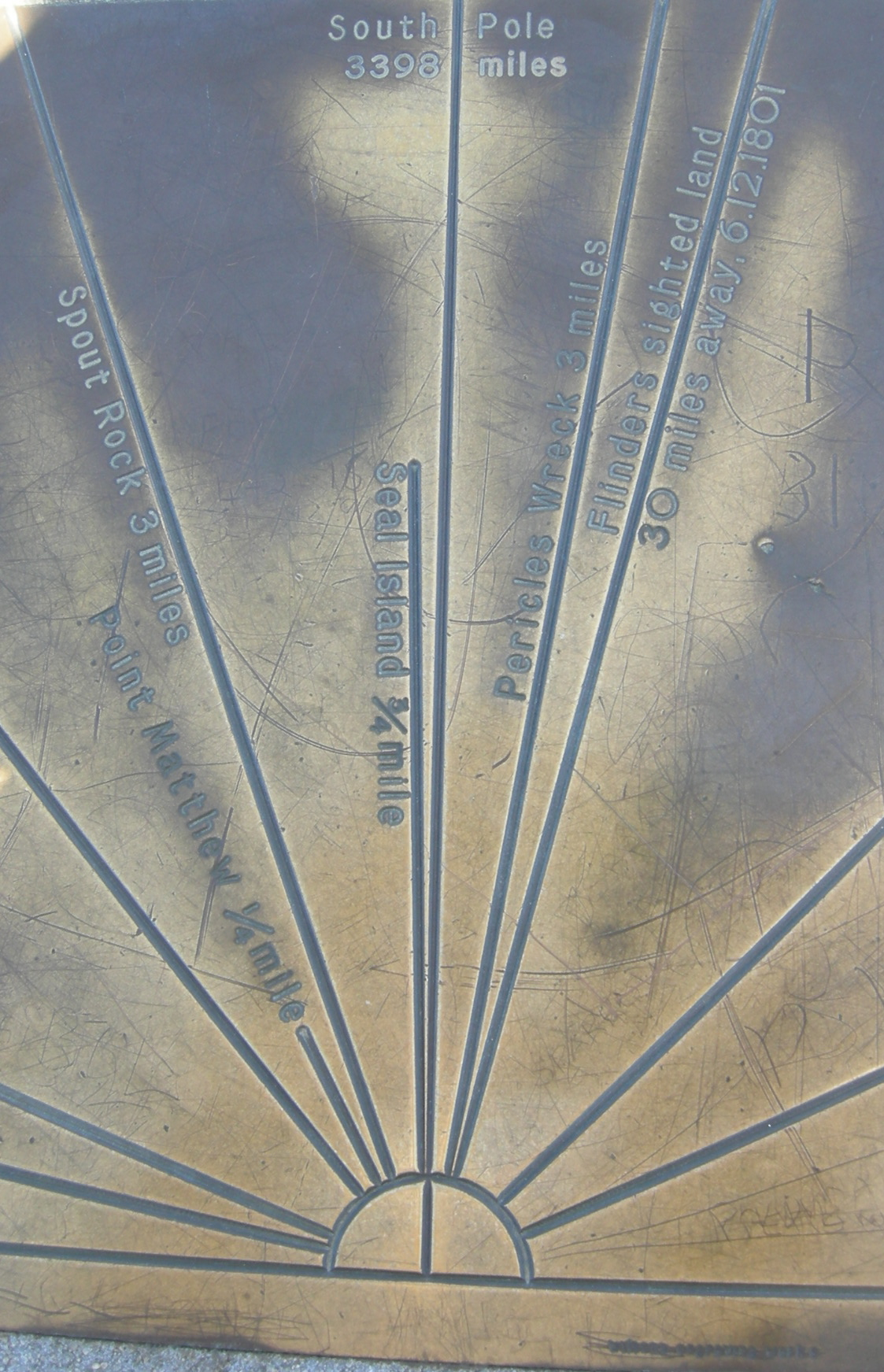
Point Matthew lookout plaque (part only) showing distance to the South Pole

== Wrecks ==
There are a number of wrecks in the vicinity of Cape Leeuwin.

The best-known wreck near the islands was that of the Aberdeen White Star ship SS Pericles on an uncharted rock on 13 March 1910, within sight of the Cape Leeuwin Lighthouse in daylight hours.

Whale watching Boats leaving from Augusta Port tend not to venture into this group of islands and rocks, but travel around Flinders Bay to the east of the islands.

The islands are significant for their bird colonies – with Seal Island and St Alouarn Island being reserves for that purpose.

The named islands, in order of distance from mainland are:

== Named islands and rocks ==
=== Seal Island ===
- Seal Island (Augusta, Western Australia) – is a large flat brownish rock, 1.5 km south of Point Matthew.

possibly named by George Vancouver in 1791, recorded by Archdeacon in 1878
Status: Seal Island Nature Reserve – National Parks and Nature Conservation Authority
Size: approx 4 ha in area – Conservation of Fauna reserve

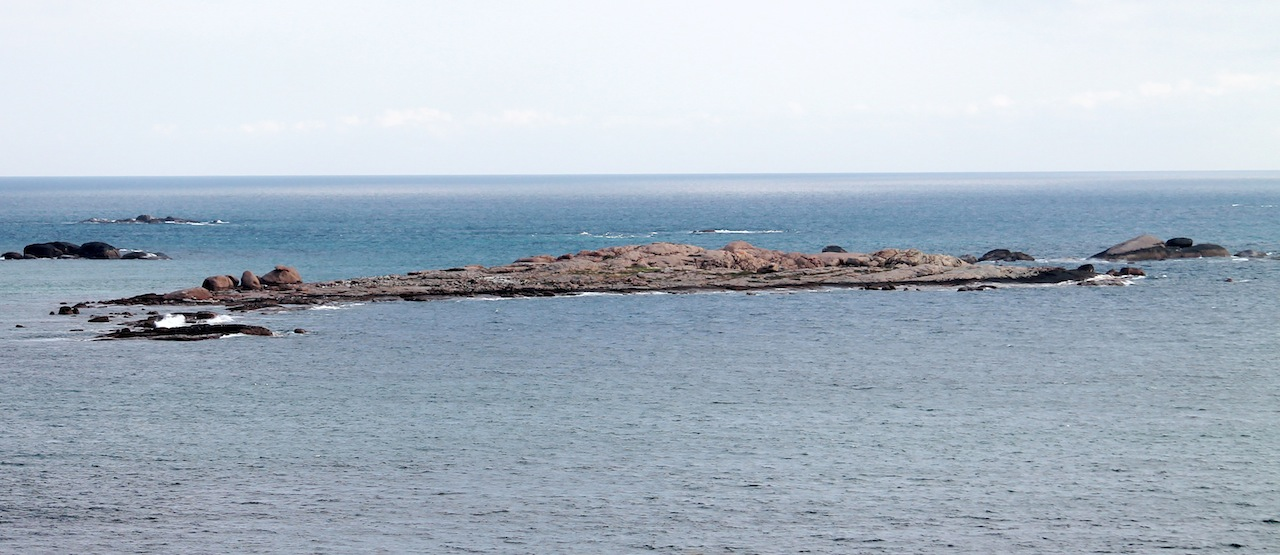
Seal Island

=== Saint Alouarn Island ===
- Saint Alouarn Island 34°24′15″S 115°11′30″E

- 5.5 km south east of Point Matthew

Created as an A class reserve – May 1960
Named a Wildlife Sanctuary – December 1972
Named a Nature Reserve – May 1979

Saint Alouarn Island Nature Reserve –
Size: approx 8.5 ha in area – Conservation of Fauna reserve

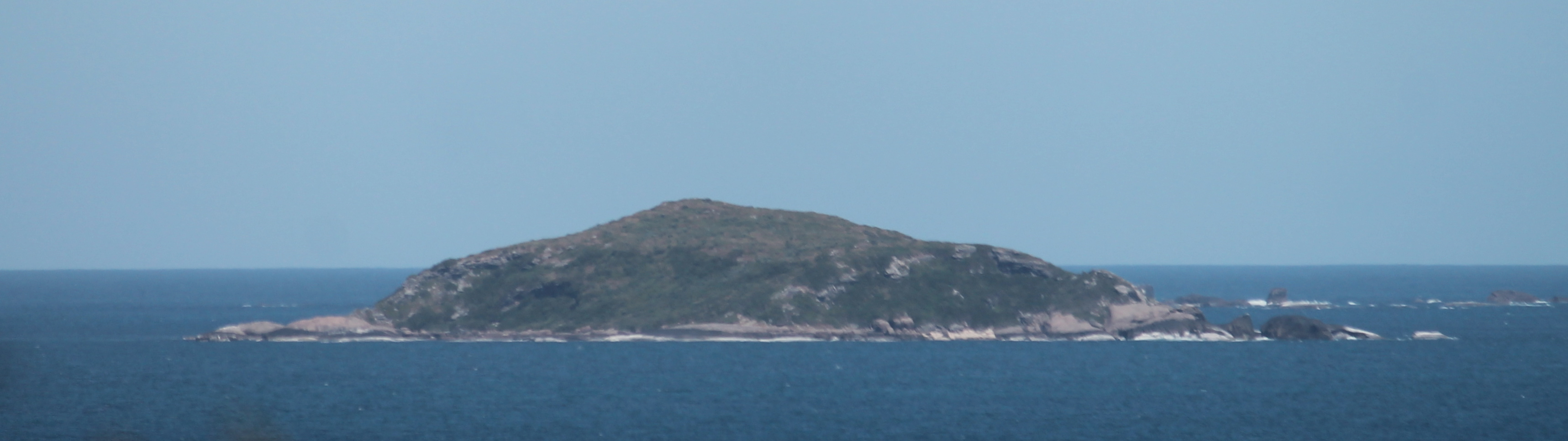
Saint Alouarn Island

=== Flinders Island ===
- Flinders Islet (also Flinders Island) – 34°21′00″S 115°20′00″E

(also identified by some sources as Flinders Island

Named Island in Admiralty Chart 1037 of 1878
Vested as 'Flinders Island and various rocks south of Augusta' as 'A' reserve in 1986.

Named as part of a sanctuary zone in the Ngari Capes Marine Park

- 7 km south east of Point Matthew

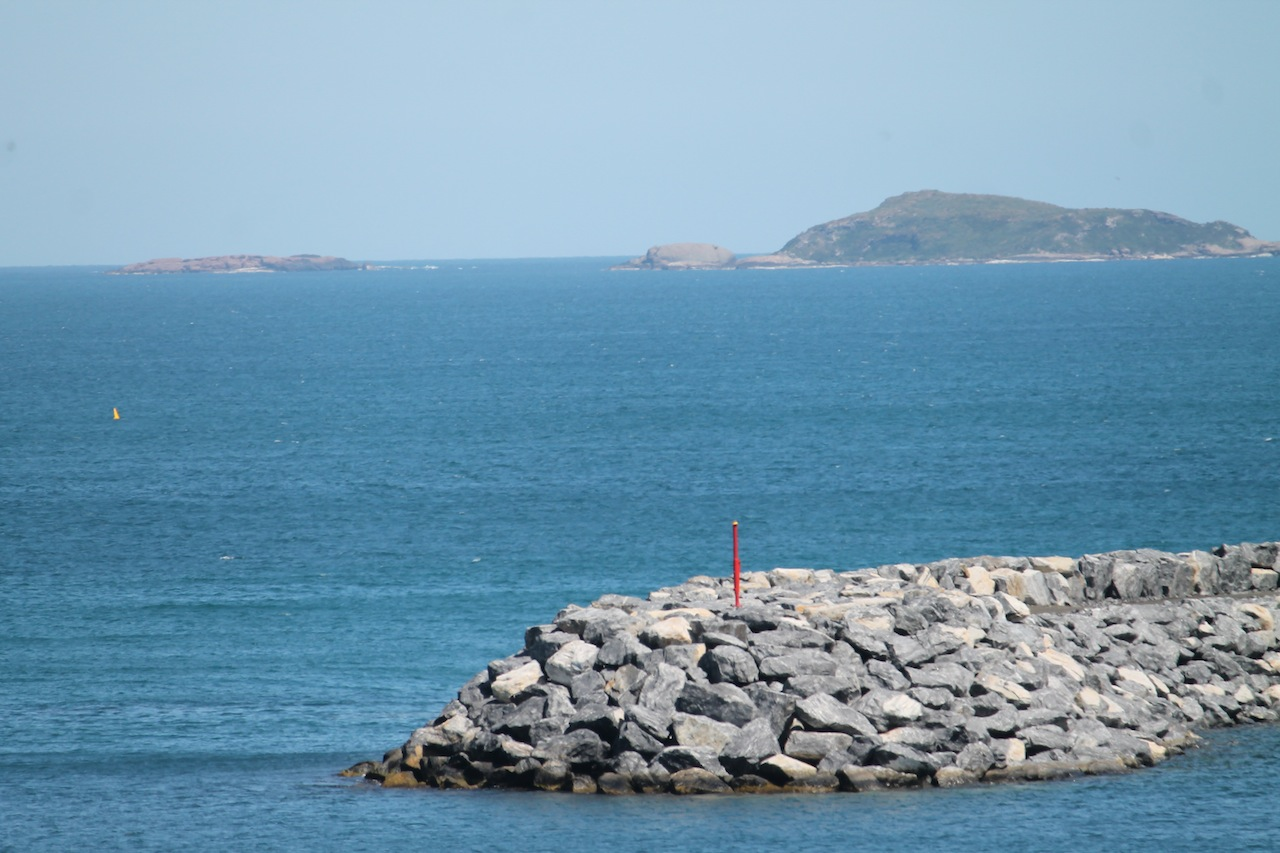
Flinders is on left side at rear

=== Rocks ===
There are a few named rocks in the group

- Square Rock – 7.5 km south east of Point Matthew
- South-West Breaker – approximately 9 km south-southwest of Point Matthew is the farthest named rock from the mainland.

Unnamed rocks run parallel to the line of named islands above, between Cape Leeuwin and South-West Breaker, with one exception – Spout Rock, west of Flinders Islet.

== Augusta Port ==
In 2009, the gazettal of the Augusta Port Area delineated the port in reference to the northernmost point (at High water level) on Saint Alouarn Island (with truncated spelling), as well as Seal Island, and Point Matthew.

In 2013 – 2013, the Western Australian government, through the Royalties for Regions programme, constructed a new harbour outside of the Hardy Inlet area of the Blackwood River mouth.

The port is to the south, and within view of Flinders Bay settlement and boat ramp. It is located adjacent to the road that goes to Cape Leeuwin lighthouse.

Oceangoing vessels had previously anchored in Flinders Bay, or used the Flinders Bay jetty; however, its short-term operation between the 1890s and 1930s subsequently left the bay with no port facility.

== See also ==
- List of islands of Western Australia
