= Canal Rocks =

Granite rocks near Yallingup, Western Australia

Coordinates: 33°40′08″S 114°59′40″E

Canal Rocks is a series of granite rocks in the Indian Ocean, just off the coast situated approximately 4 kilometres (2 mi) south of Yallingup in the South West region of Western Australia. The Noongar name for this place is Winjee Sam.

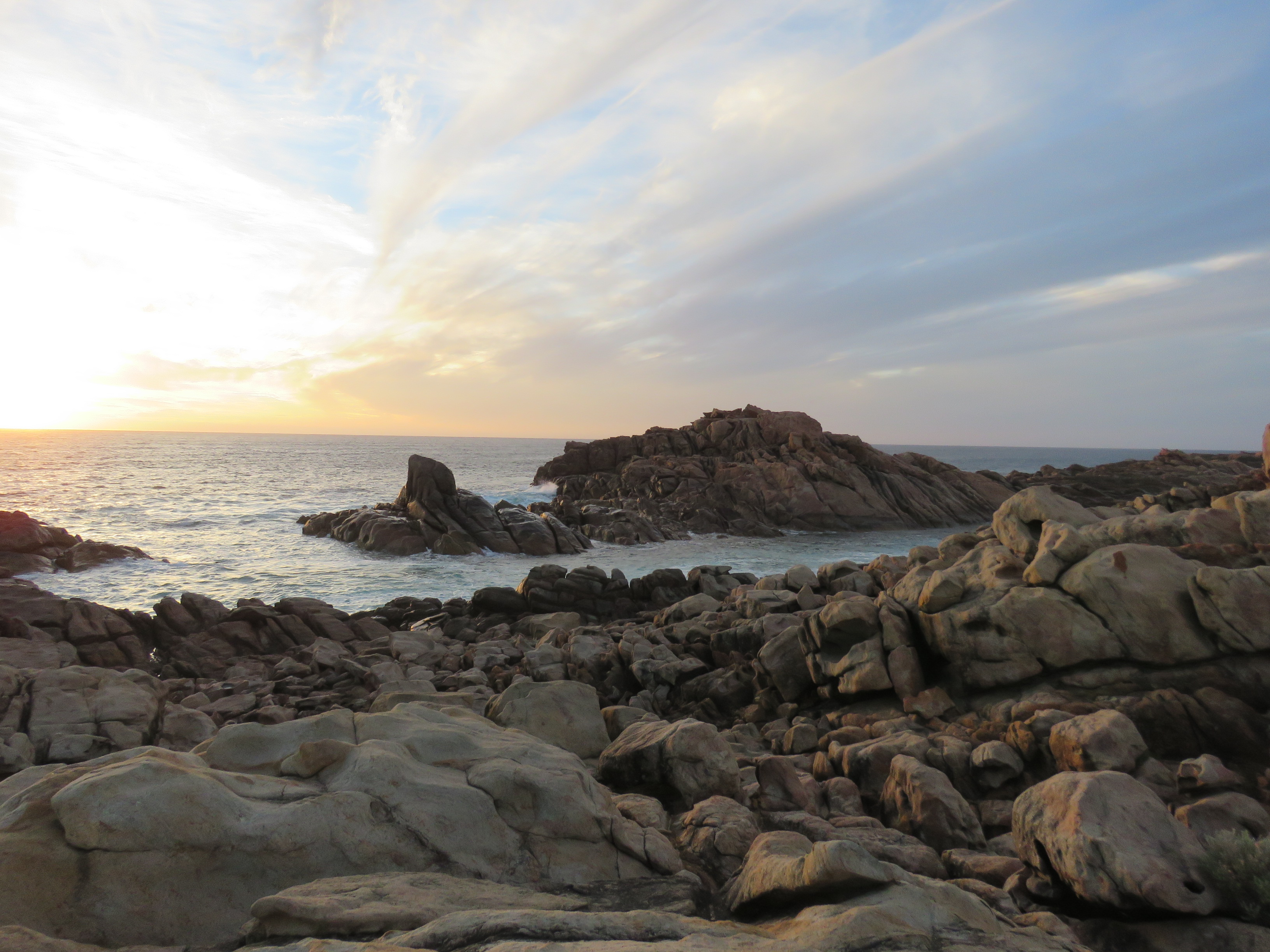
Canal Rocks in February 2021

The rock formation takes its name from the narrow channel between the rocks that has formed from the coastal waters eroding the granite-gneiss away over time. The rocks that make up the canals are part of the Leeuwin-Naturaliste Ridge, or Leeuwin complex. The rocks that make up the feature consist of hornblende-biotite monzogranite gneiss that are medium to coarse-grained and moderately foliated containing minerals such as perthite, quartz, hornblende with accessory biotite, opaques, apatite, and zircon. The original rock that underwent medium metamorphism was granite. The estimated age of crystallisation is 702 ± 7 million years.

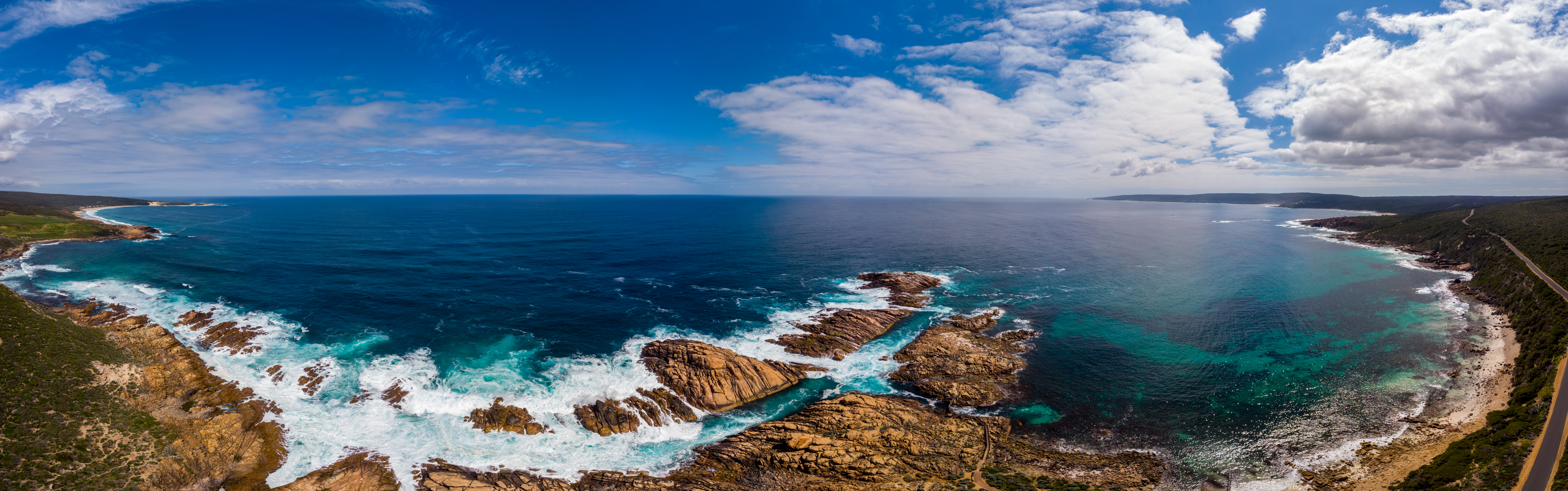
Canal Rocks aerial panorama

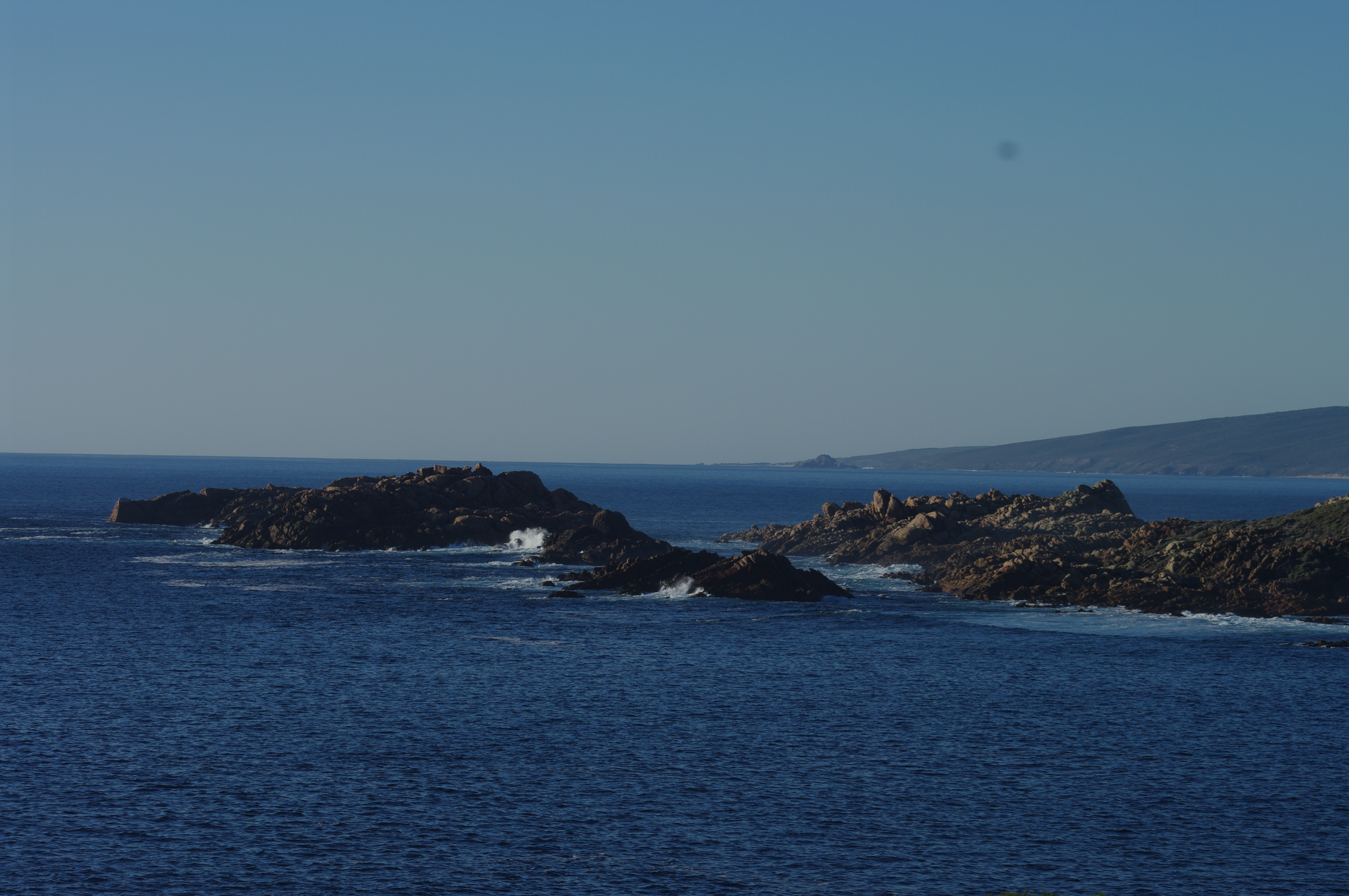
Canal Rocks

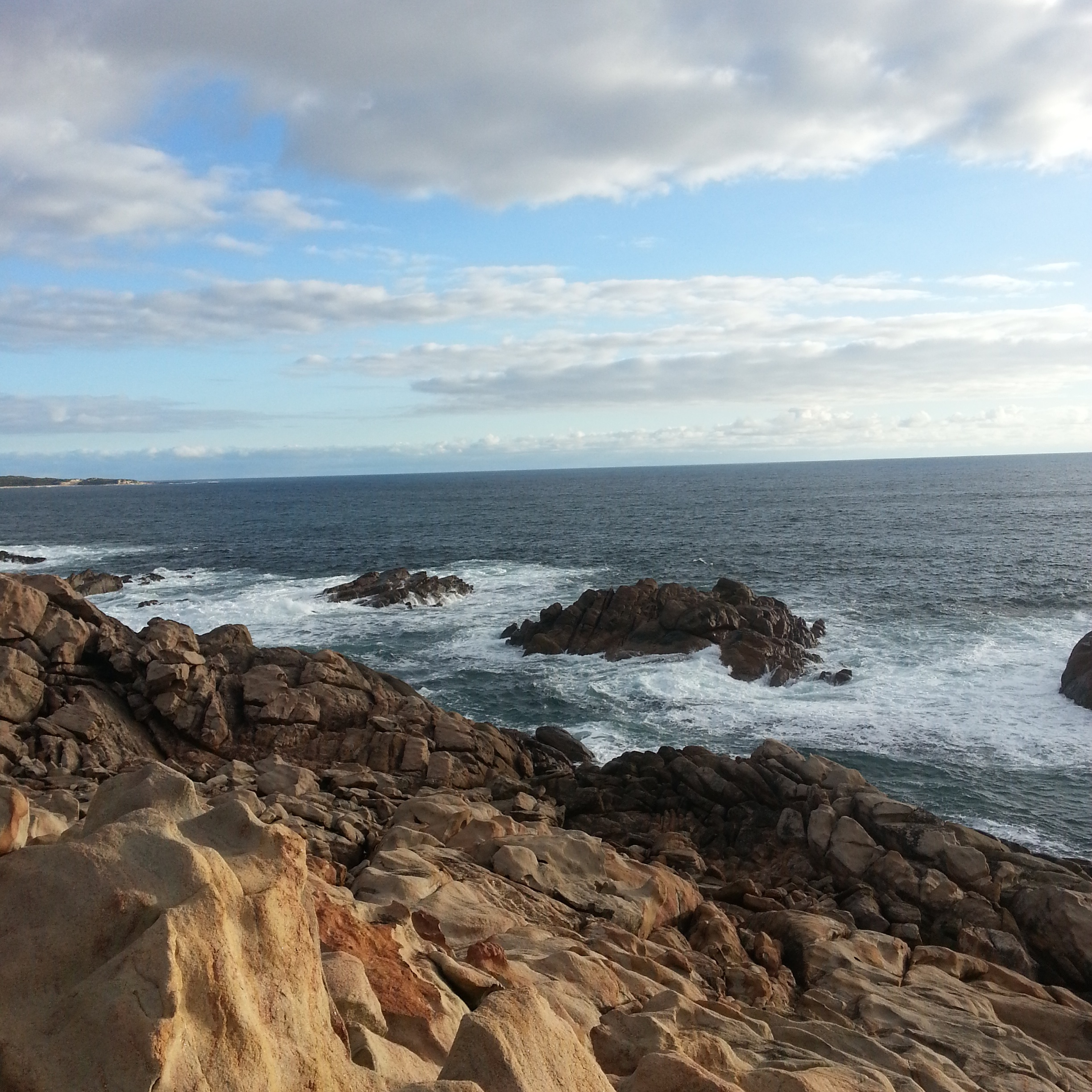
Indian Ocean from Canal Rocks

Canal Rocks panorama

The Cape to Cape Track passes near the lookout over the rocks. Facilities at the site include a car park, boat ramp, finger jetty and a walkway to access the closest rock formation. A small, unpatrolled 200-metre-long (656 ft) beach is found to the lee-side of the rocks with low to subtidal sand and patchy rock reefs. The road through to the site, which was already a popular fishing and recreational area, was constructed in 1907 from Caves Road.

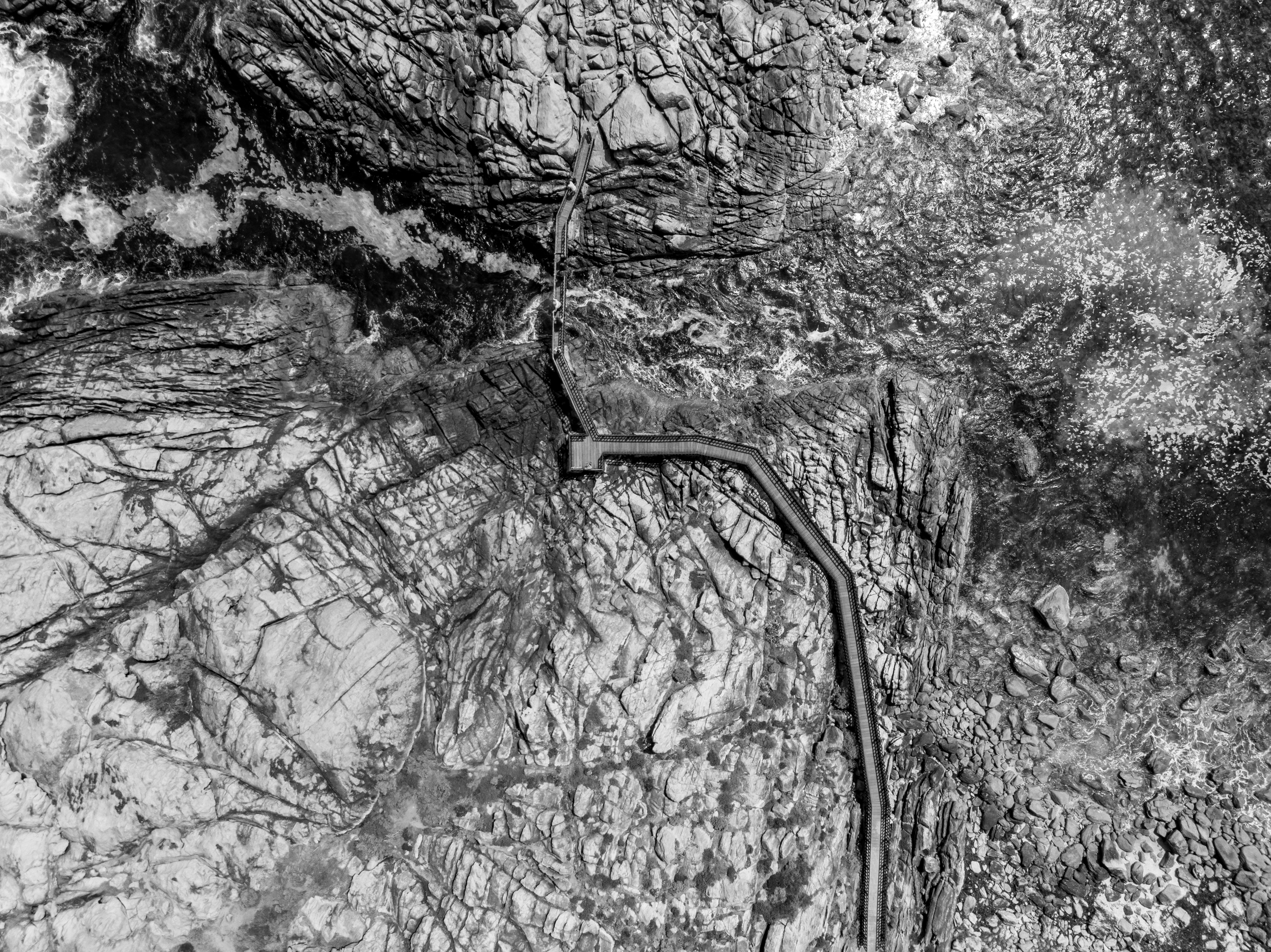
Canal Rocks walkway from above

A man went missing when diving alone off the rocks in 2010, and a fisherman drowned when fishing off the rocks in 2014; his body was never recovered but he is thought to have been washed from the rocks by a freak wave.
