= Cape to Cape Track =

Long-distance walk trail in Western Australia

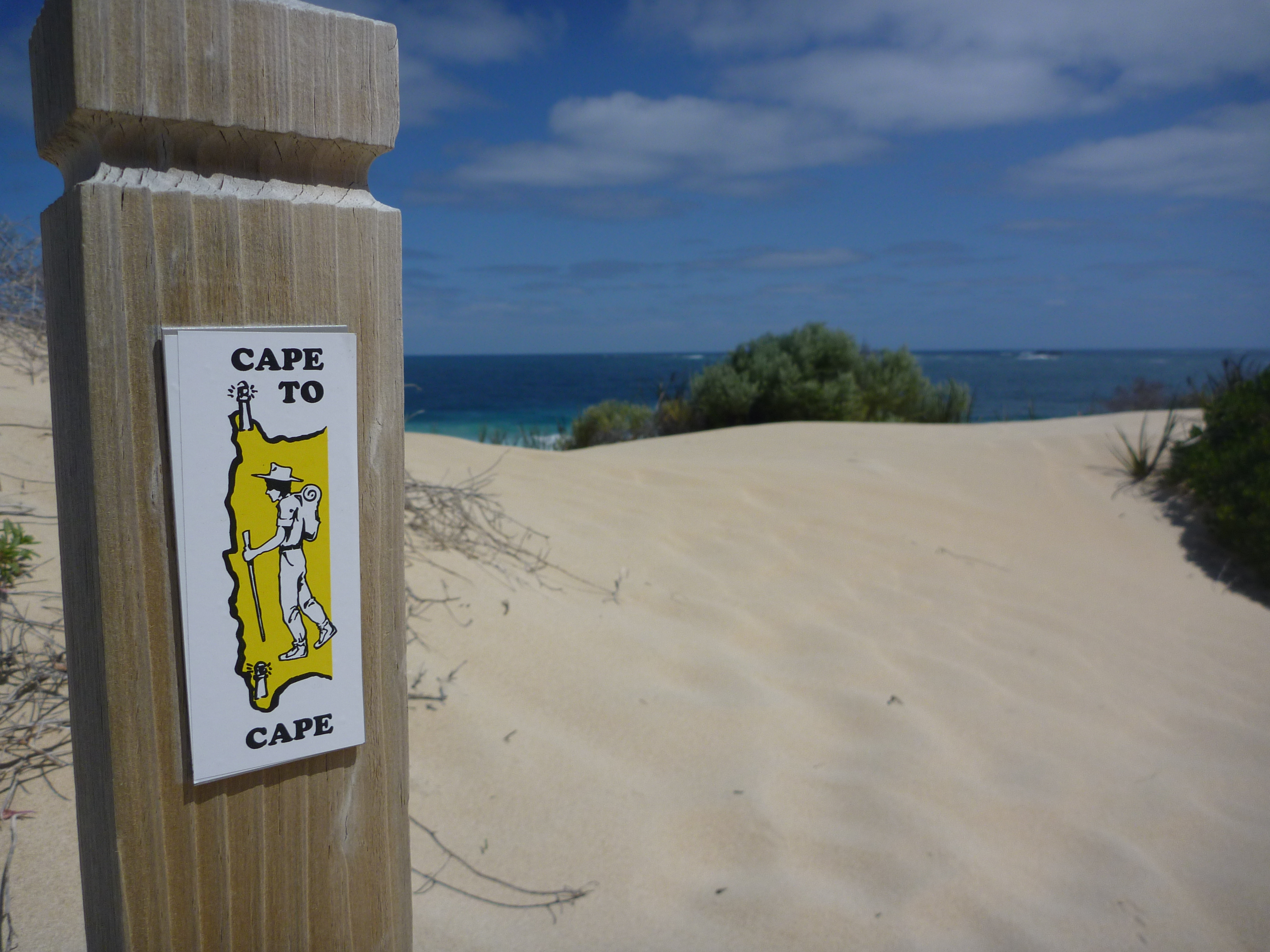
- Track marker near Deepdene Beach
- Length: 123 km (76 mi)
- Location: Southwestern Western Australia, Australia
- Established: pre-European
- Began construction: 1988
- Completed: April 2001
- Designation: Long-Distance Walk Trail
- Trailheads: Cape Naturaliste (northern terminus), Cape Leeuwin (southern terminus)
- Use: Hiking
- Season: All year
- Waymark: Cape to Cape Track marker
- Hazards: Summer heat, Fire danger
- Right of way: Pedestrian
- Maintained by: Parks and Wildlife Service at the Department of Biodiversity, Conservation and Attractions, Friends of the Cape to Cape Track
- Website: parks.dpaw.wa.gov.au/know/cape-cape-track

Trail map
- The Cape to Cape Track is a walk trail between the lighthouses at the tips of Cape Naturaliste and Cape Leeuwin in Western Australia.

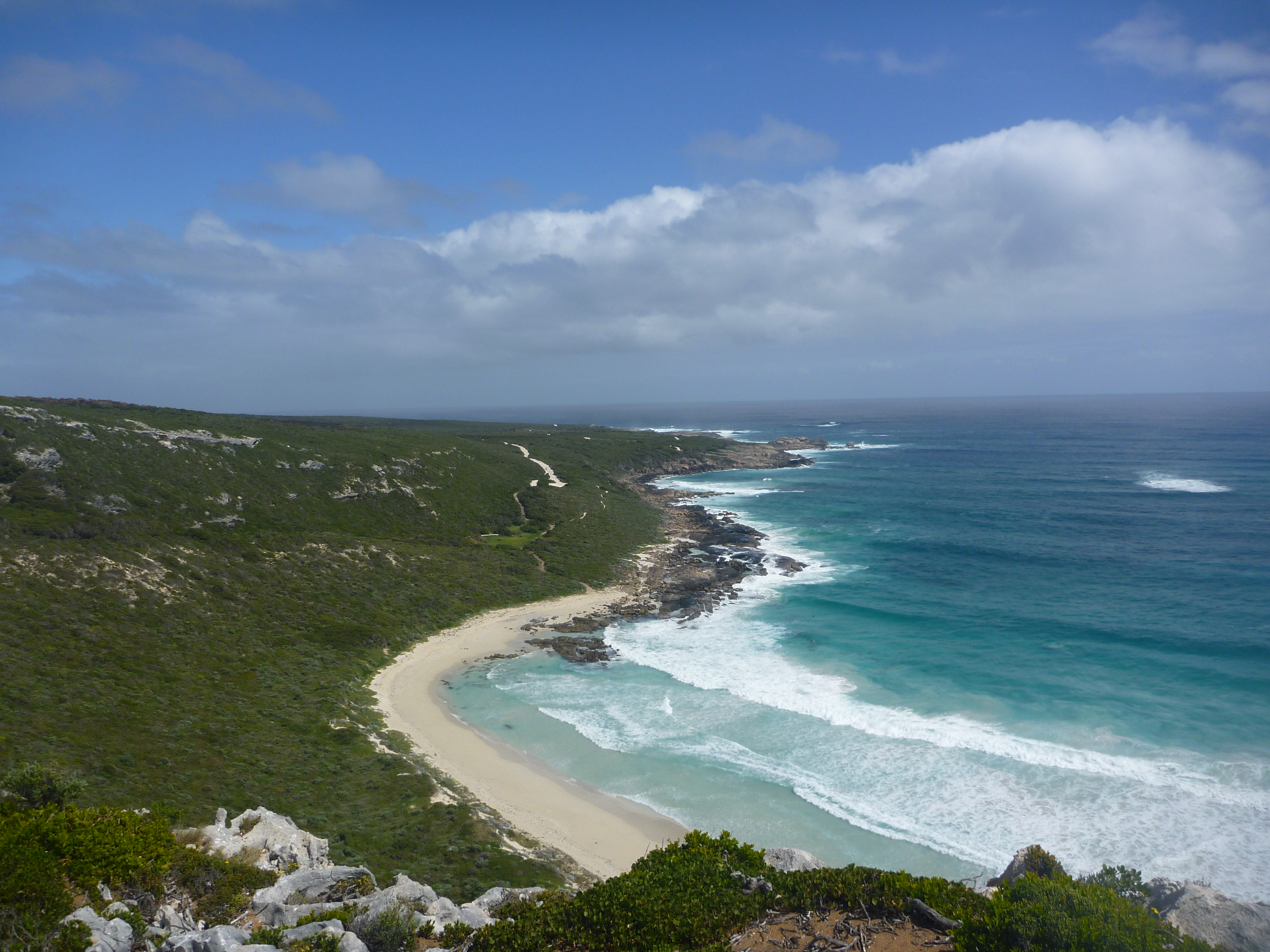
Cape Freycinet and Contos Beach from the Cape to Cape Track

The Cape to Cape Walk Track is a long-distance walk trail located in the far south-west corner of Western Australia, 250 kilometres (160 mi) south of Perth. It meanders along the whole length of the Leeuwin-Naturaliste Ridge, which forms the backbone of the Leeuwin-Naturaliste National Park. Its start and finish are the lighthouses at the tips of Cape Naturaliste and Cape Leeuwin. The Track extends over 123 kilometres (76 mi) of coastal scenery, sheltered forests and pristine beaches, and is in close proximity to the caves, vineyards and other features and attractions of the South West Capes – Margaret River region.

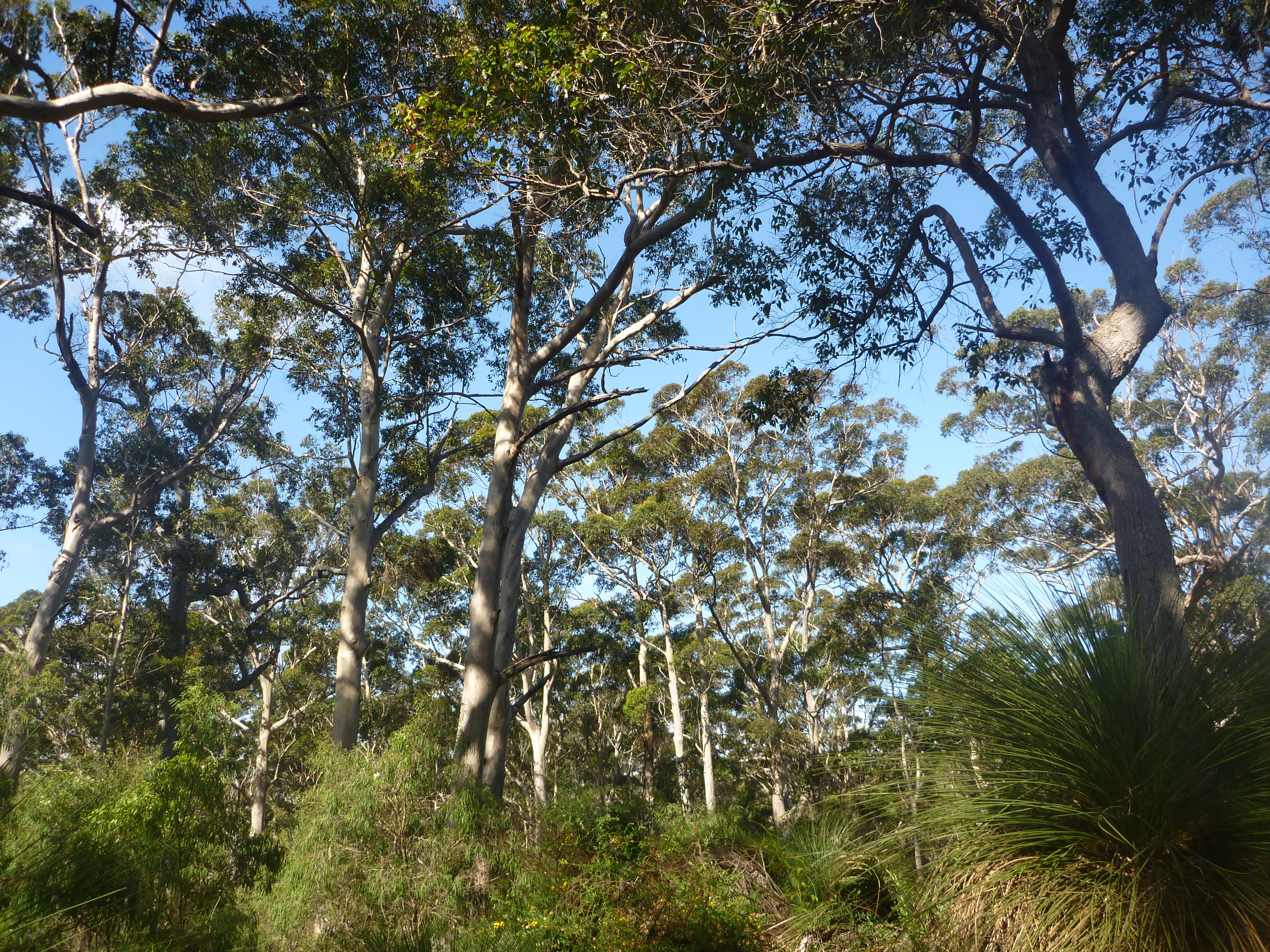
Boranup Forest from the track

== History ==
The original Aboriginal inhabitants of the area are the Wardandi people, who were encountered at various points on or near the track by Nicolas Baudin, the first European recorded to have visited the area, in 1801. Soon after the first European settlers arrived at Augusta in March 1831, John Dewar, Andrew Smith, William Longmate, Thomas Robinson and Henry Postans travelled to the Swan River on foot, recording the section to Cape Naturaliste in their journal. They seemed to have had little difficulty traversing the country, reporting that much had been burnt, and they travelled alternately on the beaches or three to four miles inland along a ridge of low hills. It took them six days to reach Cape Naturaliste, much the same time that it takes now, though probably in slightly less relaxed fashion, as they started before sunrise, and sometimes marched by moonlight.

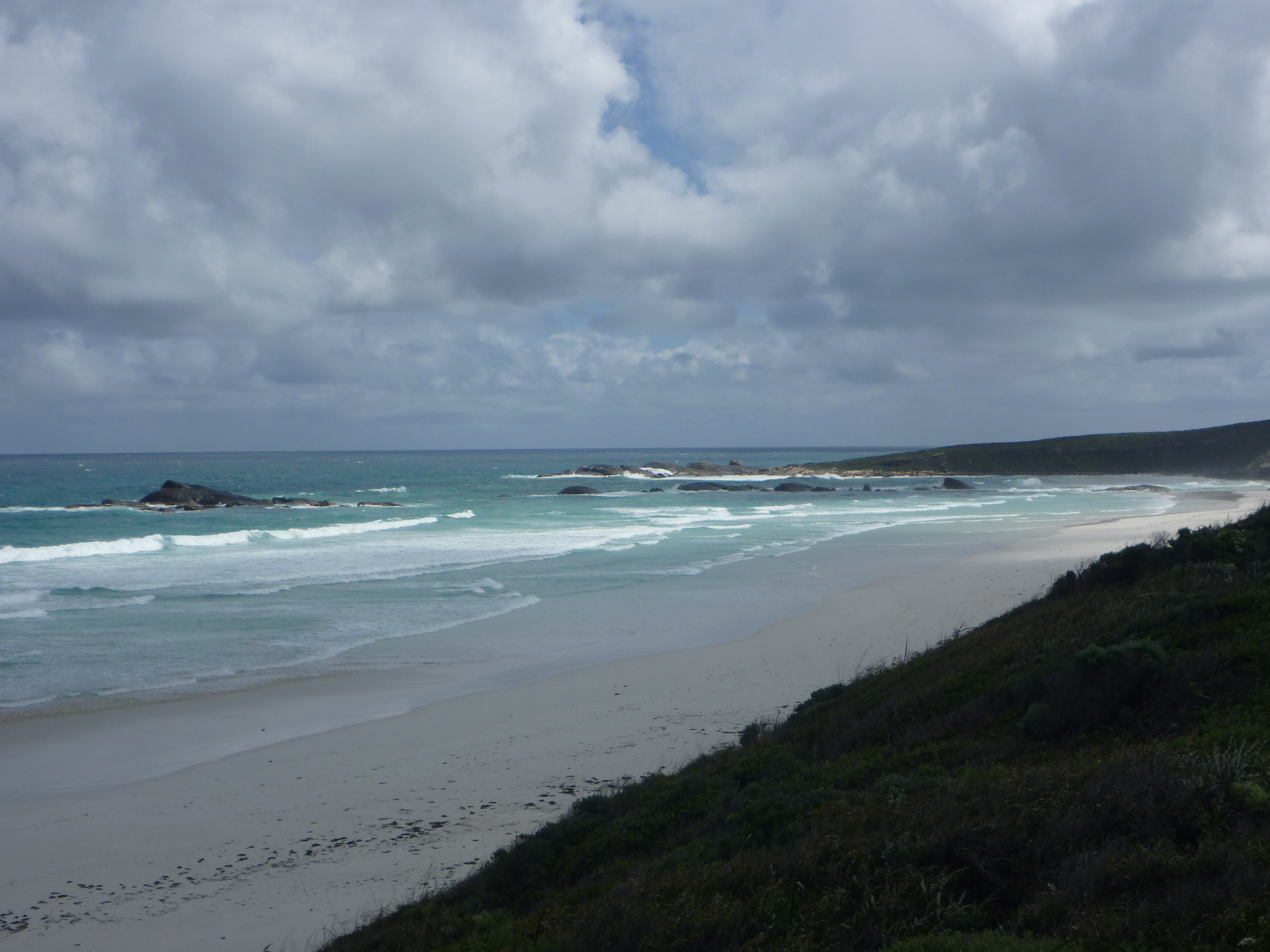
Boranup Beach North End

Since those days, the Leeuwin-Naturaliste Ridge has become increasingly populated, with roads and tracks criss-crossing the land. Most of these, however, run east–west, whereas the coastline runs north–south, and much of the remaining bush land between has grown thick and impenetrable. The coastline and a significant proportion of the ridge are now reserved as the Leeuwin-Naturaliste National Park. In the 1980s Jane Scott, a local resident, found ways of walking from the one Cape to the other.

In 1988, an Australian government Bicentenary Grant provided funding to the Department of Biodiversity, Conservation and Attractions (DoBCA), then known as the Department of Environment and Conservation (DEC), for a project to develop the dedicated walk-track.

The Track was officially opened in April 2001 and is managed by DoBCA with assistance provided by the Friends of the Cape to Cape Track.

== The Track today ==
The Track is a combination of different types of terrain and surfaces. It varies from smooth, wide tracks, to narrow rocky paths, to soft sandy beaches and a few rough scrambles. The intention is to create a low-key bush trail that blends into the environment, rather than a highly engineered walkway. However, the track between Cape Nauraliste and Sugarloaf is specially constructed for disabled users. This section is suitable for wheelchair use, but the rest of the track is designed as a single-use walking track, and cannot sustain the wear and tear of other users such as horses or mountain bikes.

Some sections currently make use of old vehicle tracks, and other sections involve cutting new paths. The Track includes several quite long stretches of accessible beach, allowing opportunities for cooling the feet, as well as helping to minimise construction and maintenance costs. To help control erosion, and to make life easier for walkers, there are built steps on some steep sections.

Many streams form sandbars in summer but flow through to the sea in winter. The only stream with a formal bridge crossing is Boodjidup Brook.

Access points along its length allow walkers to sample the Track as a series of short walks over time. Many people complete the walk over several months or years as a series of one-day or half-day walks. The goal for some walkers will be to complete the whole Track at once, but for many, enjoying a short walk now and again is feasible.

The track passes by several historic locations and sites including Cape Leeuwin water wheel.

== Track marking ==
Square pine posts mark the way at most intersections, and at intervals between, each post bearing the triangular Track logo. Larger wooden signs usually show the way off beaches.

== Climate ==
The climate along the Capes is not extreme, having a Mediterranean climate with warm, dry summers and cool, wet winters. The area rarely experiences frosts, and snow has never been recorded. Summer temperatures only occasionally approach 40 °C (104 °F). This southwest corner, starting with Cape Leeuwin, is the first part of the Australian mainland to feel the force of the Roaring Forties or winter gales that whip across the southern Indian Ocean. The minimum temperature is always above 0 °C (32 °F).

== Camping ==
There are several campsites and caravan parks for walkers wishing to camp out along the Track. They provide places to camp roughly a day's walk apart along the length of the Track. Four low-key campsites have a bush toilet, a rainwater-tank filled from the toilet roof, a picnic-table, and seats. These no-fee campsites provide no shelter and users need to carry their own tents. There are two other more-developed National Park campgrounds along the Track where camping fees are payable, that have toilets and fireplaces. Other, more elaborate, campgrounds with accommodation along the Track are commercial operations. It is illegal to camp at non-dedicated camping zones as it is situated in a national park.

The Track passes through four settlements, Yallingup, Gracetown, Prevelly, and Hamelin Bay.

== Water ==
The quality of water is highly variable, with creeks generally flowing from vineyards and farmland. All drinking water, except that from town taps should be treated. Don't rely on streams because they dry up in summer.

In summer, walkers should carry a minimum of 3 litres (3.2 US qt) of water for a day's walking, and more if camping.

== See also ==
- Caves Road Tourist Drive, the road route between the capes
