= HMAS Leeuwin =

One ship and one shore base of the Royal Australian Navy have been named HMAS Leeuwin, after Cape Leeuwin in Western Australia.

- HMAS Leeuwin (naval base), a naval base in Fremantle, Western Australia from 1940 to 1986, then operated by the Australian Army as Leeuwin Barracks
- HMAS Leeuwin (A 245), lead ship of the Leeuwin-class hydrographic survey vessels, which entered service in 2000 and is active as of 2016

== See also ==
- HMAS Cape Leeuwin, a lighthouse tender commissioned into the RAN during World War II
