= Leeuwin-Naturaliste National Park =

National park in Western Australia

- IUCN category II (national park)
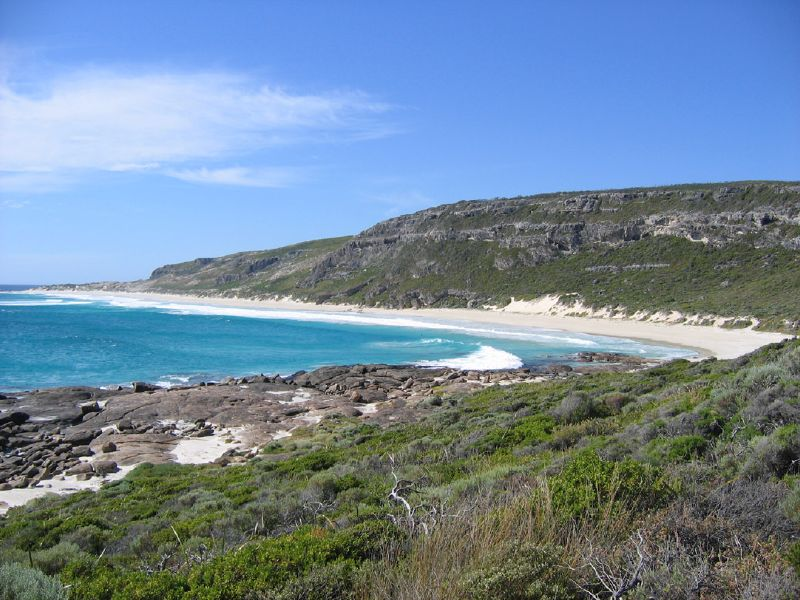
- A location in the Leeuwin-Naturaliste National Park

- Location within Western Australia
- Location: Western Australia
- Nearest city: Busselton
- Coordinates: 34°14′19″S 115°02′50″E
- Area: 190.92 km^{2} (73.71 sq mi)
- Established: 1957
- Governing body: Parks and Wildlife Service of the Department of Biodiversity, Conservation and Attractions
- Website: Official website

Leeuwin-Naturaliste National Park is a national park in the South West region of Western Australia, 267 km (166 mi) south of Perth. It is named after the two capes either end of the park, Cape Leeuwin and Cape Naturaliste. It is located in the Augusta Margaret River and Busselton council areas, and is claimed to have the highest visiting numbers of any national park in Western Australia. The park received 2.33 million visitors through 2008–2009.

== Description ==
The park extends over 160 kilometres (100 mi), from Cape Naturaliste in the north to Cape Leeuwin in the south. It is composed of 28 separate reserves, which together have an area of about 15,600 hectares (39,000 acres). Despite the park's large size, the reserves are fragmented, and in many places the park consists only of a narrow coastal strip.

It has many features of interest including limestone and granite outcrops like Sugarloaf Rock and Canal Rocks. The coastal area also contains many beaches with well-known surf breaks, such as Supertubes, Yallingup Beach, and Smiths Beach. Other coastal features include coastal cliffs and aeolian dunes. The park contains many caves, some of which are accessible by the public. There are brackish and freshwater lakes and springs, and the park is crossed by several creeks and rivers, including the Margaret River.

The park either passes through or contains historic sites including the Cape Leeuwin water wheel.

== Leeuwin–Naturaliste Ridge ==
The Leeuwin-Naturaliste Ridge is a discontinuous strip of coastal dune limestone running north–south and extending along the western shore, parallel to the coast from Cape Naturaliste to Cape Leeuwin. The ridge is composed of two landform elements, Tamala Limestone and the basement rock the limestone formed on, called the Leeuwin Complex.

Tamala Limestone is a naturally occurring eolianite limestone, found in deposits on the western coastline of Western Australia.

The Leeuwin Complex is a strongly metamorphosed igneous Proterozoic rock made up mostly of granitic and anorthositic gneisses. The Dunsborough Fault forms the eastern boundary of the Leeuwin Complex where it adjoins the sedimentary Perth Basin.

The ridge's geology and the variations in vegetation are confined to a number of very narrow bands that follow the north–south orientation of the ridge.

== Caves ==
The Leeuwin-Naturaliste Ridge contains over 150 caves, formed via the erosion of Tamala Limestone. Within the national park, six caves are accessible to the public.

=== Ngilgi Cave ===
Ngilgi Cave, previously known as Yallingup Cave is a cave to the northeast of Yallingup, available for semi-guided tours.

=== Calgardup Cave ===
Calgardup Cave is a cave available for self-guided tours.

=== Mammoth Cave ===
Mammoth Cave is a cave available for self-guided audio tours.

=== Lake Cave ===
Lake Cave is a cave available for guided tours.

=== Giants Cave ===
Calgardup Cave is a cave available for self-guided tours.

=== Jewel Cave ===
Jewel Cave is a cave available for guided tours.

== Flora and fauna ==
The park contains a large range of geologic features and soil types. The landscape and soil diversity supports a range of plant communities. These include coastal herblands and grasslands, sedgelands, and heath near the coast. Further inland are shrublands, woodlands, and forests, including peppermint tree (Agonis flexuosa) and Banksia shrubland and woodland, and significant stands of tall karri (Eucalyptus diversicolor) and jarrah (Eucalyptus marginata) forest.

A large variety of bird species inhabit the park including many sea birds, red-eared firetail, white-breasted robin, rock parrot and emu. Native mammals that can be found within the park include southern brown bandicoots, western grey kangaroos, western ringtail possums and brush wallabies.

== Conservation ==
The national park was created from crown lands along the Leeuwin-Naturaliste Ridge at a time after the main primary industries in the region had been dairying and forestry, and when increased land-use conflict was arising from the spread of wineries, increased population on hobby farms and other agricultural activities.

Since then many competing land uses have created a complex land management scenario for state and local government authorities trying to mediate quite conflicting issues. The national park is located on some of the most vulnerable land in the region.

== 2021 Bushfire ==
On 8 December 2021, a bush fire began near Mammoth Cave within Leeuwin-Naturaliste National Park, said to have been deliberately lit. WA premier Mark McGowan urged people to leave the area as soon as possible due to high fuel loads and dangerous conditions. The fire burned through more than 3,200 ha (7,900 acres) by the following day.

== Cape to Cape Track ==
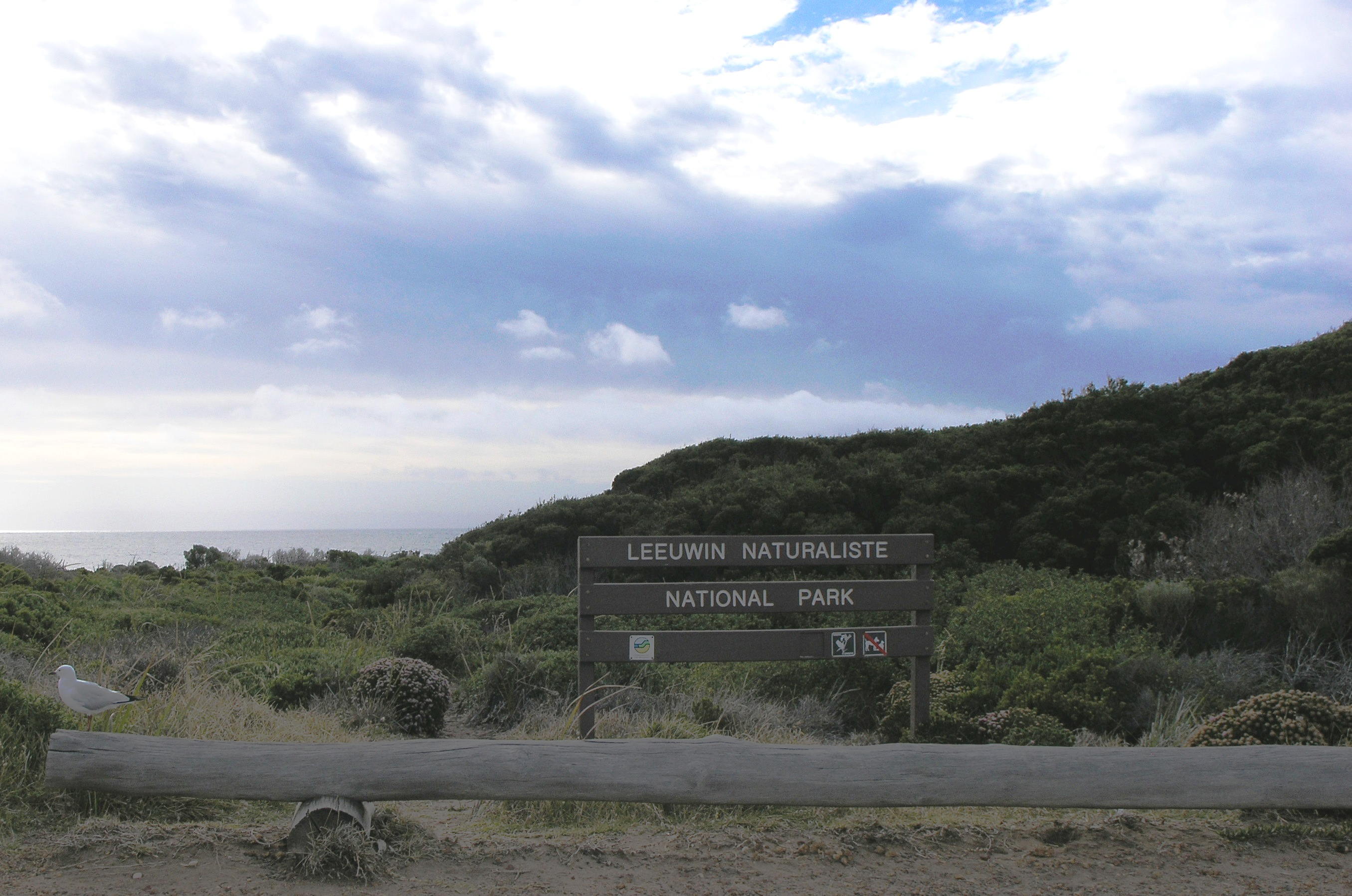
The start of Leeuwin-Naturaliste National Park, at Cape Leeuwin

In 2001, the Department of Environment and Conservation (DEC) opened the Cape to Cape Track, a 135 kilometre walking track along the Leeuwin-Naturaliste ridge.

Panorama from Canal rocks looking towards Yallingup

== See also ==
- List of caves in Western Australia
- Protected areas of Western Australia
