= Flinders Bay =

Bay and former port in south west Western Australia

Coordinates: 34°21′S 115°20′E

Flinders Bay is a bay in western Australia, immediately south of the townsite of Augusta, and close to the mouth of the Blackwood River.

The bay lies to the north east of Cape Leeuwin which is the most south-westerly mainland point of the Australian Continent, in the state of Western Australia.

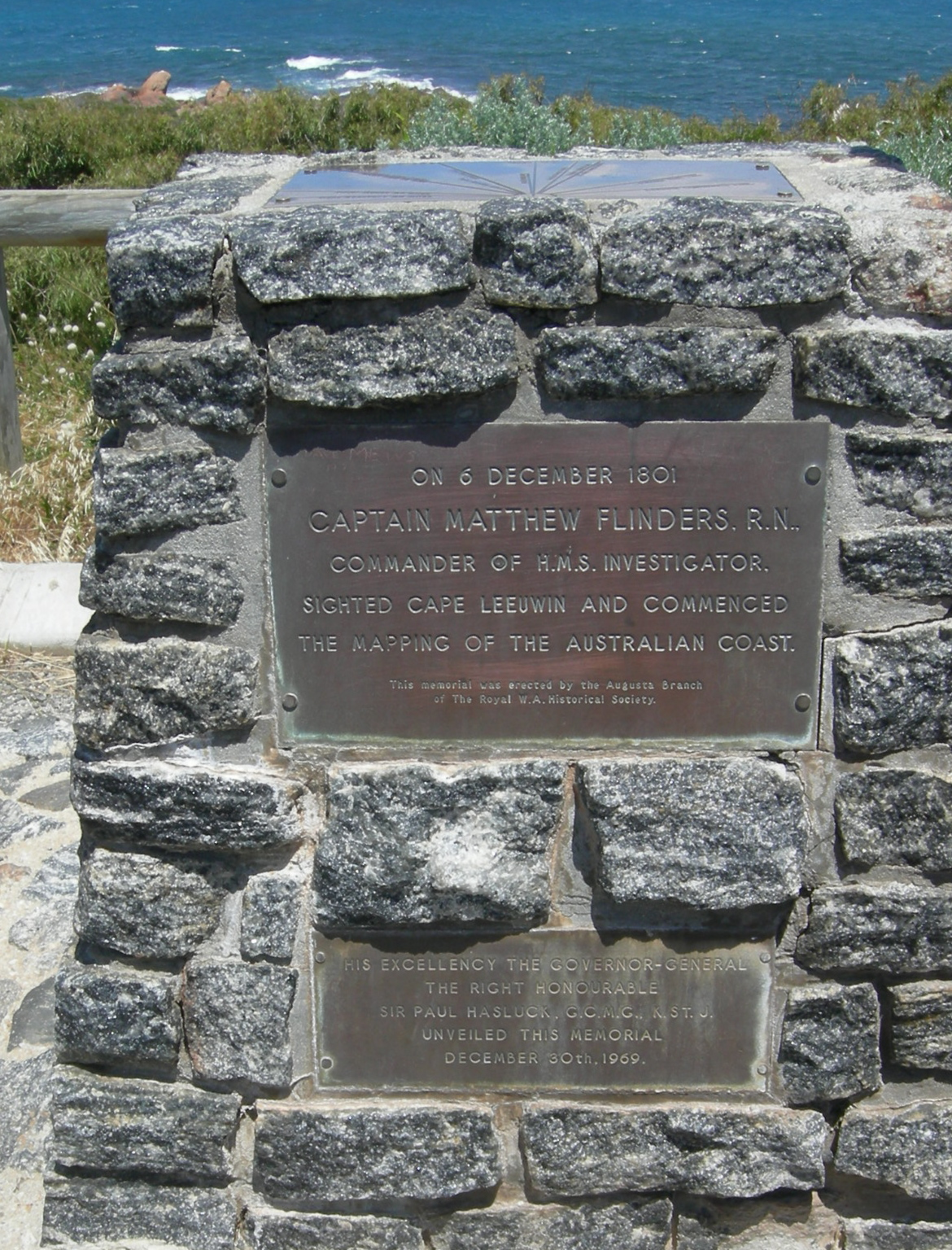
Plaque at Point Matthew lookout on road to Cape Leeuwin

== Bay ==
On Matthew Flinders Terra Australis Sheet 1 1801–1803 the area was originally known as Dangerous Bight. The bay runs from Point Matthew 1.5 kilometres (0.9 mi) East North East of Cape Leeuwin to Ledge Point some 8 kilometres (5 mi) east. It was named by either James Stirling or Septimus Roe in 1829 or 1830. Matthew Flinders was first in the Bay on 7 December 1801.

== Railway terminus and jetty ==
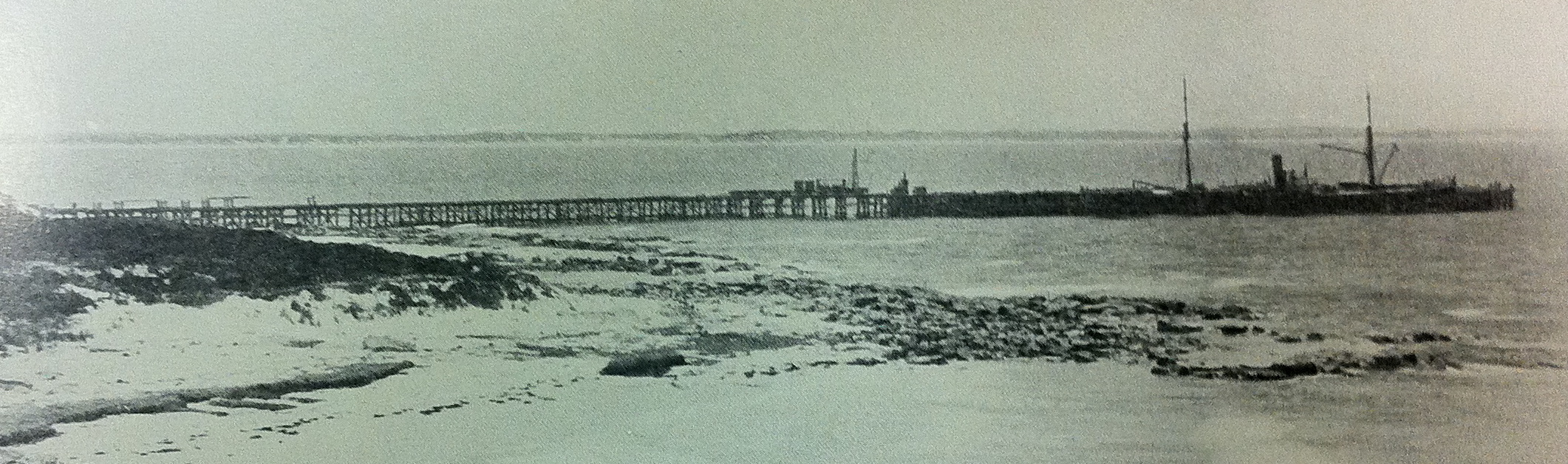
View of Flinders Bay jetty 1899/1902

The name of the Flinders Bay area is tied to the small settlement that had been a whaling and fishing location, as well as the terminus of the Busselton to Flinders Bay branch railway railway line (1920s, closed 1957).

The name is also tied to the Flinders Bay jetties (also known as the Barrack Point Jetties). The terminology for the jetties and port varied in the nineteenth century, including designation of Port Augusta, Flinders Bay.

== Locality ==
The settlement was in the earlier days considered to be separate from Augusta but now is more or less the southern portion of the larger Augusta community. The locality had a Post Office, general store and railway terminus station.

== Boat harbour ==
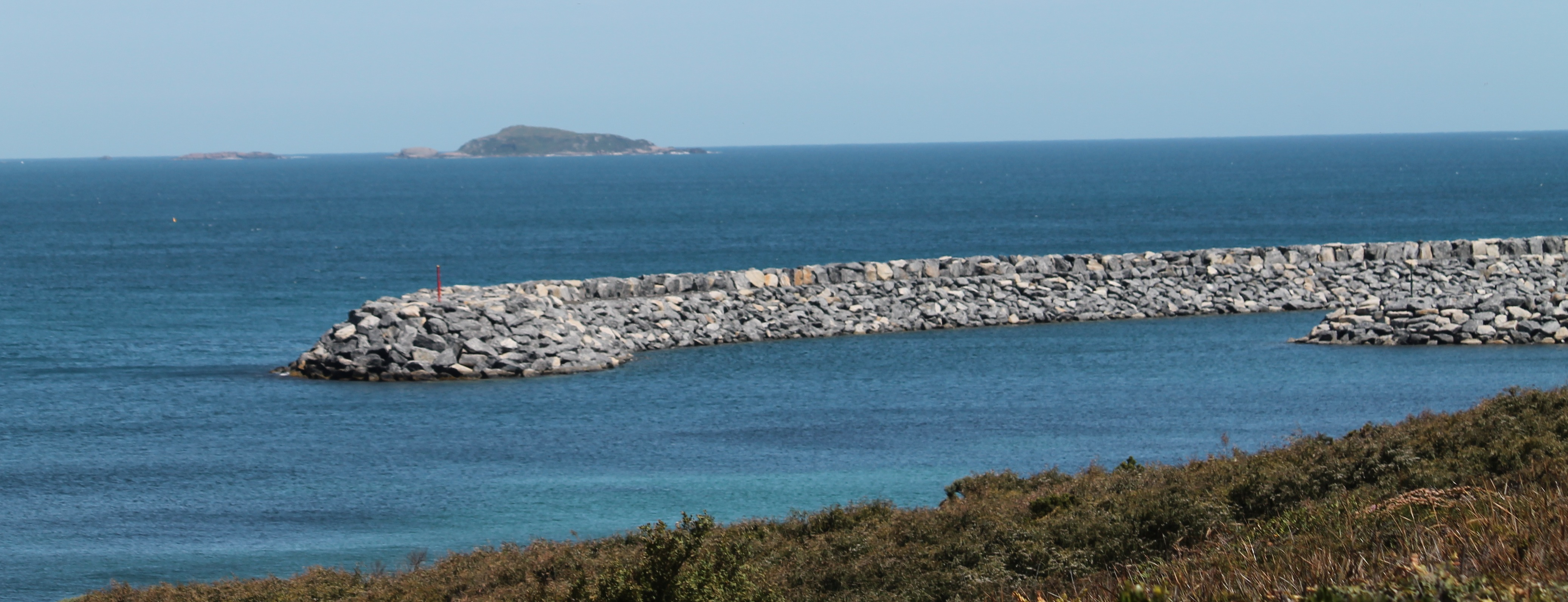
Augusta Boat Harbour entrance in 2013

The need for safe and efficient transfer of whale watchers and a safe mooring location in the Bay for fishermen has seen a proposal for a marina in 2004 which had included plans for the marina close to the old settlement of Flinders Bay. The 2005 revised proposal was moved to a bay further around towards Cape Leeuwin. The Flat Rock site is complete and has been called "Augusta Boat Harbour" by the department of Transport.

== Whaling ==
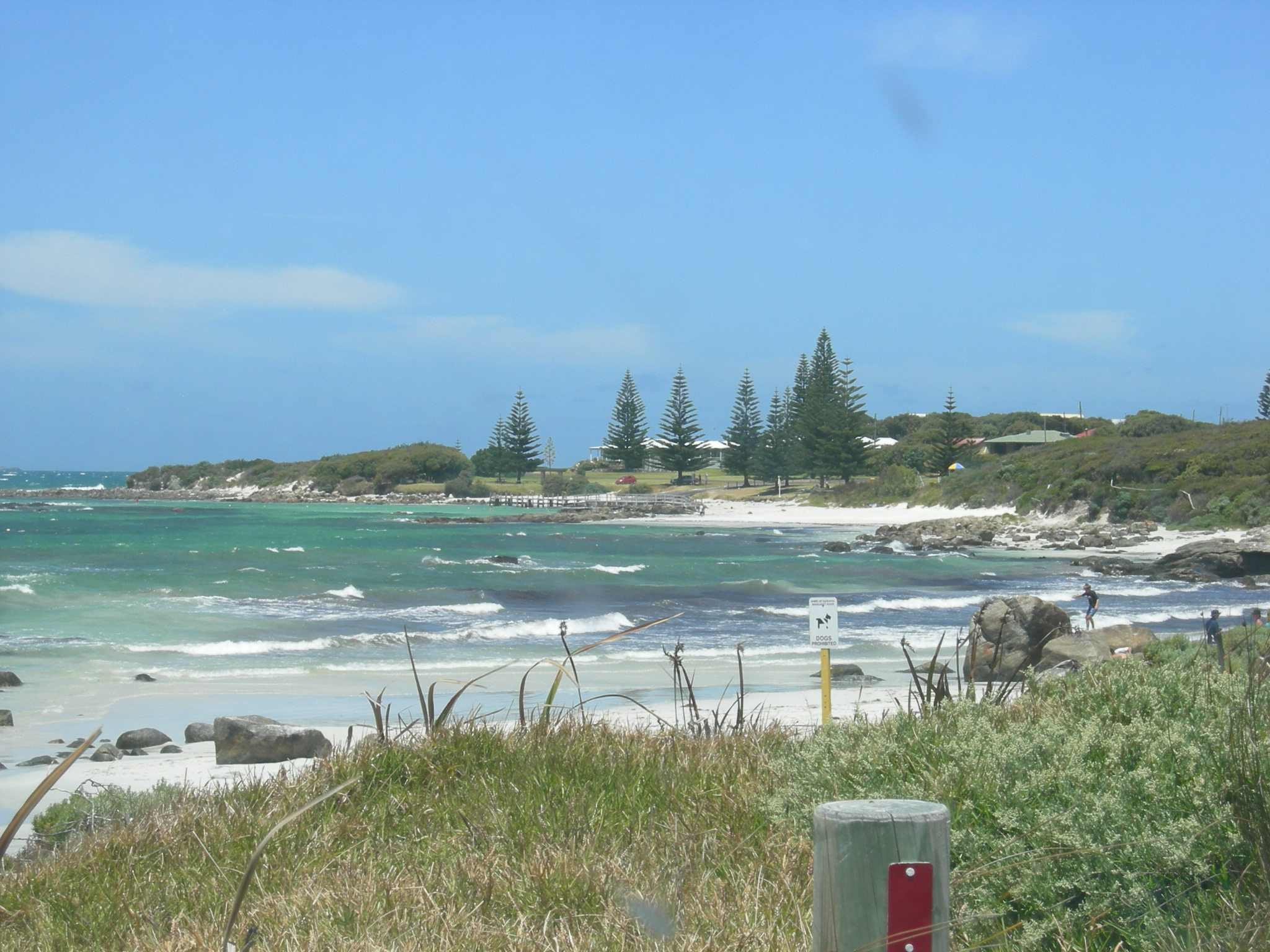
View of the Flinders Bay whaling and settlement from the north

The landing area adjacent to the old railway station yard was originally known as "The Whaling". It was the area where boats would work from in the nineteenth and early twentieth century. Up until the early 1970s sheds and ramps were still present. In the late 20th century the area had whale rescue operations occurring very close to the area. Also businesses involved in whale watching have more recently used the bay.

== Islands ==
The St Alouarn Islands stretch out south of Point Matthew (on the road to Cape Leeuwin), and are effective barriers along with reefs for the outer reaches of the bay to the south.

== Climate ==
Like the majority of the southwestern coastal regions of Western Australia, Flinders Bay experiences a cool-summer Mediterranean climate with cool to warm summers and mild, wet winters.

== Abalone sea ranch ==
After trials in 2012, a world-first commercial "sea ranch" was set up in 2016, to raise abalone. The ranch is based on an artificial reef made up of 5000 (as of April 2016) separate concrete units called abitats (abalone habitats). The 900-kilogram (2,000 lb) abitats can host 400 abalone each. The reef is seeded with young abalone from an onshore hatchery.

The abalone feed on seaweed that has grown naturally on the habitats. The ecosystem enrichment of the bay also results in growing numbers of dhufish, pink snapper, wrasse, samson fish and other species. The company emphasises the similarity to wild abalone and the difference from shore based aquaculture. "We're not aquaculture, we're ranching, because once they're in the water they look after themselves."

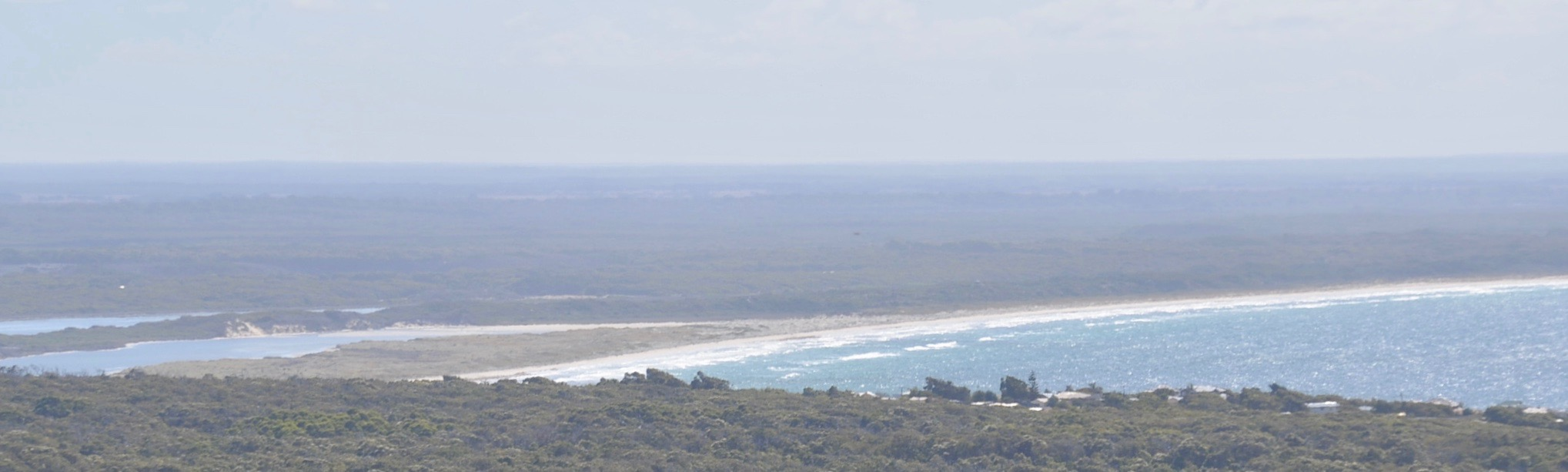
View of the head of the bay from the ridge to the west, Blackwood River to the left
