= Cape Leeuwin water wheel =

Heritage listed non operative water wheel in Western Australia

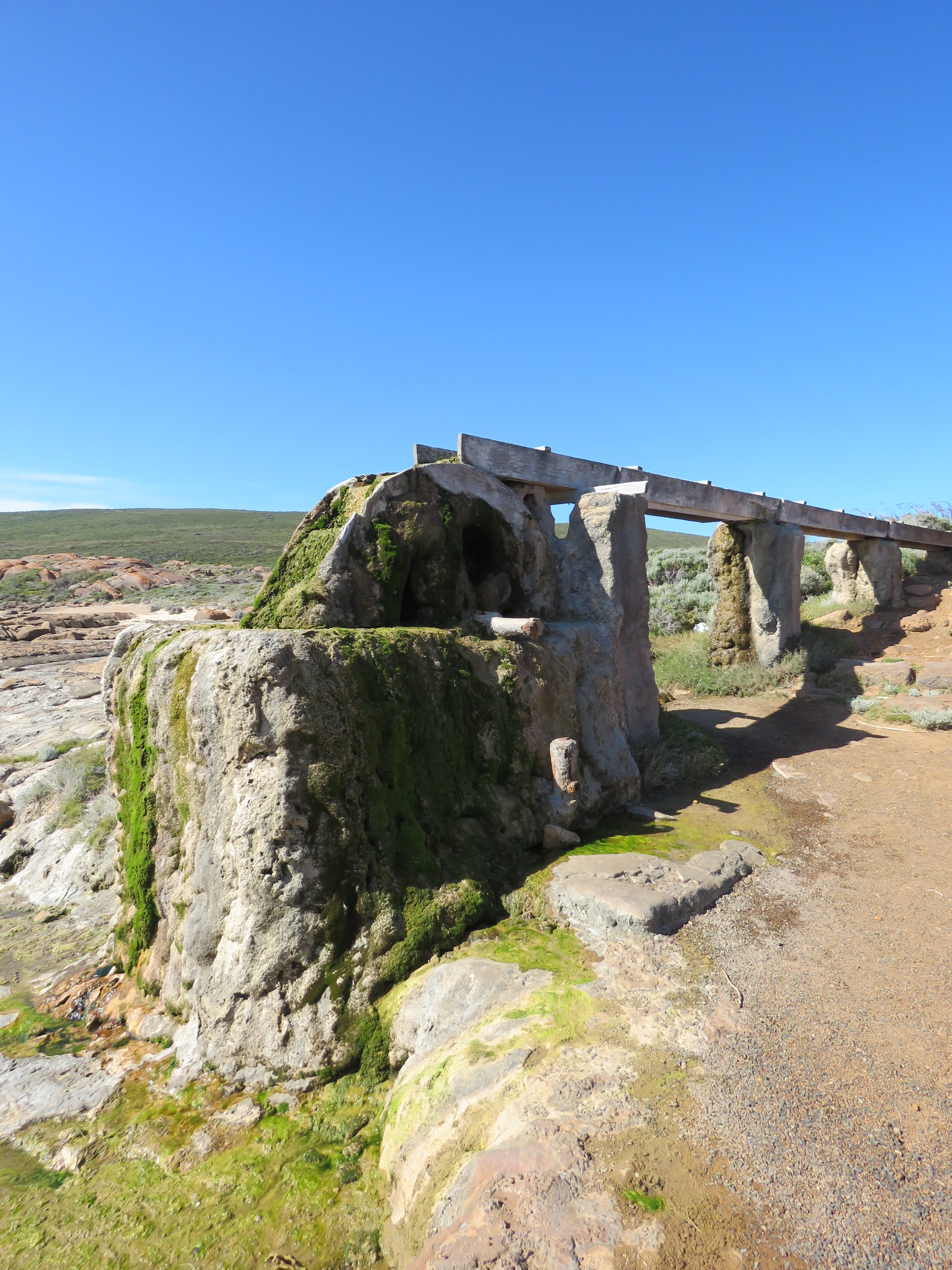
- The water wheel in 2021

- Location in Western Australia
- Interactive map of Cape Leeuwin water wheel
- 34°22′7.7″S 115°08′7.4″E
- Location: Cape Leeuwin, Shire of Augusta-Margaret River, Western Australia

Western Australia Heritage Register
- Official name: Cape Leeuwin Waterwheel
- Type: State Registered Place
- Designated: 14 May 2002
- Reference no.: 106

Cape Leeuwin water wheel, sometimes called the petrified water wheel, is a non-operating water wheel, near Cape Leeuwin, in the south-west of Western Australia. It was used to pump fresh water to the Cape Leeuwin Lighthouse. It is notable both for its coastal location and because it has become heavily calcified. The water wheel is located above a small cove, approximately 400 metres (1,300 ft) to the north of the Cape Leeuwin Lighthouse cottages. The base of the water wheel structure is just above the high-tide sea level.

The remnant structure was added to the Western Australia Heritage Register on 14 May 2002.

== History ==
The water wheel was constructed in 1895 by the contractor building the Cape Leeuwin lighthouse, the partnership of Maurice Davies and John Wishart. Water to power the wheel was taken from a freshwater spring in a wetland about 330 metres (1,080 ft) away. The overshot water wheel had a maximum speed of "over 30 revolutions per minute", and drove a pumping arrangement—known as a "Douglas force pump"—that included a hydraulic ram, which, in turn, pumped some of the water via a small pipeline to the site of the lighthouse. The design of the water wheel is unusual in that tail water is restrained by an overflowing reservoir, and part of the tail water is diverted to the pipeline. Originally, the piped water was used to make mortar during the construction of the lighthouse. It was later used as a domestic water supply for those living in the cottages at the lighthouse. The water was pumped into an elevated storage tank, 4.6 metres (15 ft) above ground level.

By the late 1920s, the water wheel had become a minor tourist attraction, with one visitor opining,

The great water wheel, which supplies the place with water, had been going for 30 years. It just goes on and no one cares or worries about it. It just pumps the water up to the homes, and that is all that is needed. And it just does it with no attention, no strikes or labor agitation. This is the next thing to perpetual motion, and has to be seen to be believed.

The water wheel and pump were still running in 1931, and apparently as late as 1935, but had been retired by 1937, having been replaced by a windmill. (Note: The windmill was lost in 1937 during a storm.) According to one report, the water wheel stopped being used around October 1936. In 1938, a new pumping system was installed. The lighthouse was connected to the Augusta town water supply in 1978. The water wheel was regularly photographed over time. The water wheel was incorporated into the lighthouse precinct in land management plans in the early 2000s.

The spring water that feeds the water wheel is calcium rich and over the years the wheel became heavily encrusted with deposited calcium compounds, which stopped it rotating but also preserved it. When the wheel stopped turning is uncertain, but it appears to have been functional to at least 1940. By 1956, the flume to the waterwheel was dilapidated and no longer delivering water to the wheel and it remained in that state until at least 1960; it was restored by the end of 1962. Over the years, the flow from the spring has decreased and the flow to the now-stationary wheel is provided by an electric pump. The calcified remains of the wheel are kept moist by the flow, to prevent cracking. The air chamber of the hydraulic ram remains in place, on the southern side of the structure.

The water wheel and its associated structures are on various heritage registers. The site is within the Leeuwin-Naturaliste National Park, and lies near the southern terminus of the Cape to Cape Track.
