= The Sing-Song of Old Man Kangaroo =

1900 short story by Rudyard Kipling

"The Sing-Song of Old Man Kangaroo" is a short story — one of the Just So stories by Rudyard Kipling.

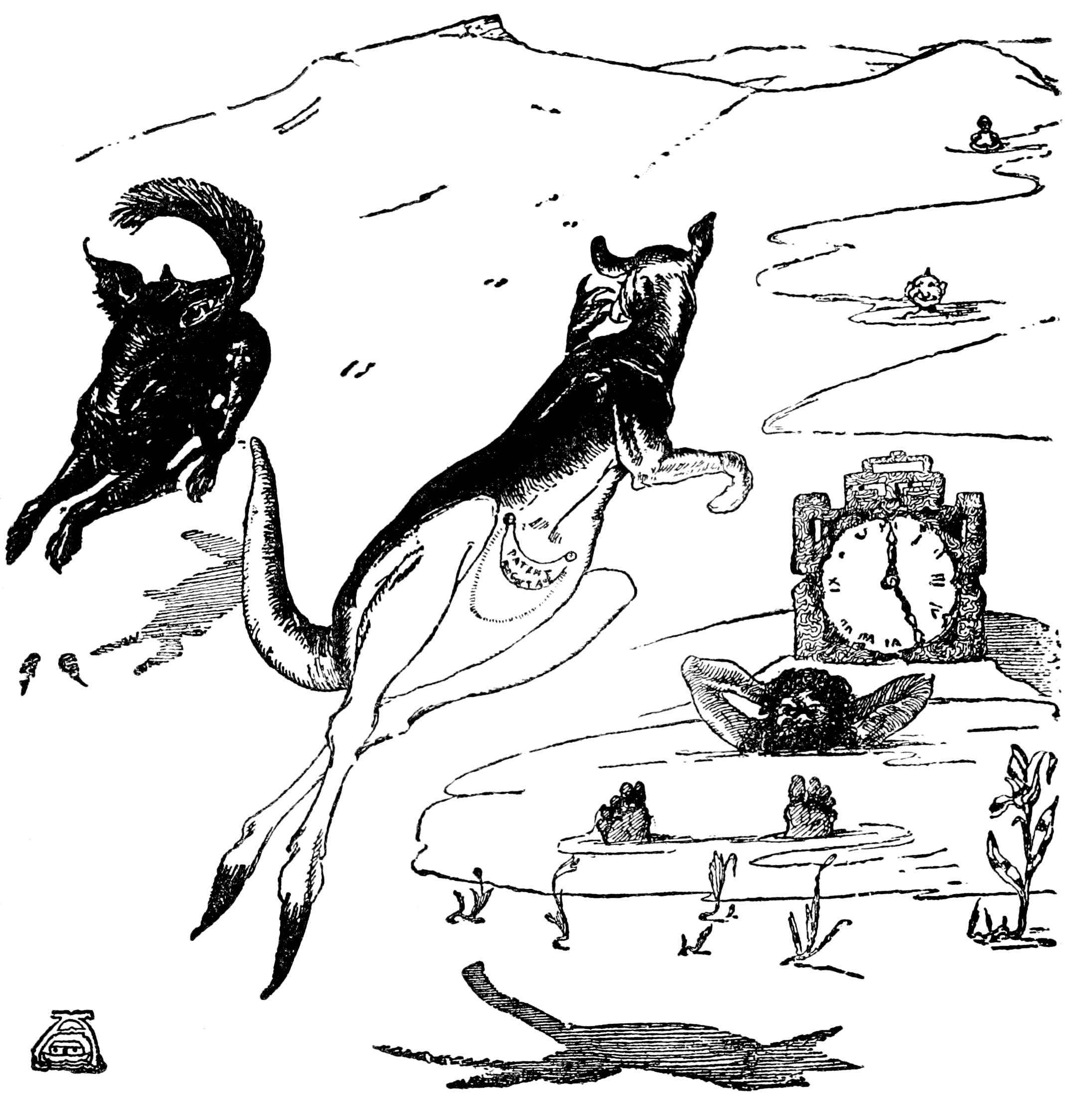
"The Sing-Song of Old Man Kangaroo" from "Rudyard Kipling's Just So Stories"

The story was first told aloud by the author to his daughter Josephine as part of their oral tradition. It was then written down and first published in Ladies' Home Journal in June 1900.

It involves a vain kangaroo who asks three gods to make him unlike other animals, and sought after. Two of them, the Little God Nqa and the Middle God Nquing, refuse, and only the third, the Big God Nqong, accepts. The result is Yellow-Dog Dingo trying to catch Kangaroo all across Australia, explaining how kangaroos came to have strong legs.

== Synopsis ==
A vain kangaroo with 4 short legs longs to be different from the other animals, as well as very truly sought after. The little god Nqa and the middle god Nquing refuse to make him different because of his arrogance and rudeness; however, the big god Nqong accepts his offer, and so he whistles up Yellow Dog dingo to chase him around Australia. This causes the kangaroo's hind legs and tail to be longer, as well as his fur to be red instead of gray.
