= Cape Leeuwin =

Most south-westerly mainland point of the Australian continent

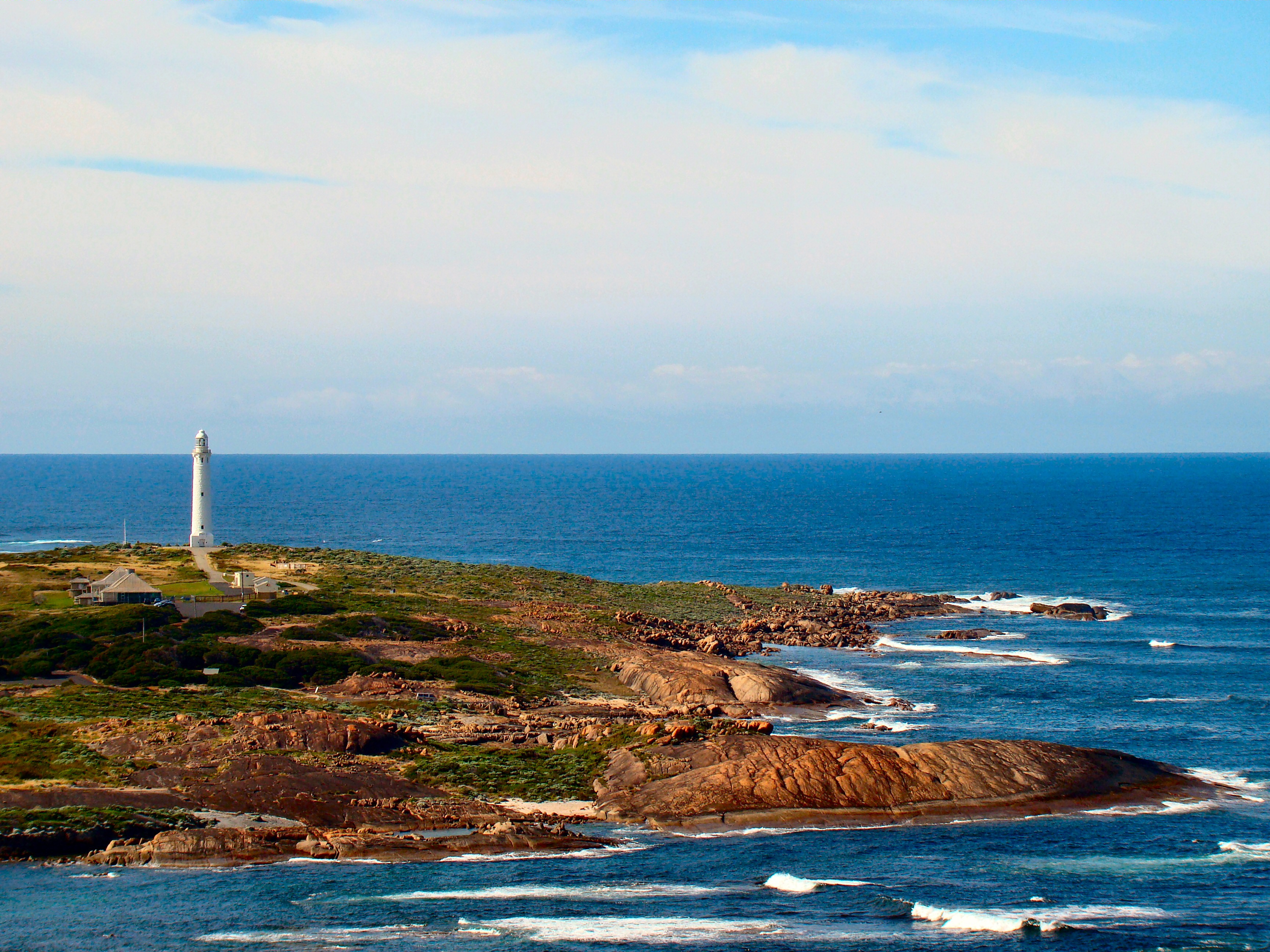
- Cape Leeuwin and the Cape Leeuwin Lighthouse as seen from the north

- Coordinates: 34°22′27″S 115°08′09″E
- Country: Australia
- State: Western Australia
- City: Leeuwin, Shire of Augusta–Margaret River

Cape Leeuwin /ˈluːwɪn/ is the most south-westerly (but not most southerly) mainland point of the Australian continent, in the state of Western Australia.

== Description ==
A few small islands and rocks, the St Alouarn Islands, extend further in Flinders Bay to the east of the cape. The nearest settlement, north of the cape, is Augusta. South-east of Cape Leeuwin, the coast of Western Australia extends much further south. Cape Leeuwin is not the southernmost point of Western Australia, with that distinction belonging to West Cape Howe, which is to the southeast, near Albany.

In Australia, the cape is considered where the Indian Ocean meets the Southern Ocean, but most other nations and bodies define the Southern Ocean as existing south of 60°S.

Located on headland of the cape is the Cape Leeuwin Lighthouse and the buildings that were used by the lighthouse-keepers.

Cape Leeuwin is considered one of the three "great capes" of the world.

== Use of name ==
Cape Leeuwin is often grouped with the next headland north, Cape Naturaliste, to identify the geography and ecology of the region. One example is in the name Leeuwin-Naturaliste National Park. Another is in the use of the phrases "Cape to Cape" or "the Capes" in tourist promotional materials. A shore base and a ship of the Royal Australian Navy have been named HMAS Leeuwin after the cape.

== History ==
The Wardandi, an Aboriginal Australian people, were the first peoples in the area. They called it Doogalup.

The English navigator Matthew Flinders named Cape Leeuwin after the first known ship to have visited the area, Leeuwin (lit. 'Lioness'), a Dutch vessel that charted some of the nearby coastlines in 1622. The log of Leeuwin has been lost, so very little is known of the voyage. However, the land found by Leeuwin was recorded on a 1627 map by Hessel Gerritsz: Caert van't Landt van d'Eendracht (transl. Chart of the Land of Eendracht), which appears to show the coast between present-day Hamelin Bay and Point D'Entrecasteaux. Cape Leeuwin itself cannot be recognised.

Other European vessels passed by for the next two centuries, including the Dutch 't Gulden Zeepaert, commanded by François Thijssen, in 1627 and the French Gros Ventre, under Louis Aleno de St Aloüarn, in 1772.

The first known European sighting of the cape was by Antoine Bruni d'Entrecasteaux in 1791. d'Entrecasteaux thought the cape was an island, and named it St Allouarn Island (Isle St Allouarn), in honour of Captain de St Aloüarn. Ten years later, Matthew Flinders began his survey of the South coast of New Holland from Cape Leeuwin in 1801 when he named it. Flinders landed in the bay to the east of Cape Leeuwin, today's Flinders Bay. Flinders was aware that the area had been known to the Dutch as Leeuwin's Land.

At two in the morning we had 80 fathoms and veered towards the land. It was seen from the masthead at five; and the highest part, the same which had been set in the evening, bore N. 12° W. This is the largest of the before-mentioned Isles of St Alouarn; but at half past seven we saw hills extending from behind, and, to all appearance, joining it to the mainland. This supposed isle is, therefore, what I denominate "Cape Leeuwin", as being the south-western and most projecting part of Leeuwin's Land.

The St Alouarn Islands is a group of islands off the tip of Cape Leeuwin.

== Historic precinct ==
The lighthouse and adjacent buildings, and Cape Leeuwin water wheel are all within the historic precinct as reviewed by government management.

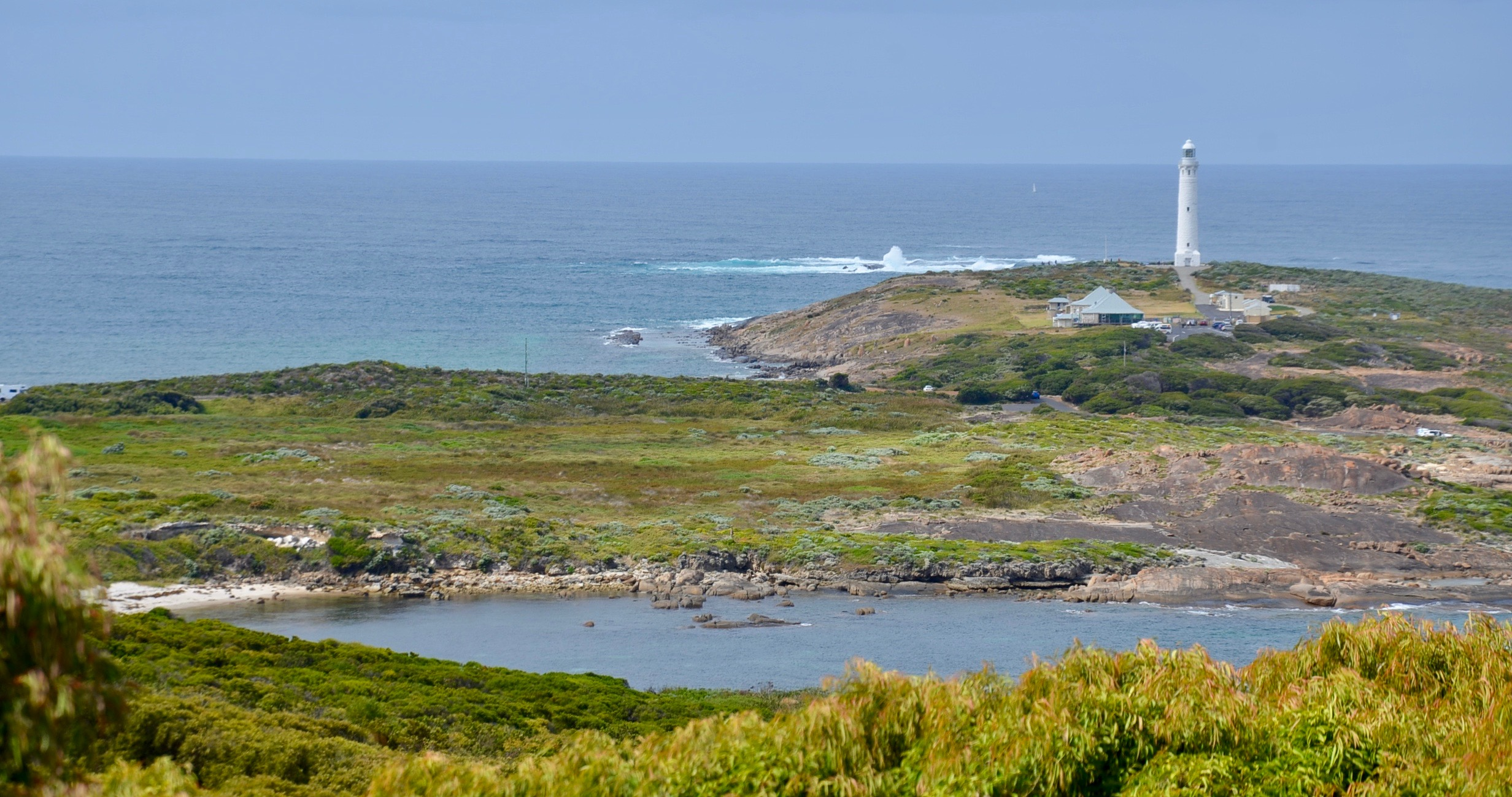
Cape Leeuwin area

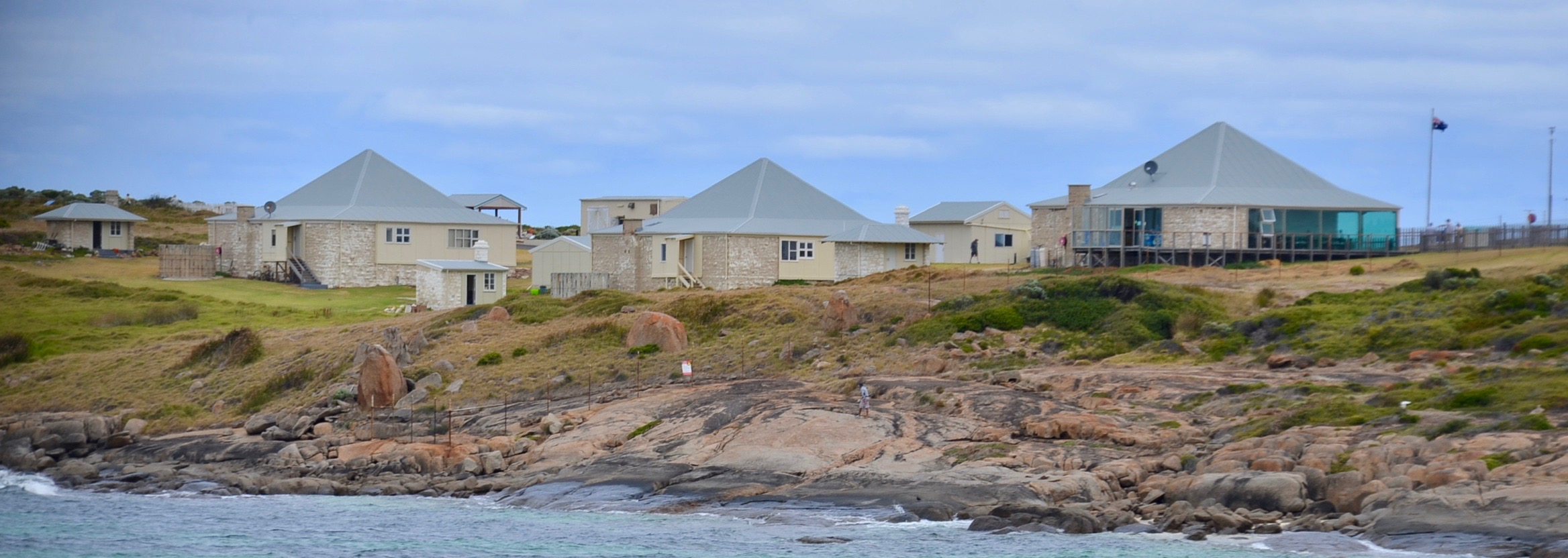
Cottages from the east, Cape Leeuwin

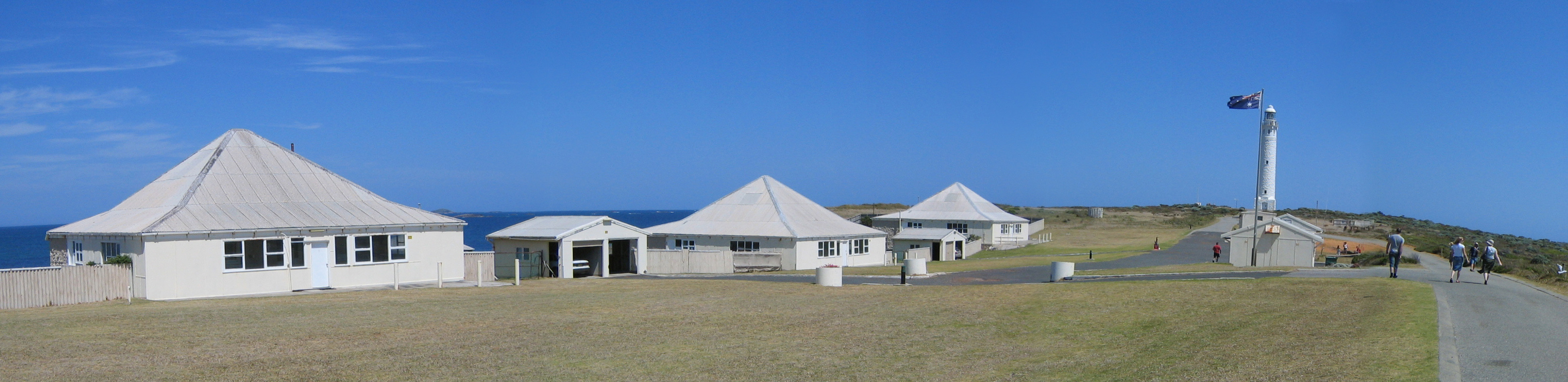
Lighthouse and cottages, Cape Leeuwin

== Climate ==
The climate of Cape Leeuwin is warm-summer Mediterranean (Csb in the Köppen climate classification), with an average annual rainfall of around 954 millimetres (37.6 in). Most rain falls between May and August, when around two days in three record measurable rainfall and around one in ten record over 10 millimetres (0.39 in). During the summer, the weather is warm, though there are usually sea breezes, and frequently sunny. The dry summers, coupled with strong winds, creates an environment where there is always a high risk of bush fires.

Climate data for Cape Leeuwin (normals 1991-2020, extremes 1907-2026)
Month	Jan	Feb	Mar	Apr	May	Jun	Jul	Aug	Sep	Oct	Nov	Dec	Year
Record high °C (°F)	41.0 (105.8)	42.8 (109.0)	39.9 (103.8)	35.0 (95.0)	29.3 (84.7)	24.5 (76.1)	22.5 (72.5)	25.5 (77.9)	29.7 (85.5)	31.8 (89.2)	36.1 (97.0)	39.6 (103.3)	42.8 (109.0)
Mean maximum °C (°F)	28.2 (82.8)	30.2 (86.4)	31.7 (89.1)	28.4 (83.1)	24.7 (76.5)	21.2 (70.2)	20.4 (68.7)	20.9 (69.6)	21.7 (71.1)	24.4 (75.9)	27.3 (81.1)	28.5 (83.3)	34.9 (94.8)
Mean daily maximum °C (°F)	23.2 (73.8)	23.7 (74.7)	23.0 (73.4)	21.8 (71.2)	19.9 (67.8)	18.0 (64.4)	17.0 (62.6)	17.0 (62.6)	17.5 (63.5)	18.8 (65.8)	20.6 (69.1)	22.1 (71.8)	20.2 (68.4)
Daily mean °C (°F)	20.3 (68.5)	20.8 (69.4)	20.2 (68.4)	18.9 (66.0)	17.1 (62.8)	15.4 (59.7)	14.4 (57.9)	14.4 (57.9)	14.9 (58.8)	16.0 (60.8)	17.7 (63.9)	19.2 (66.6)	17.4 (63.4)
Mean daily minimum °C (°F)	17.4 (63.3)	17.8 (64.0)	17.3 (63.1)	16.0 (60.8)	14.2 (57.6)	12.7 (54.9)	11.8 (53.2)	11.8 (53.2)	12.2 (54.0)	13.2 (55.8)	14.7 (58.5)	16.2 (61.2)	14.6 (58.3)
Mean minimum °C (°F)	14.3 (57.7)	14.9 (58.8)	13.4 (56.1)	12.1 (53.8)	10.0 (50.0)	8.9 (48.0)	7.9 (46.2)	8.2 (46.8)	8.6 (47.5)	9.4 (48.9)	10.9 (51.6)	12.9 (55.2)	7.2 (45.0)
Record low °C (°F)	9.4 (48.9)	10.0 (50.0)	8.0 (46.4)	7.2 (45.0)	5.3 (41.5)	3.3 (37.9)	4.4 (39.9)	5.0 (41.0)	4.2 (39.6)	4.3 (39.7)	5.8 (42.4)	9.4 (48.9)	3.3 (37.9)
Average precipitation mm (inches)	14.6 (0.57)	11.2 (0.44)	24.3 (0.96)	42.4 (1.67)	110.1 (4.33)	144.5 (5.69)	157.8 (6.21)	126.2 (4.97)	82.8 (3.26)	44.0 (1.73)	33.7 (1.33)	15.6 (0.61)	807.2 (31.77)
Average precipitation days	5.1	5.3	8.3	13.1	17.8	20.9	23.0	22.8	19.6	14.9	10.4	7.7	168.9
Average relative humidity (%)	63	63	64	64	65	66	66	65	65	64	64	64	64
Average dew point °C (°F)	14.2 (57.6)	14.7 (58.5)	14.2 (57.6)	13.1 (55.6)	11.6 (52.9)	10.1 (50.2)	9.2 (48.6)	8.9 (48.0)	9.3 (48.7)	10.1 (50.2)	11.9 (53.4)	13.2 (55.8)	11.7 (53.1)

== National park ==
The hillside to the west of the lighthouse, and the land nearby is now part of Leeuwin-Naturaliste National Park. It has extensive heath vegetation and thick scrub which supports a very high number of plant species and also bird species that utilise this habitat. The bay just east of Cape Leeuwin is Flinders Bay, named after Matthew Flinders, the circumnavigating explorer of the early 19th century.

== Wrecks ==
Shipwrecks within sight of this location include SS Pericles, an iron-screw steamer built in Belfast in Northern Ireland, which sank after hitting an uncharted rock on a clear calm day in 1910.

The wreck was found by Tom Snider in 1957 at 34°25.33′S 115°08.24′E. He dived on the wreck to recover the lead that was being carried by the ship.

Some shipwrecks are identified as being within the vicinity of Augusta, Cape Leeuwin or Hamelin Bay that might not be within visual distance of the lighthouse.

== In fiction ==
Cape Leeuwin is mentioned in the poem associated with the children's story The Sing-Song of Old Man Kangaroo by Rudyard Kipling. The poem is also the best way for outsiders to learn the cape's correct pronunciation; to rhyme with "flew in".
