= Cape Leeuwin Lighthouse =

Lighthouse in Western Australia

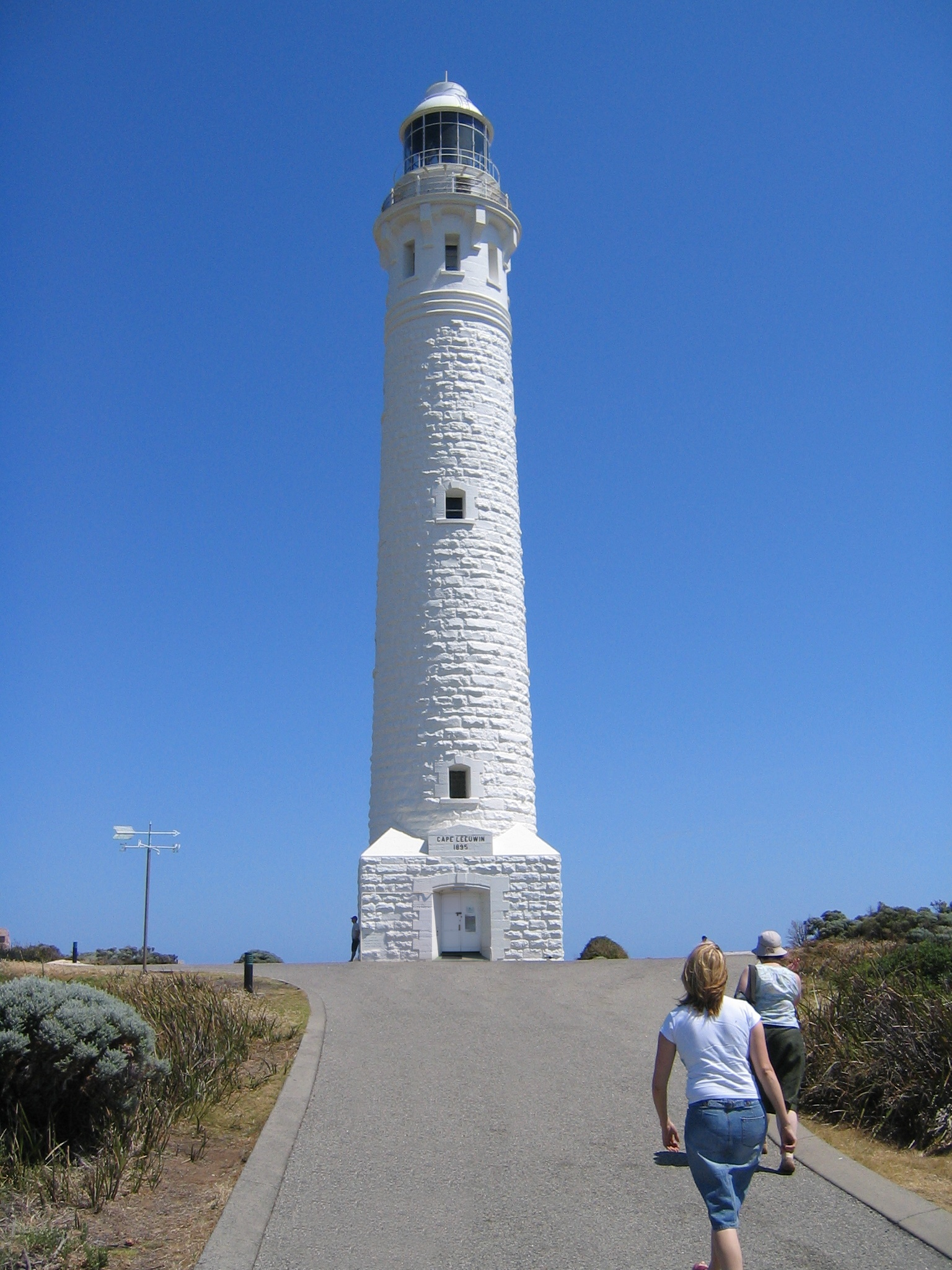
- Cape Leeuwin Lighthouse
- Location: Cape Leeuwin; Western Australia
- Coordinates: 34°22′27″S 115°08′09″E

Tower
- Construction: limestone tower
- Height: 39 metres (128 ft)
- Shape: cylindrical tower on square base
- Markings: white tower and lantern
- Heritage: listed on the Commonwealth Heritage List, State Registered Place

Light
- First lit: 1895
- Focal height: 57 metres (187 ft)
- Lens: First order Chance Brothers Fresnel lens
- Characteristic: Fl W 7.5s.

Commonwealth Heritage List
- Official name: Cape Leeuwin Lighthouse
- Type: Listed place (Historic)
- Designated: 22 June 2004
- Reference no.: 105416

Western Australia Heritage Register
- Type: State Registered Place
- Designated: 13 May 2005
- Reference no.: 104

The Cape Leeuwin Lighthouse is a lighthouse located on the headland of Cape Leeuwin, /ˈluːwɪn/ the most south-westerly point on the mainland of the Australian Continent, in the state of Western Australia.

Cape Leeuwin Lighthouse was constructed by a company led by M. C. Davies, with George Temple Poole supervising the construction of the light and designing the keepers' quarters. The light tower, which is built of local stone, was originally designed to show two lights – a higher white light and a lower red light. Although the foundations were completed, the lower light was never installed. It was opened with great ceremony in 1895 by John Forrest, the Premier of Western Australia. Until June 1982 the lens was rotated by a counter weight driving a clockwork mechanism, and the beacon was a pressure kerosene mantle type. A radio navigation beacon was commissioned in 1955 and operated until 1992. The lighthouse was automated in 1982. The lighthouse, besides being a navigational aid, serves as an important automatic weather station. The lighthouse's buildings and grounds are now vested in the local tourism body and the single (1960s) and double (1980s) communications towers that were north-west of the lighthouse, seen in older photographs of Cape Leeuwin, have been removed.

The nearest active lighthouse north of Cape Leeuwin is the much smaller Foul Bay lighthouse, just south of the Hamelin Bay camping area. The remains of the 1938 Hamelin Island lighthouse can be clearly seen from the bay.

Felix von Luckner, a German World War I war hero, noted for his long voyage on the Seeadler during which he captured 14 enemy ships, claimed that he was briefly an assistant lightkeeper at Cape Leeuwin in his youth. The story about von Luckner at Cape Leeuwin has now been called into question.

International Lighthouse Day was celebrated at Cape Leeuwin lighthouse for the first time in 2004. The climb to the gallery consists of 176 steps.

== Picture gallery ==
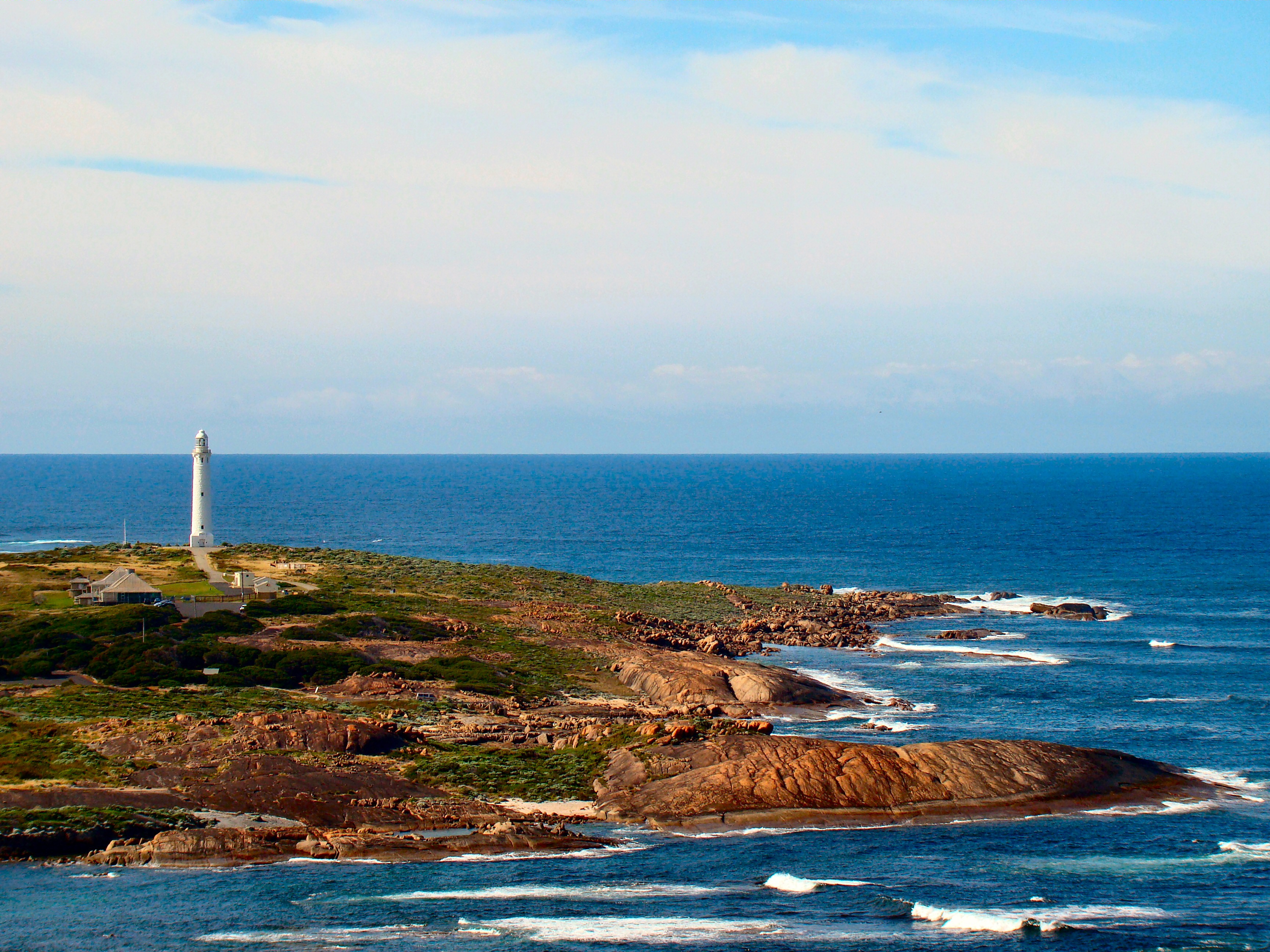
Cape Leeuwin and lighthouse as seen from the north

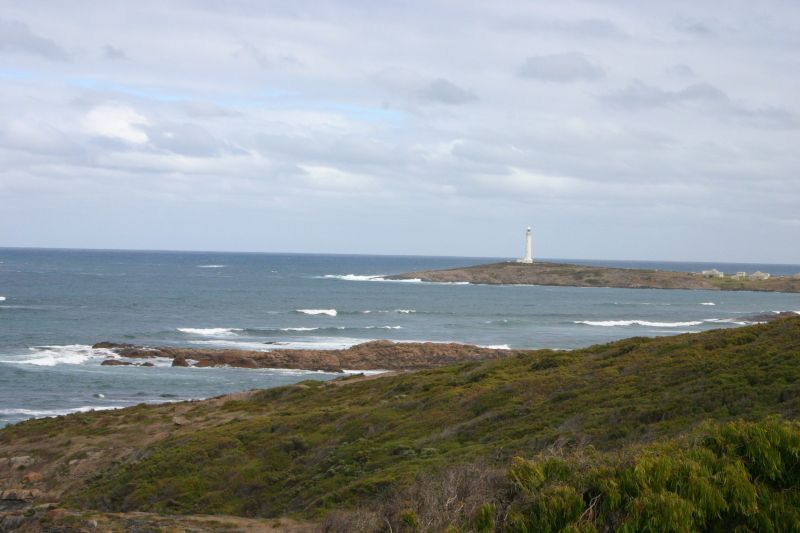
Cape Leeuwin seen from the east

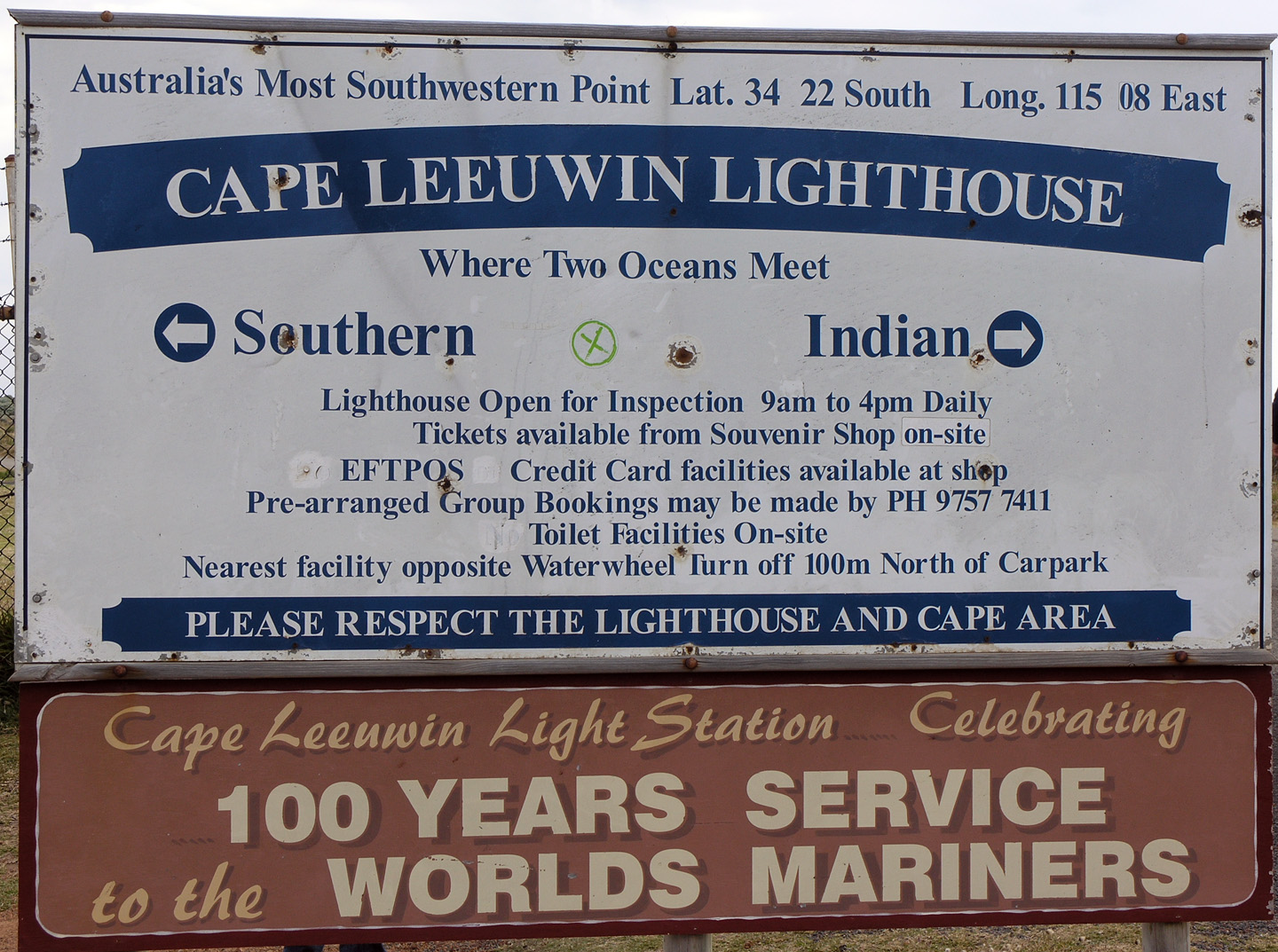
Sign at Cape Leeuwin Lighthouse.

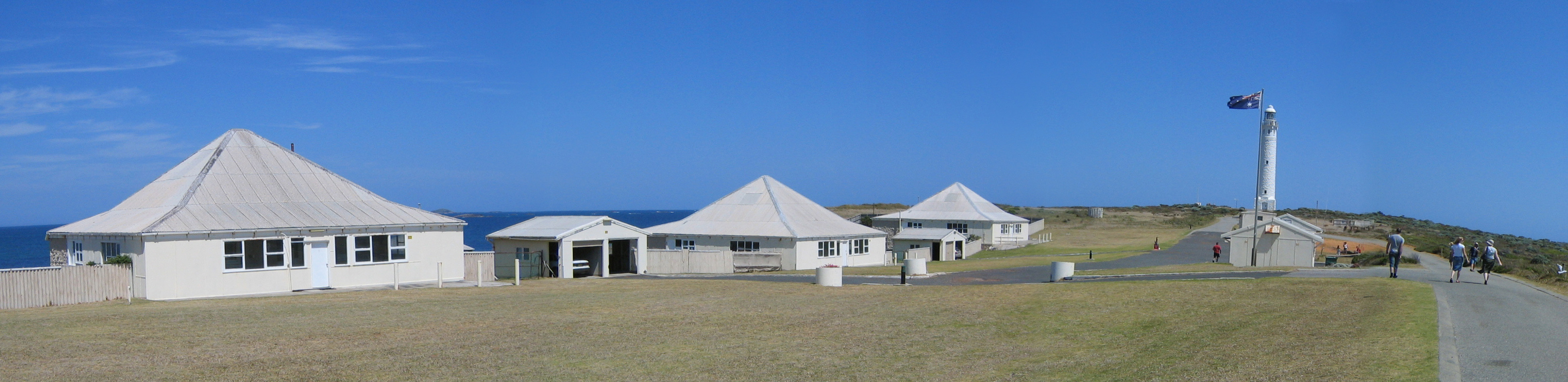
Lighthouse and cottages, Cape Leeuwin

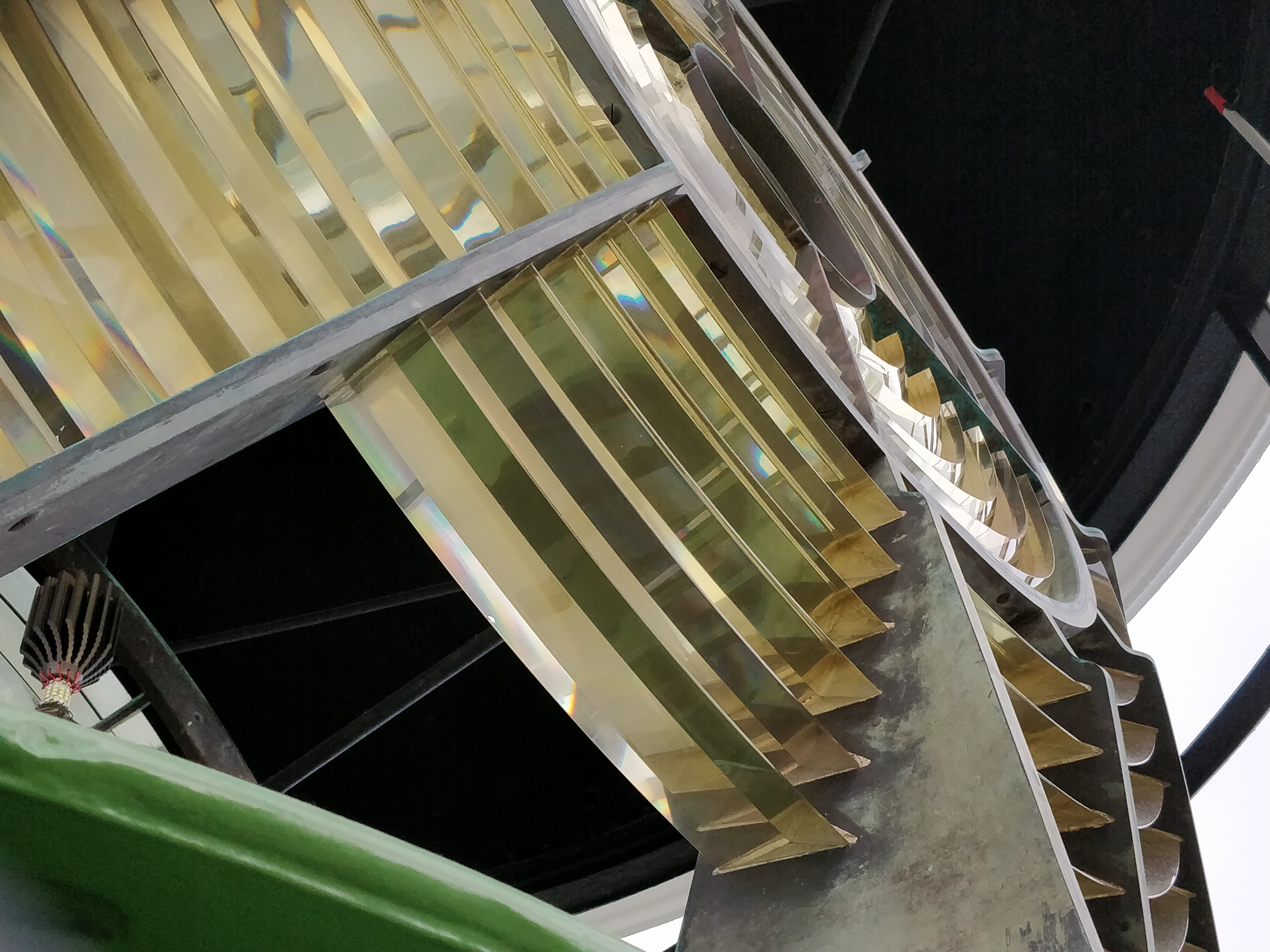
The Fresnel lens in Cape Leeuwin lighthouse

== See also ==
- List of lighthouses in Australia
- Cape Leeuwin water wheel
