= List of State Register of Heritage Places in the Shire of Augusta-Margaret River =

List of heritage places in South West region of Western Australia

The State Register of Heritage Places is maintained by the Heritage Council of Western Australia. As of 2026, 144 places are heritage-listed in the Shire of Augusta Margaret River, of which eleven are on the State Register of Heritage Places.

== List ==
The Western Australian State Register of Heritage Places, as of 2026, lists the following eleven state registered places within the Shire of Augusta-Margaret River:

Place name	Place #	Street number	Street name	Suburb or town	Co-ordinates	Notes & former names	Photo
Cape Leeuwin Lighthouse and Quarters	104		Leeuwin Road	Cape Leeuwin	34.374167°S 115.135833°E		
Cape Leeuwin Waterwheel	106		Leeuwin Road, Quarry Bay	Cape Leeuwin	34.367346°S 115.138506°E		
Basildene Farmhouse	107	187	Wallcliffe Road	Margaret River	33.971075°S 114.995167°E		
Margaret River Hotel	108	125	Bussell Highway	Margaret River	33.951431°S 115.074073°E		
Wallcliffe House & Landscape	114		Wallcliffe Road	Prevelly	33.956534°S 115.053320°E	Wallcliffe	
Ellensbrook	115	Lot 303	Ellen Brook Road	Yebble	33.9103°S 114.992°E	Ellensbrook Farm Home for Aboriginal Children, Ellensbrook Farmhouse, Dam & Waterfall	
Glenbourne Homestead	116	134	Old Ellen Brook Road	Gracetown	33.915326°S 115.011229°E		
Davies Park & Foundry Chimney	124		Caves Road	Karridale	34.210607°S 115.075804°E	Old Karridale Townsite Chimney, Karridale Townsite Chimney	
Old Hospital Complex	3314	27	Tunbridge Street	Margaret River	33.950595°S 115.071342°E	Margaret River Resource Centre, Margaret Cecil Building, Nurses Quarters	
Darnell's General Store	4946	3	Redgate Road	Witchcliffe	34.025732°S 115.099488°E	Fearn's Cash Store	
Memorial - HMAS Nizam, Cape Leeuwin Lighthouse	4976		Leeuwin Road	Cape Leeuwin	34.375092°S 115.136584°E		
