= Wallcliffe House =

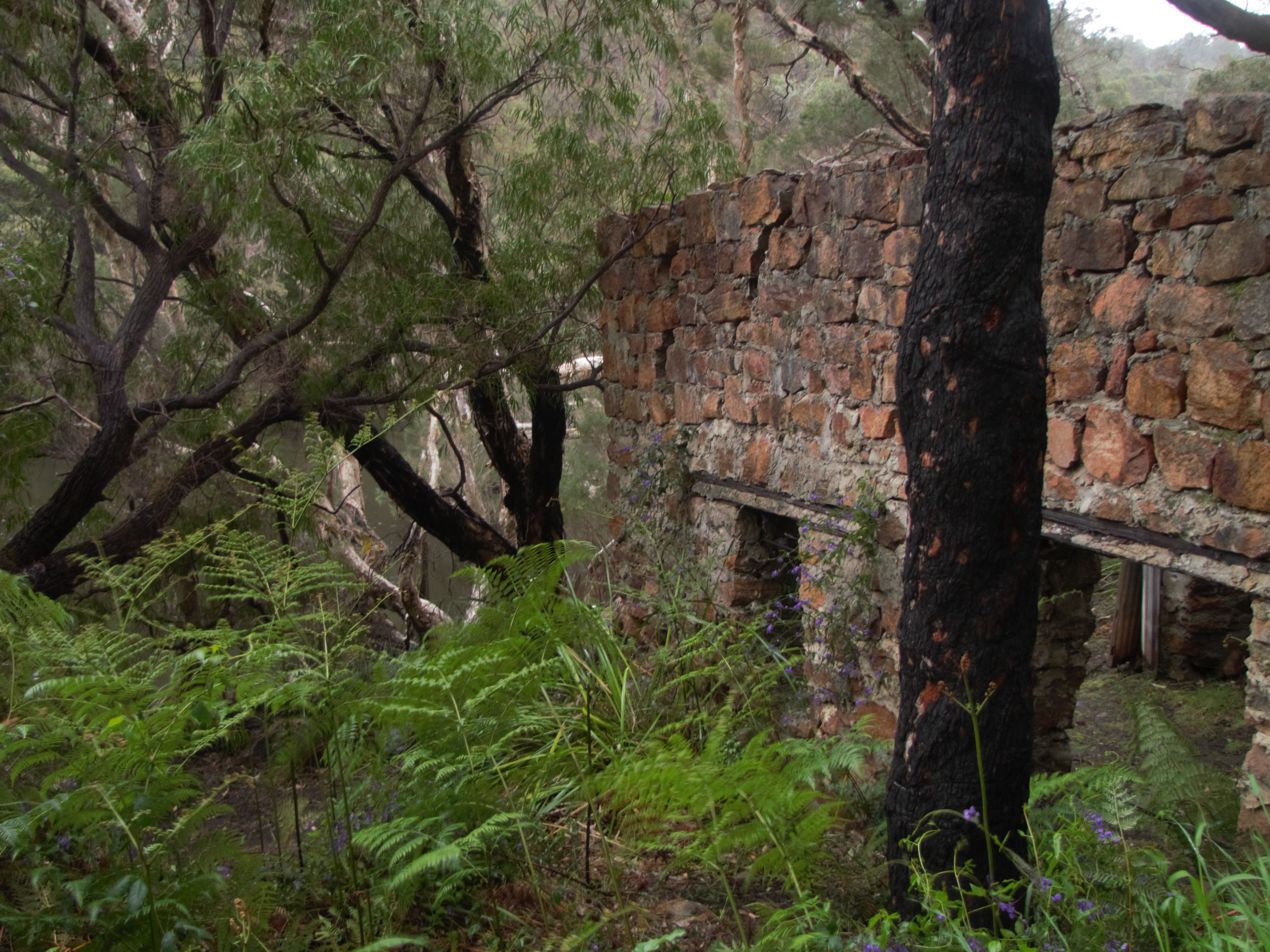
- The Ruins of Wallcliffe House in September 2016

- Location within Western Australia

General information
- Type: Homestead
- Location: Prevelly, Western Australia
- Coordinates: 33.971075°S 114.995167°E

Western Australia Heritage Register
- Designated: 26 August 2005
- Reference no.: 114

Wallcliffe House was a heritage listed two-storey stone, shingle and corrugated iron homestead located near Prevelly and the mouth of the Margaret River in Western Australia. It was built by George Holland Knapton for owners Alfred and Ellen Bussell (née Heppingstone) between 1857 and 1865 in the Victorian-Georgian style, using limestone quarried on the property and pit-sawn jarrah.

Wallcliffe was the centerpiece of the Bussell family's 24,000-hectare (59,000-acre) estate which extended from Cowaramup to the Donnelly River.

Before moving to Wallcliffe, the Bussells lived at "Ellensbrook", a 4-hectare (10-acre) holding several miles north of the Margaret River on the northern edge of their lease. In 1876, Grace Bussell and Sam Isaacs helped save the lives of around 50 people as the SS Georgette sunk off nearby Calgardup Bay. The property went out of the Bussell family in 1896, when it was sold to Busselton farmer Richard Gale, after the Union Bank of Australia foreclosed. In 1902 Gale onsold the estate to A. C. R. Loaring and Neil McLeod, who later sold Wallcliffe House and 16 hectares (40 acres) of land to Filumena Terry (née Bussell) in 1910/11. The property stayed in the Bussell/Terry family until 1987. The southern coastal portion of the Wallcliffe property was sold in 1953 to be used as a caravan park and for camping. That area was subsequently subdivided and parts later became the township of Prevelly.

In 1988–89 Wallcliffe House was renovated extensively by the then owners Mark and Cate Hohnen and since then has been used for private purposes. The property is currently owned by Rose Chaney, wife of prominent Western Australian businessman Michael Chaney.

In November 2011 the homestead was destroyed by a major bushfire in the area.
