= List of State Register of Heritage Places in the Shire of Lake Grace =

List of heritage sites in Western Australia

The State Register of Heritage Places is maintained by the Heritage Council of Western Australia. As of 2026, 231 places are heritage-listed in the Shire of Lake Grace, of which five are on the State Register of Heritage Places.

== List ==
The Western Australian State Register of Heritage Places, as of 2026, lists the following five state registered places within the Shire of Lake Grace:

| Place name | Place # | Street number | Street name | Suburb or town | Co-ordinates | Notes & former names | Photo |
|---|---|---|---|---|---|---|---|
| Newdegate Arts and Crafts Building | 1448 | Corner | Mitchell & Collier Street | Newdegate | 33.094364°S 119.022666°E | Grand Cafe Hainsworth's, Store, Jaycees Museum, The Hainsworth Building | |
| Lake Grace Hospital | 12670 | | Memorial Drive | Lake Grace | 33.10238°S 118.452705°E | Australian Inland Mission Hospital (former) | |
| James' Tank and Earth Catchment | 19900 | | | Lake Grace | | AA Number 190 Part of the AA Dam No 190 James, Lake Grace precinct (26460) | |
| Lake Grace Hospital Precinct | 24695 | | Stubbs Street | Lake Grace | 33.10238°S 118.452973°E | | |
| AA Dam No 190 James, Lake Grace | 26460 | | Kulin-Lake Grace Road | North Lake Grace | 33.027063°S 118.471452°E | | |
