= Acacia diaphyllodinea =

Scientific classification
- Kingdom: Plantae
- Clade: Tracheophytes
- Clade: Angiosperms
- Clade: Eudicots
- Clade: Rosids
- Order: Fabales
- Family: Fabaceae
- Subfamily: Caesalpinioideae
- Clade: Mimosoid clade
- Genus: Acacia
- Species: A. diaphyllodinea

Binomial name
- Acacia diaphyllodinea Maslin
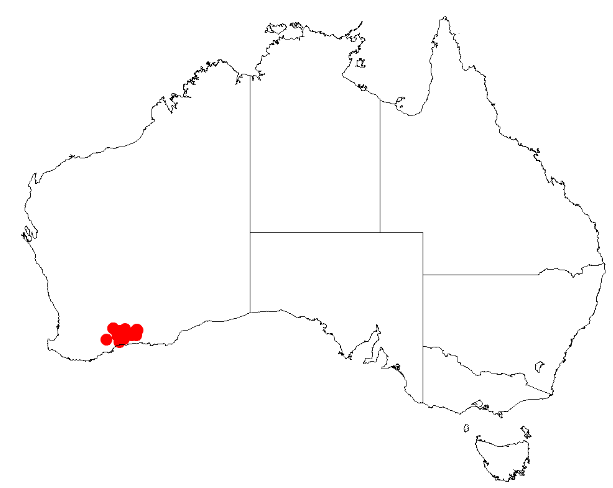
- Occurrence data from AVH

Synonyms
- Racosperma diaphyllodineum (Maslin) Pedley

Species of legume

Acacia diaphyllodinea is a species of flowering plant in the family Fabaceae and is endemic to the south-west of Western Australia. It is a spreading, glabrous shrub with ascending to erect, narrowly oblong to lance-shaped and horizontally flattened phyllodes, spherical heads of golden yellow flowers and narrowly oblong, curved, coiled or s-shaped, thinly leathery to papery pods.

== Description ==
Acacia diaphyllodinea is a spreading, glabrous shrub that typically grows to a height of 30–70 cm (12–28 in). Its phyllodes are ascending to erect, narrowly oblong to oblong or lance-shaped with the narrower end towards the base, horizontally flattened, 8–15 mm (0.31–0.59 in) long, 2–3.5 mm (0.079–0.138 in) wide and green to more or less glaucous. There is a midrib on the lower surface of the phyllodes. The flowers are borne in spherical heads in two racemes in axils on peduncles 5–8 mm (0.20–0.31 in) long. The heads are about 4 mm (0.16 in) in diameter with 13 to 15 golden yellow flowers. Flowering occurs from June to September, and the pods are narrowly oblong and curved, more or less coiled or s-shaped, up to 40 mm (1.6 in) long, 5–7 mm (0.20–0.28 in) wide and thinly leathery to papery. The seeds are egg-shaped, about 3 mm (0.12 in) long and mottled brown with an aril.

== Taxonomy ==
Acacia diaphyllodinea was first formally described in 1978 by Bruce Maslin in the journal Nuytsia from specimens he collected about 7 km (4.3 mi) south of Mount Madden towards Ravensthorpe in 1973. The specific epithet (diaphyllodinea) alludes to the obvious horizontal flattening of the phyllodes.

== Distribution and habitat ==
This species of wattle occurs from Lake Varley and Frank Hann National Park to about Ravensthorpe and grows in sandy soil or loamy clay in open scrub or low shrubland, in the Esperance Plains and Mallee bioregions of south-western Western Australia.

== Conservation status ==
Acacia diaphyllodinea is listed as "not threatened" by the Government of Western Australia Department of Biodiversity, Conservation and Attractions.

== See also ==
- List of Acacia species
