= Yebble, Western Australia =

Place in Western Australia

Yebble
- Town
- Coordinates: 33°54′28″S 114°59′31″E
- Country: Australia
- State: Western Australia
- LGA(s): Shire of Augusta-Margaret River
- Location: 14 km (8.7 mi) from Margaret River
- Established: 2021

Government
  - State electorate(s): Vasse Warren-Blackwood
  - Federal division(s): Forrest

Area
  - Total: 18.1 km^{2} (7.0 sq mi)
- Postcode: 6285

Yebble is a locality in the South West region of Western Australia in the Shire of Augusta-Margaret River. Established in 2021 from parts of the localities of Gracetown and Burnside, its name honours Sam Isaacs, whose Aboriginal name (in the Wardandi group of the Nyungar language) was Yebble, a stockman who was involved with Grace Bussell in the rescue of SS Georgette in 1876.

The locality is mostly covered by the Leeuwin-Naturaliste National Park and also contains Ellensbrook homestead and the Meekadarribee Falls, which are significant to the local Wardandi people. Yebble is near the land that was granted to Isaacs by the Government of Western Australia.
