= Lake Grace, Western Australia =

Town in the Wheatbelt region of Western Australia

Lake Grace
- Town
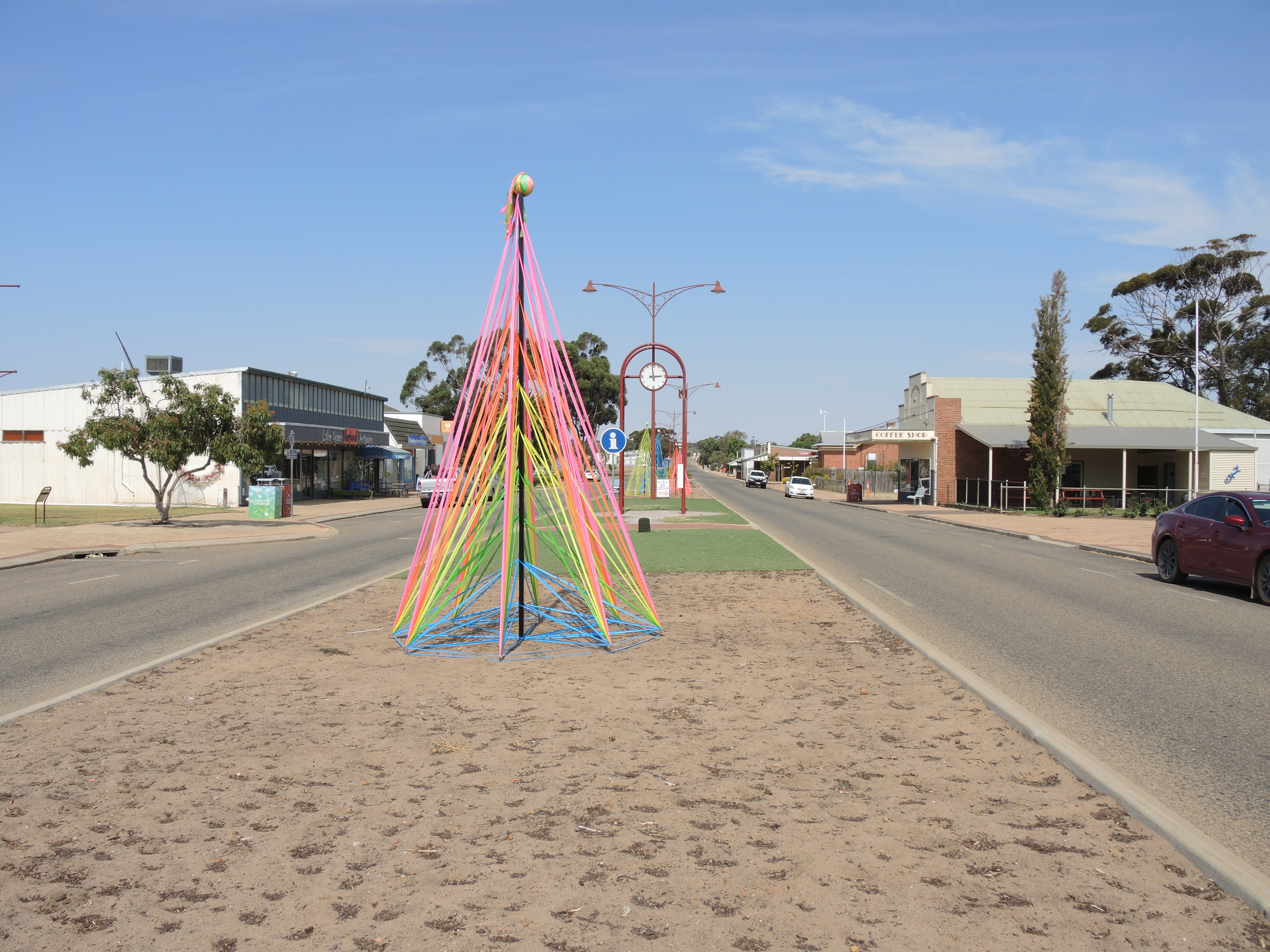
- Stubbs Street, the main street in Lake Grace

- Interactive map of Lake Grace
- Coordinates: 33.101°S 118.460°E
- Country: Australia
- State: Western Australia
- LGA: Shire of Lake Grace
- Location: 345 km (214 mi) ESE of Perth; 119 km (74 mi) east of Wagin
- Established: 1911

Government
  - State electorate: Roe
  - Federal division: O'Connor

Area
  - Total: 96.2 km^{2} (37.1 sq mi)
- Elevation: 286 m (938 ft)

Population
  - Total: 477 (UCL 2021)
- Postcode: 6353
- Mean max temp: 23.2 °C (73.8 °F)
- Mean min temp: 10.1 °C (50.2 °F)
- Annual rainfall: 353.3 mm (13.91 in)

Lake Grace is a town in the eastern Wheatbelt region of Western Australia, 345 kilometres (214 mi) from Perth along State Route 107 between Wagin and Ravensthorpe. It is the main town in the Shire of Lake Grace. At the 2021 census, Lake Grace had a population of 477.

== History ==
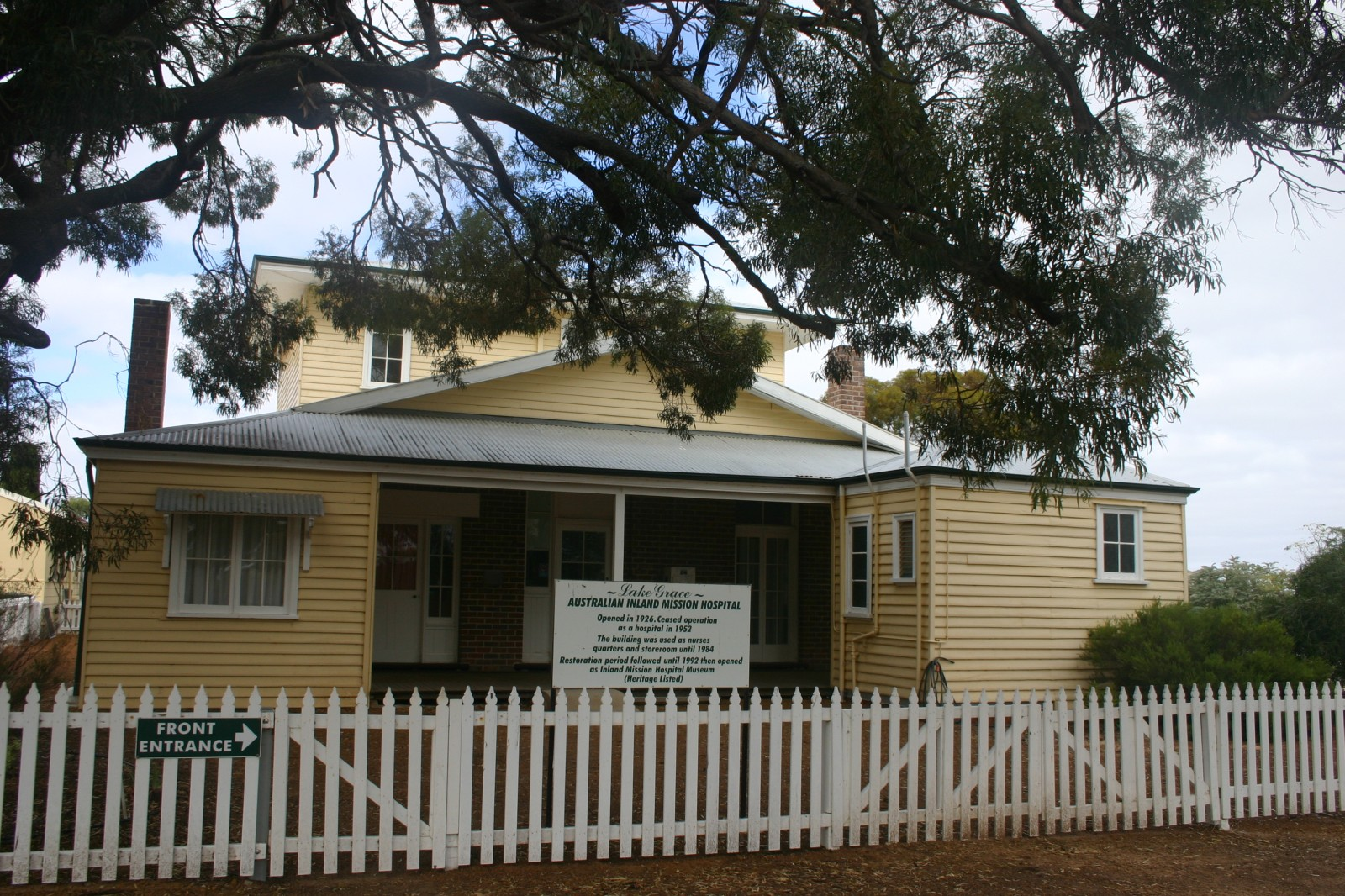
Lake Grace Australian Inland Mission Hospital Museum

The area was first taken up for agriculture around 1911. In 1913 a school was established and named Lake Grace after the nearby lake. In 1914 the government planned to extend the railway network from Kukerin to Lake Grace, and local settlers lobbied for a townsite to be declared at the terminus. The Newdegate railway line was completed on 25 November 1916, and terminated close to the site of the existing school. The townsite of Lake Grace was gazetted later in 1916. The railway line was extended to its ultimate terminus at Newdegate on 15 February 1926. The Hyden railway line from Lake Grace to Hyden opened on 5 April 1933, making Lake Grace a junction station. The former railway station building is owned by the Shire of Lake Grace for community use.

In 1922 the Reverend John Flynn visited the town to assess the suitability for establishing an Australian Inland Mission (AIM) hospital. The Government of Western Australia agreed to subsidise the building of the hospital, which was subsequently built by AIM and opened in April 1926 staffed by two nurses, Olive Bennett and Helen Cousin. In July 1934 the Lake Grace Hospital Board repaid the loan from the Australian Inland Mission and took over the ownership of the hospital. The hospital served an area of 26,000 square kilometres (10,000 sq mi) including providing maternity ward facilities. The hospital ceased operation in 1952 with the construction and replacement by the Lake Grace Memorial Hospital. The Lake Grace AIM Hospital building was in disrepair by 1983 with the state Government deciding to demolish the building. Protests by former staff and the local community halted the destruction, and the building was restored as a museum with the help of the Lake Grace Shire Council and the local community.

The building is one of three remaining Australian Inland Mission hospitals and is listed on local, state and national heritage registers. The lake after which the townsite was named was given the name Lake Grace by Marshall Fox, the District Surveyor, in 1910. It is named after Grace Brockman (née Bussell), the wife of the Surveyor General, Frederick Brockman. Grace had become famous in 1876 when she and the Bussell family's stockman Sam Isaacs rescued many people from the wreck of SS Georgette near the mouth of the Margaret River.

== Economy and transportation ==
The surrounding areas produce wheat and other cereal crops. The town is a receival site for the CBH Group. Recently changes have included the development of the "Multi Art Space", the introduction of a visitor centre in the old station master's house and an improved townscape.

The town is served by Transwa's Perth to Esperance coach service.

== Geography ==
=== Climate ===
Lake Grace experiences a cool semi-arid climate (Köppen BSk) with hot, dry summers and mild, damp winters. Mornings are however pleasant in summer and chilly in winter.

Climate data for Lake Grace
Month	Jan	Feb	Mar	Apr	May	Jun	Jul	Aug	Sep	Oct	Nov	Dec	Year
Record high °C (°F)	45.0 (113.0)	46.1 (115.0)	40.6 (105.1)	36.7 (98.1)	32.7 (90.9)	24.3 (75.7)	23.4 (74.1)	28.7 (83.7)	32.1 (89.8)	37.2 (99.0)	41.7 (107.1)	43.2 (109.8)	46.1 (115.0)
Mean daily maximum °C (°F)	31.4 (88.5)	30.6 (87.1)	28.1 (82.6)	23.8 (74.8)	19.7 (67.5)	16.5 (61.7)	15.4 (59.7)	16.4 (61.5)	19.1 (66.4)	22.8 (73.0)	26.5 (79.7)	29.6 (85.3)	23.3 (73.9)
Mean daily minimum °C (°F)	15.0 (59.0)	15.2 (59.4)	14.1 (57.4)	11.5 (52.7)	8.6 (47.5)	6.7 (44.1)	5.6 (42.1)	5.5 (41.9)	6.7 (44.1)	8.6 (47.5)	11.3 (52.3)	13.4 (56.1)	10.2 (50.4)
Record low °C (°F)	5.3 (41.5)	7.3 (45.1)	4.0 (39.2)	0.6 (33.1)	−0.3 (31.5)	−1.4 (29.5)	−1.4 (29.5)	−1.7 (28.9)	−2.1 (28.2)	−0.6 (30.9)	1.1 (34.0)	4.5 (40.1)	−2.1 (28.2)
Average rainfall mm (inches)	18.5 (0.73)	18.6 (0.73)	22.5 (0.89)	23.4 (0.92)	43.3 (1.70)	51.2 (2.02)	47.7 (1.88)	40.6 (1.60)	30.6 (1.20)	22.9 (0.90)	18.2 (0.72)	14.5 (0.57)	352.0 (13.86)
Average rainy days (≥ 1.0 mm)	1.8	2.1	2.6	3.8	6.3	8.7	9.0	7.9	6.5	4.5	2.9	2.2	58.3
Source: Bureau of Meteorology

=== Natural disasters ===
A hail storm on 16 October 2005 destroyed 500 hectares of wheat and barley crop and damaged a further 5,500 hectares or 14,000 acres, with some farmers reporting fields covered by up to 0.25 m (9.8 in) of hail and kilometres of road turned white. It was accompanied by about 60 mm of rainfall.

On 13 January 2006, the town was flooded by Cyclone Clare, receiving 230 millimetres or 9.1 inches of rainfall. It was declared a disaster zone by the State Government. Just over two weeks later, the town received another 30 millimetres or 1.2 inches of rain from Cyclone Emma. Large pumps were brought in to help dry out flooded roads, and the main highway to Perth was reopened six weeks later. Lake Grace normally receives 353.3 millimetres or 13.91 inches of rainfall per annum and only 16.3 millimetres or 0.64 inches in January.

== Notable people ==
- Nat Fyfe, AFL 2015/2019 Brownlow Medalist
- Cale Morton, AFL player
- Belinda Smith, AFLW player
- Liam Baker, AFL player
