= Iain Eairdsidh MacAsgaill =

Scottish poet and piper

Iain Eairdsidh MacAsgaill (19 February 1898 – 4 June 1934), alias the Bàrd Bheàrnaraigh ("the Bard of Berneray") was a Scottish World War I veteran of the King's Own Cameron Highlanders, a Western Australian bush poet in Scottish Gaelic, and a highly important figure in 20th-century Scottish Gaelic literature. He was also known as Iain Archie MacAskill and John Archie MacAskill. His Gaelic genealogical name was Iain-Eirdsidh Dhòmhnaill Thormoid-Shaighdeir ("John Archie son of Donald son of Norman the soldier.").

== Life ==
He was born on 19 February 1898 in Berneray, Harris, he was the son of Dòmhnaill MacAsgaill (Scottish Gaelic: Dòmhnaill Tharmaid Shaighdeir) (1873–1955) and Anna Chaluim Mhoireasdan. He had three sisters, Effie, Mary, and Kate and four brothers, Norman, Alexander, Malcolm, and John.

=== Scotland ===
He attended the Berneray School between 1903 and 1912.

The editor of MacAsgaill's posthumous 1961 poetry collection, Alick Morrison, is also the poet's first biographer and has left behind a detailed account of his childhood in the Outer Hebrides during the early 20th century. According to Ronald Black, the culture clash between the Gaelic oral literature taught at the Ceilidh houses and the Anglicisation enforced through corporal punishment in the schools after the 1872 Education Act is crucial to understanding Iain Eairsidh MacAsgaill and all other Gaels of his generation. As Alick Morrison wrote, "Gaelic culture reigned supreme all over the island except one spot; it stopped dead at the threshold of Berneray Public School."

In 1911, he and his sister Effie lived with their mother's parents, Calum and Effie Moireasdan, at Croft 3, Borbh. When he left school, he found employment as a shepherd and worked for Calum MacLeòid for seven years at Sandhill. During the First World War, he left MacLeòid's employment to enlist in the 5th (Service) Battalion, Cameron Highlanders. Along with the rest of his battalion, he landed at Boulogne-sur-Mer as part of the 26th Brigade in the 9th (Scottish) Division in May 1915. At the age of 17, he saw combat at the Battle of Festubert and the Battle of Givenchy. MacAsgaill was also one of the regimental bagpipers who led the Cameron Highlanders over the top on the first day of the Battle of Loos. Three of his fellow pipers were killed and eighteen were wounded, but, even though the ribbons were shot off of MacAsgaill's pipes, he survived the Battle of Loos unscathed.

At the end of the war, he was moved from the 5th to the 3rd battalion. In October 1919, Iain Eairdsidh obtained employment as a constable for the City of Glasgow Police. He also played in the Glasgow Police Pipe Band and won the World Prize in 1920. After four years, in 1923, he left the police force and returned to Berneray, where he worked as an agricultural laborer for Reverend Tormod Moireasdan and began for the first time to versify in earnest.

=== In Australia ===
In 1924, Iain Eairdsidh decided to emigrate and take advantage of a Government scheme to settle 75,000 immigrants over five years in Western Australia. There were attractive opportunities in Australia for young people willing to work on the land. He sailed on New Year's Day 1925 on SS Themistocles.

Initially, he received a 1,500 acre wheat farm, which he dubbed, 'Borvedale' near Lake Varley, Shire of Lake Grace, located in the Wheatbelt one-hundred miles east of Fremantle, in Western Australia. At Borvedale, MacAsgaill owned a house, a lorry, and a horse whom he named "Prince Charlie". MacAsgail also employed an Indigenous Australian servant, whom he suspected of being in league with the local Noongar Aboriginal Australians, who sometimes stole MacAsgaill's chickens and other property.

His health broke and he was in debt. Against his will, his brother, Calum, came from Ontario to help him. Calum returned after two years, but Iain Eairdsidh's affairs only worsened.

The Great Depression made wheat farming unprofitable. MacAsgaill lost Borvedale, and had to earn his livelihood by working as a hired hand on another farm. Most of his Gaelic poems and songs were composed during this period, in which MacAsgaill suffered greatly from homesickness and bitterly regretted his decision to leave behind the happy life he had known in both Berneray and Glasgow. MacAsgaill had always been fond of drinking, but now that ceased to help him.

== Death and legacy ==
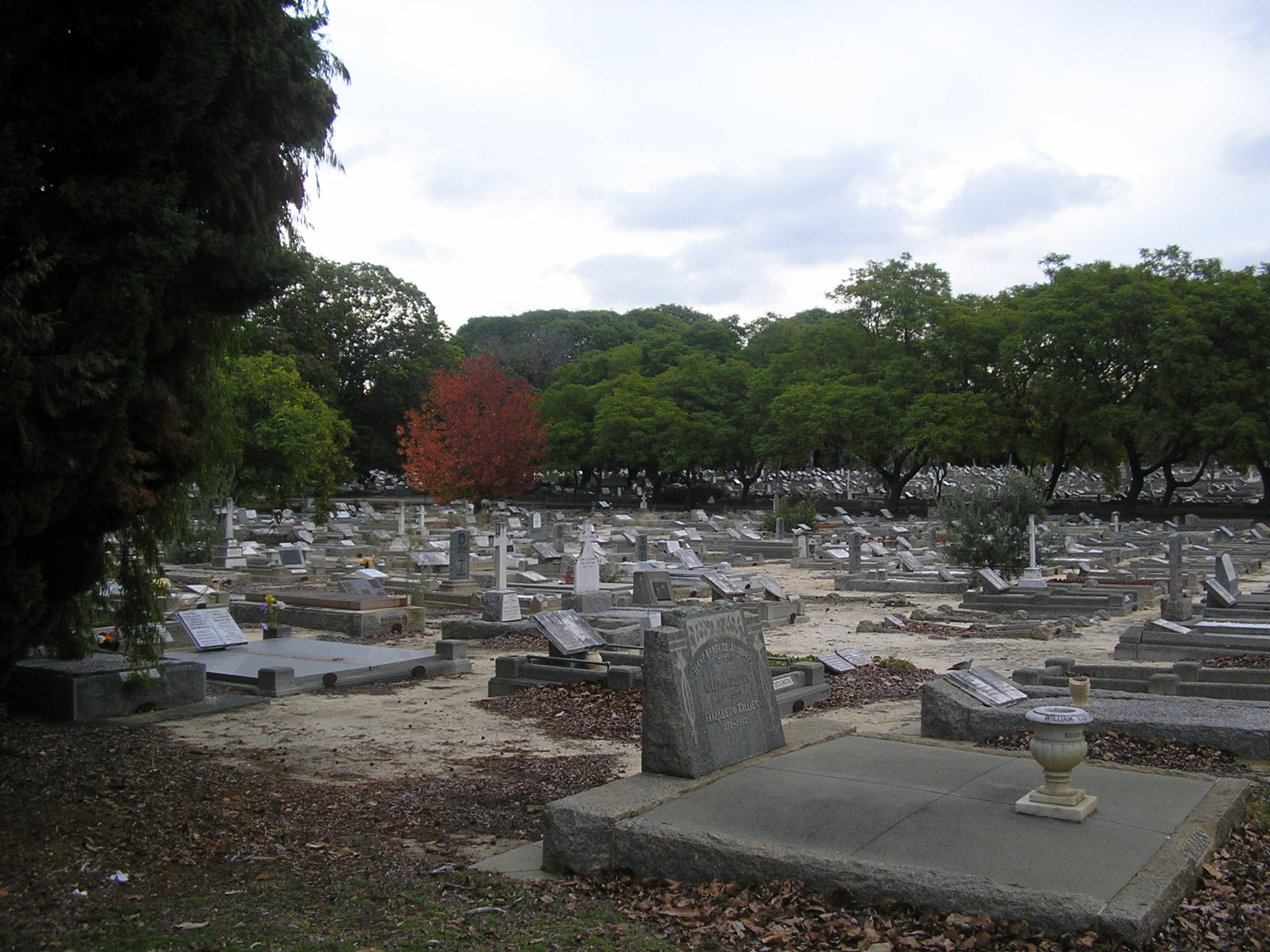
Karrakatta Cemetery in Perth, Western Australia

His health worsened again and, at the age of only 35, Iain Eairsidh MacAsgaill died of pneumonia at Perth in June 1934. He was buried under the marker 377 in Karrakatta Cemetery, in the Perth suburb of the same name.

In 1983, Dr Iain Napier MacAsgaill put a gravestone where Iain Eairdsidh was buried. At Dr. MacAsgaill's request, acclaimed bagpiper John D. Burgess visited the grave during a tour of Australia and played a lament for the deceased poet and piper.

After first reading her great-uncle's Australian poetry of homesickness during a Gaelic class held in Glasgow, Alina NicAsgaill Simpson took the initiative to repatriate MacAsgaill's remains to Berneray, Harris. Alina raised £6000 within six months and fulfilled her great-uncle's last wishes in 2010. Following a Reformed funeral in Gaelic which was attended by more than 40 relatives, MacAsgaill was laid to rest beside his parents.

In a subsequent interview with The Scotsman, Simpson revealed that the current owner of her great uncle's farm near Varley, Western Australia, Gary Struthers, had recently changed its name back to "Borvedale" in honor of the former owner of the land.

== Publications ==
- 1961. An ribheid chiùil: being the poems of Iain Archie MacAskill 1898–1933, Bard of Berneray, Harris edited by Alick Morrison (Stirling: printed for the editor by Learmonth)

== Writings about him ==
- Martin, Ruth Lee. 2013. 'Paradise Imagined: Songs of Scots Gaelic migrants in Australia, 1850–1940' ann an Humanities Research àir. XIX. No.3. 2013. dd. 27–44.

== Songs ==
- "Eilean Bheàrnaraigh".
