= Cryptandra dielsii =

Conservation status
- Priority Three — Poorly Known Taxa (DEC)

Scientific classification
- Kingdom: Plantae
- Clade: Tracheophytes
- Clade: Angiosperms
- Clade: Eudicots
- Clade: Rosids
- Order: Rosales
- Family: Rhamnaceae
- Genus: Cryptandra
- Species: C. dielsii

Binomial name
- Cryptandra dielsii Rye

Species of flowering plant

Cryptandra dielsii is a flowering plant in the family Rhamnaceae and is endemic to the south-west of Western Australia. It is a spreading shrub with linear to narrowly oblong leaves and dense clusters of white, hairy, tube-shaped flowers.

== Description ==
Cryptandra dielsii is a spreading, intricately branched shrub that typically grows to a height of 30–70 cm (12–28 in) high, its young stems densely hairy. The leaves are linear to narrowly oblong, 2–5 mm (0.079–0.197 in) long and 0.6–0.8 mm (0.024–0.031 in) wide, on a petiole bout 0.2 mm (0.0079 in) long with stipules 1.7–2.3 mm (0.067–0.091 in) long at the base. The edges of the leaves are turned down or rolled under, concealing the lower surface and there is a fine point 0.1–0.3 mm (0.0039–0.0118 in) long on the tip. The flowers are white, borne in dense clusters of 6 to 9, 4–8 mm (0.16–0.31 in) in diameter, surrounded by large involucral bracts, the individual flowers not distinct. The floral tube is 1.5–2.0 mm (0.059–0.079 in) long and densely hairy, the sepals 0.7–1.3 mm (0.028–0.051 in) long and densely hairy. Flowering occurs from July to September.

== Taxonomy and naming ==
Cryptandra dielsii was first formally described in 2007 by Barbara Lynette Rye in the journal Nuytsia from an unpublished description by Charles Gardner, of specimens he collected near Tammin in 1936. The specific epithet (dielsii ) honours Ludwig Diels.

== Distribution and habitat ==
This cryptandra mainly grows with shrubby she-oak (Allocasuarina campestris) between Manmanning, Varley and Lake King in the Avon Wheatbelt and Mallee bioregions of south-western Western Australia.

== Conservation status ==
Cryptandra dielsii is listed as "Priority Three" by the Government of Western Australia Department of Biodiversity, Conservation and Attractions, meaning that it is poorly known and known from only a few locations but is not under imminent threat.
