= Harry Watts =

Sunderland sailor and diver

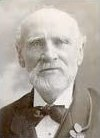
- Harry Watts – Rescuer
- Born: 15 June 1826; Sunderland, England
- Died: 26 April 1913 (aged 86); Sunderland
- Education: Left school at nine
- Occupations: Sailor and diver
- Employer: River Wear Commission
- Known for: Saving lives
- Spouse: Sarah Ann Thompson
- Children: Two
- Parent(s): William and Elizabeth Watts

Henry Watts (15 June 1826 – 26 April 1913) was a Sunderland sailor and diver, who rescued over 40 people from drowning during his lifetime – and assisted in the rescue of another 120 people.

== Early life ==
Harry Watts was born into the poverty of Sunderland’s East End. His parents, William and Elizabeth Watts, had five children, Harry being the youngest. The family lived at Silver Street, where their one room was often flooded due to a nearby well, which overflowed during heavy rain.

Harry's father, a mariner, was bed-bound for much of his childhood, while his mother died when he was just seven. At nine, Harry became the main breadwinner for the family. His first job was at the Garrison Pottery, opposite the old Quaker Meeting House, where he received a wage of one shilling and sixpence a week. He later moved to a weaving factory in Fitter's Row, but his constant hunger eventually drove him to seek work at sea, as food was plentiful for sailors.

== Life at sea ==
Watts signed up as an apprentice sailor at 14 and his first voyage was to Quebec. Just a few weeks later he made his first rescue, after a fellow apprentice fell overboard. Watts' second voyage, to the Miramichi in Canada, found him making his second rescue. This time Watts saved the life of his captain after his canoe capsized.

Details of Watts' life is documented in a book published in 1911, Harry Watts – Sailor and Diver by Alfred Spencer. Spencer records the second rescue as follows: "Harry picked up the end of a rope and jumped overboard. He swam to the captain, fastened the rope round him and helped him to the ladder which was hanging over the ship's side."

By the time Watts was 19, he had saved five people from drowning. He did not, however, receive any financial reward for his bravery. While on shore-leave, Watts married his first wife, Rebecca Smith, in 1846, before returning to the sea. The following year, he rescued six foreign seamen from a sinking ship in Rotterdam. He then returned to Sunderland to work as a rigger in the shipyards, rescuing a further five people from the River Wear between 1852 and 1853.

== Career change ==
Watts signed up as a diver with the River Wear Commissioners in 1861, a role he held until 1896. As a rescue sideline, he also joined Sunderland Lifeboat and Life Brigade services, where he assisted in saving a further 120 people. By now he was married to his second wife, Sarah Ann Thompson and had two children. He joined the Primitive Methodist Church and becoming a strict teetotaller. His job as a diver was a dangerous one. Not only did he save several more people from drowning, he also helped blast away the rocks from below Lambton Drops, to make the entrance to the river easier to navigate, provided vital aid when the mines of County Durham flooded and was part of the rescue party dealing with the Tay Bridge disaster in 1879.

The bravery Watts had shown throughout his life was finally recognised in the late 1860s, when several medals were bestowed on him. However, these were stolen in 1878, after Watts lent the collection to the James Williams Street Christian Lay Church for an exhibition at its annual bazaar. It was later discovered the thief had given them to his daughter to play with, who threw them into the fire after growing bored.

The people of Sunderland rallied round to pay for replacements, and Watts was able to wear them with pride once again, before presenting them to Sunderland Museum, where they are still on show.

Andrew Carnegie, the Scottish-born American businessman and philanthropist, once described Watts as a "the bravest man I ever met". He also said, "Compared with his acts, military glory sinks into nothing. The hero who kills men is the hero of barbarism; the hero of civilisation saves the lives of his fellows."

== Final years ==
Watts never asked for, and rarely received, any reward for his life-saving activities, and in his old age he was not well off. He was about 83 when Andrew Carnegie heard of him and, after being told of Watts' bravery, the millionaire insisted on meeting him. Carnegie admitted Watts to his Hero Fund after learning of his reduced circumstances, which provided the pensioner with a "sizeable" income of 25 shillings a week.

Carnegie met with Watts while in Sunderland to open Monkwearmouth Branch Library on 21 October 1909. The industrialist and philanthropist said afterwards: "I have today been introduced to a man who has, I think, the most ideal character of any man living on the face of the earth. You should never let the memory of this Sunderland man die."

A biography on Watts was written and published in Sunderland in 1911, at the instigation of a "committee of local admirers", called Harry Watts – Sailor and Diver, by Alfred Spencer. A small tribute to Watts can also be seen at Sunderland Museum, where several of the medals awarded to him are also held.

Watts died on 26 April 1913, at the age of 86. His diving activities were carried on by his son, and then his grandson, who was also named Harry Watts.

Author Terry Deary presented a BBC programme about Watts in 2012 and campaigned for him to be memorialised in his native Sunderland. A new biography, Harry Watts: The Forgotten Hero was published the following year.

== People saved ==
These incidents occurred in Sunderland, unless otherwise stated.

- 1839: Richard Nicholson, a fellow apprentice, who fell overboard in Quebec.
- 1840: J. Luckley, the captain of his ship, after a canoe capsized at Miramichi.
- 1844: A lad named Watson, who was washed overboard on the Pentland Firth.
- 1845: Two men rescued from a sinking barge at Woolwich, London.
- 1847: Six men pulled from a smashed ship in Rotterdam.
- 1852: A boy named Paul, saved from drowning at Sunderland's South Pier.
- 1852: A boy named Maughan, pulled from the river at Smurthwaite's Wharf.
- 1853: Saved a woman from committing suicide at Hendon beach.
- 1853: Rescued a girl who had fallen into a canal in Cardiff.
- 1853: Pulled a trimmer, William Smith, to safety from Sunderland dock.
- 1854: Saved a boy at Wapping Dock. The polluted water almost killed Watts.
- No date: Jumped overboard to save two boys from drowning at the South Outlet.
- 1863: Rescued a boy and girl after they fell from, the quay near Panns Ferry.
- 1866: A boy called Smith was saved from Graving Dock after falling from a dredger.
- 1866: A boy called Hall saved from The River Wear Commissioners’ Quay.
- 1867: An unnamed boy rescued from the river at the Custom House Quay.
- 1868: John Fox from Mill Street saved after falling from a boat into the Mark Quay.
- 1869: James Watt, a shipwright, saved from the South Dock basin after falling in.
- 1870: Watts helped save eight children and three adults from a capsized pleasure boat. On the same day, he also rescued a man called Robert Wilson from the river.
- 1870: A boy who fallen into the river near the Tide Gauge Jetty.
- 1875: Watts almost drowned rescuing schoolboy Edward Boulton from the river.
- 1876: A boy called Harry Dobson was saved from the river.
- 1877: Watts saved John Lonsdale, dragged overboard from a keel by a heavy chain.
- 1881: Jumped into the Graving Dock to rescue a lad named Jones, who was drowning.
- 1884: Rescued a boy called James Riseborough, who had fallen into the outer basin.
- 1892: At the age of 66, Watts made his last rescue – going to the aid of a boy called Fatherley, who had fallen into the South Dock.

== Medals and certificates ==
- A bronze medal and Honorary Clasp of the Royal Humane Society
- A gold and bronze medal from Diamond Swimming Club and Humane Society.
- A gold medal presented by Mr Richardson, for "searching the River Wear and recovering the body of his grandson", 1875.
- A silver medal presented by the Sailors of the East End of Sunderland in 1877 for his many kind services.
- A gold medal from the United Temperance Crusaders for his courage in saving 33 people from drowning, 1875.
- A silver star medal – presented to mark his rescue of 'many people' in 1878.
- A bronze medal from the Board of Trade for 'saving lives from drowning on various occasions' in 1877.
- A parchment certificate from the Royal Humane Society in 1866.
- A certificate from the Diamond Swimming Club and Humane Society in 1868 for "saving the life of a boy in the River Wear, he having previously saved 24 lives".
- An Honorary Testimonial of the Royal Humane Society for saving the life of Harry Watt in July 1869.
- A Vellum Certificate of the Royal Humane Society, for saving the life of Edward Bolton in August 1875.
- A certificate from the Royal Humane Society for saving lives, presented in 1892.
