= Burnside, Western Australia =

Burnside
- Town
- Coordinates: 33°56′13″S 115°1′5″E
- Country: Australia
- State: Western Australia
- LGA(s): Shire of Augusta-Margaret River

Government
  - State electorate(s): Warren-Blackwood
  - Federal division(s): Forrest

Area
  - Total: 19.5 km^{2} (7.5 sq mi)

Population
  - Total(s): 309 (SAL 2021)
- Postcode: 6284

Burnside is a small townsite located in the South West region of Western Australia in the Shire of Augusta-Margaret River. In 2021, the new locality of Yebble was created from non-residential parts of Burnside and Gracetown.
