= Redgate, Western Australia =

Redgate
- Suburb
- Interactive map of Redgate
- Coordinates: 34°1′38″S 115°1′42″E
- Country: Australia
- State: Western Australia
- LGA: Shire of Augusta-Margaret River
- Location: 289 km (180 mi) SW of Perth; 10 km (6.2 mi) SW of Margaret River

Government
  - State electorate: Warren-Blackwood
  - Federal division: Forrest

Area
  - Total: 23.6 km^{2} (9.1 sq mi)

Population
  - Total: 98 (SAL 2021)
- Postcode: 6286

Redgate is a small locality located in the South West region of Western Australia in the Shire of Augusta-Margaret River. It contains Redgate Beach, the site of the shipwreck of the SS Georgette, along with Calgardup Beach and Calgardup Bay.
