= Sam Isaacs =

Australian stockman and farmer involved in ship rescue

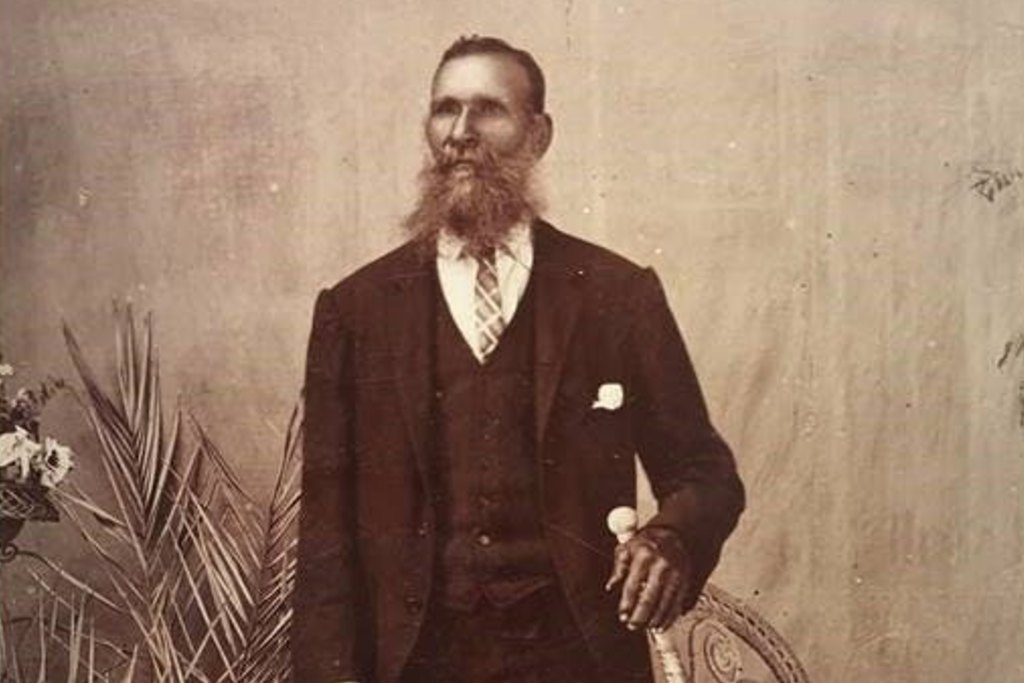
- Awards: Royal Humane Society (bravery and selfless courage in the Georgette rescue, 1876)

Samuel Yebble Isaacs (1845 – 14 July 1920) was an Aboriginal Australian stockman and farmer from the South West region of Western Australia, who was best known for his role in the rescue of SS Georgette in 1876, together with Grace Bussell.

== Biography ==
Isaacs was born in 1845 in Augusta to Saul "Sam" Isaacs, a Native-American or African-American sailor who came to the Busselton area on an American whaling ship in the 1830s, and Darinder, a Wardandi woman who gave him the Aboriginal name Yebble. She died during childbirth and he was fostered by Anne Dawson, who had recently given birth to a son, Elijah. The two children were raised with the Dawsons on their farming property, Westbrook. He worked for white settlers from an early age and around 1860, at the age of about fifteen, he was taken in by the Bussell family at the Ellensbrook homestead, after a reputed incident when he was droving pigs for John Molloy but lost the animals in the bush. He moved with the Bussells to the newly built Wallcliffe House and then began working for them as a stockman. Although he was illiterate, he was renowned for his skill in working with cattle and his expertise in horsemanship and handling the teams of bullocks used to transport heavy loads and timber.

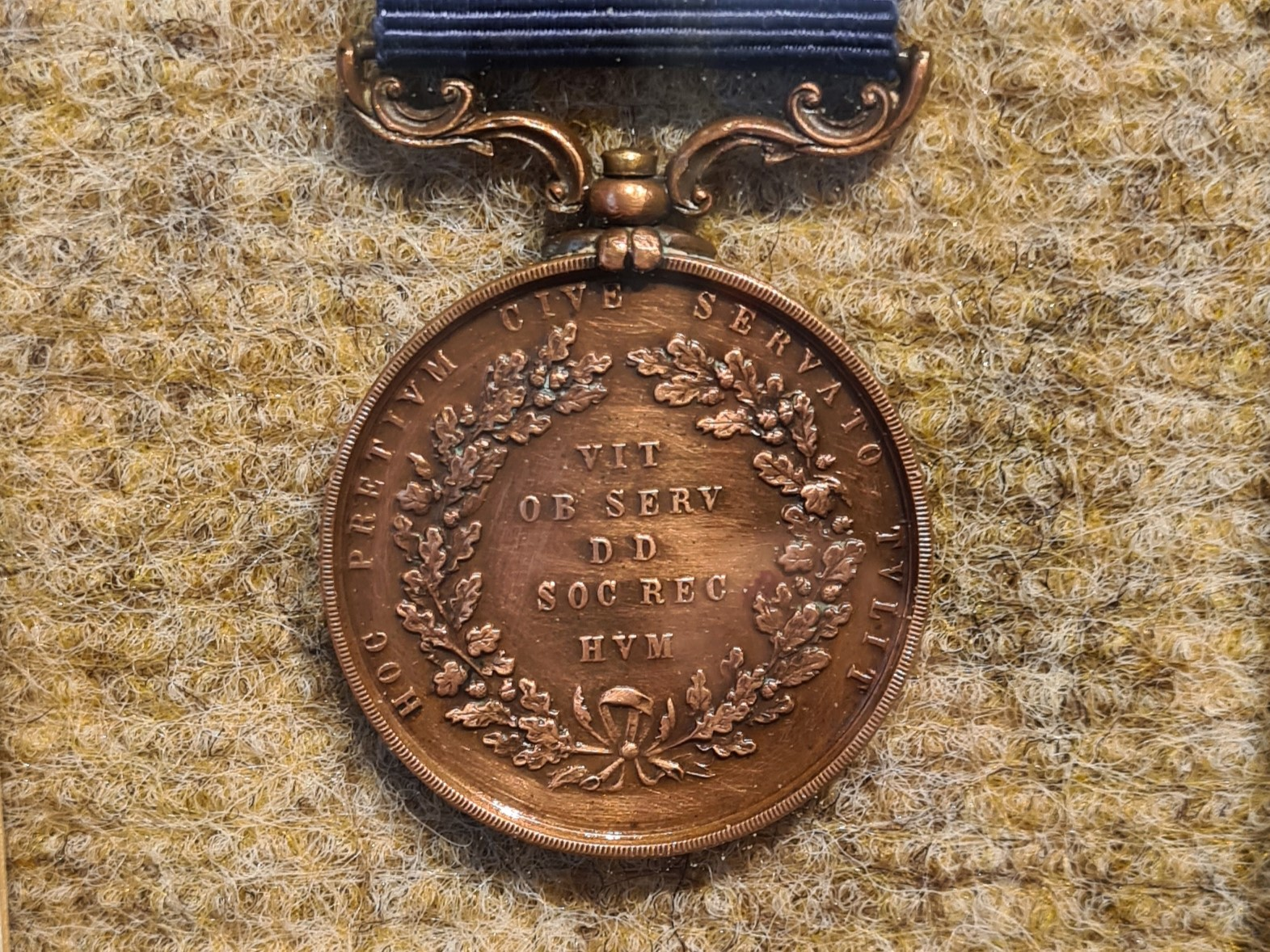
Bronze medal

On 1 December 1876, while searching for cattle in the hills near the Bussell homestead, Isaacs noticed that a ship, SS Georgette, was in distress and travelled the 20 kilometres (12 mi) back to the homestead to raise the alarm. Grace Bussell, then aged 16, accompanied Isaacs on the return journey on horseback, and they both took their horses down the cliffs into the water to rescue the passengers. According to an account by a family friend of Isaacs, he then returned to the water with his horse several times but Bussell went back to the beach, having been advised to do so by Isaacs because he felt she could not sufficiently control her horse. The pair rescued about fifty passengers in four hours, then took them to the Bussells' homestead to recover. While Bussell was awarded a silver medal for bravery by the Royal Humane Society, Isaacs received a bronze medal and was referred to in contemporary reports as "Grace's black servant". The Western Australian government waived remaining payments on a lease of 100 acres (40 ha) of land in the area at Sussex Location 243, allowing Isaacs to own the land, which was named Ferndale, making him the first Aboriginal person to receive a Freehold Crown Grant of land in Western Australia under Clause 12 of the Land Regulations of 1887. The land was subdivided by George Brown Milne, Town Clerk of Busselton, as the administrator of his estate into 3 separate land parcels to each of his sons, Henry Isaacs, Frederick Augustus Isaacs and Samuel Isaacs (jnr) who all later sold the land in 1936.

In January 1867, Isaacs married Lucy (Major) Lowe, an African-American who had arrived from the US on a whaling ship; the couple had six children. He died on 14 July 1920 after sustaining a fall from his horse sulky near 19 mile well (in the district now known as Metricup). He was returning home from Busselton Train Station, where he had dropped off his son Henry, who was about to join the 10th Light Horse Regiment. He is buried in the Church of England section of the Busselton Pioneer Cemetery.

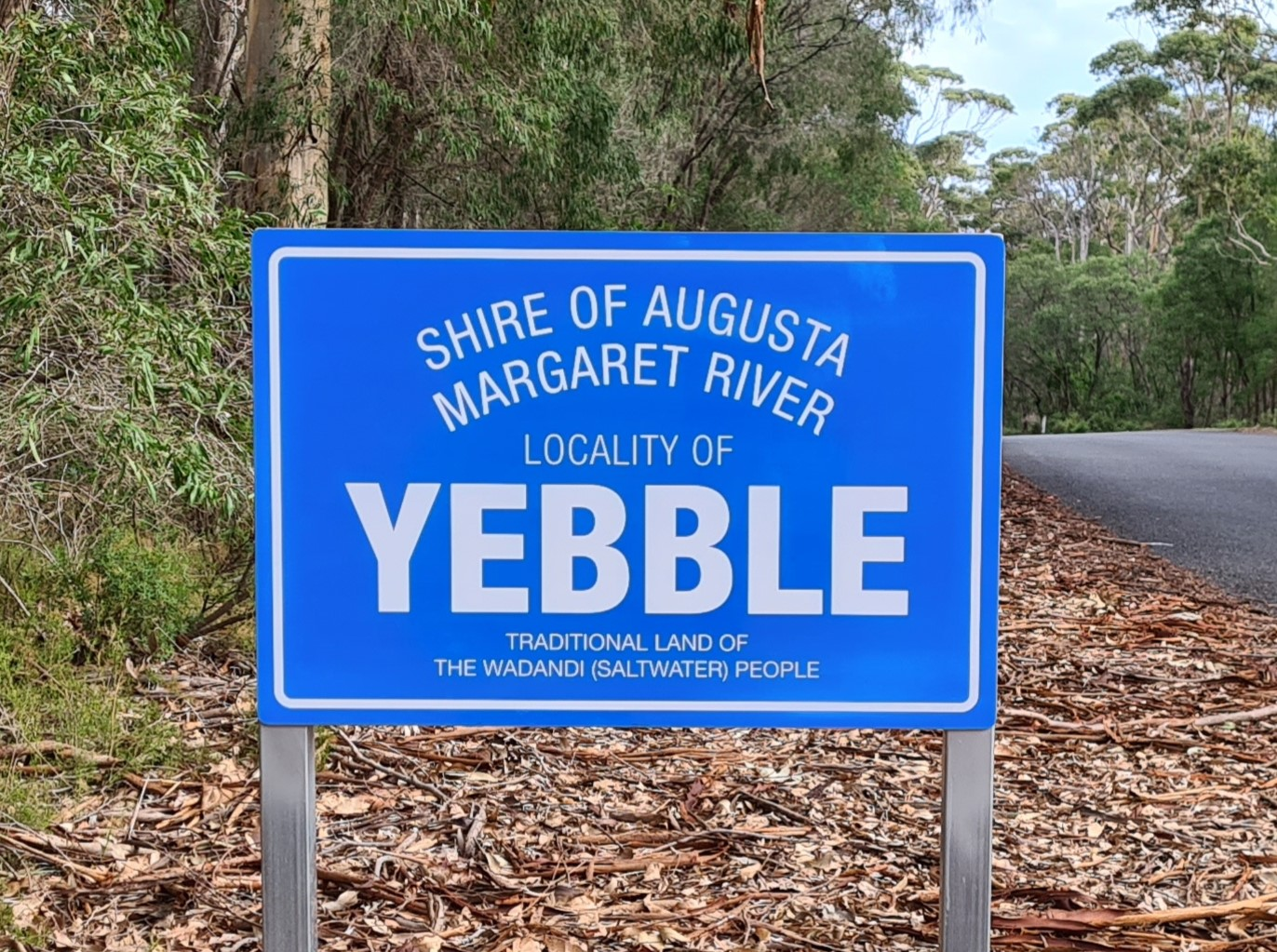
Yebble

== Legacy ==
In 2021, a new locality near the land that Isaacs was granted, Yebble, was created and named in his honour. Isaacs Road in Margaret River, Isaacs Street in Busselton, Yebble Drive in Vasse and Isaacs Rock (220 metres [720 ft]) off the coast near the mouth of Calgardup Brook are also named for him; other commemorations in the South West area include memorial plaques and a mural.
