= Alfred Bussell =

Australian politician

Alfred Pickmore Bussell
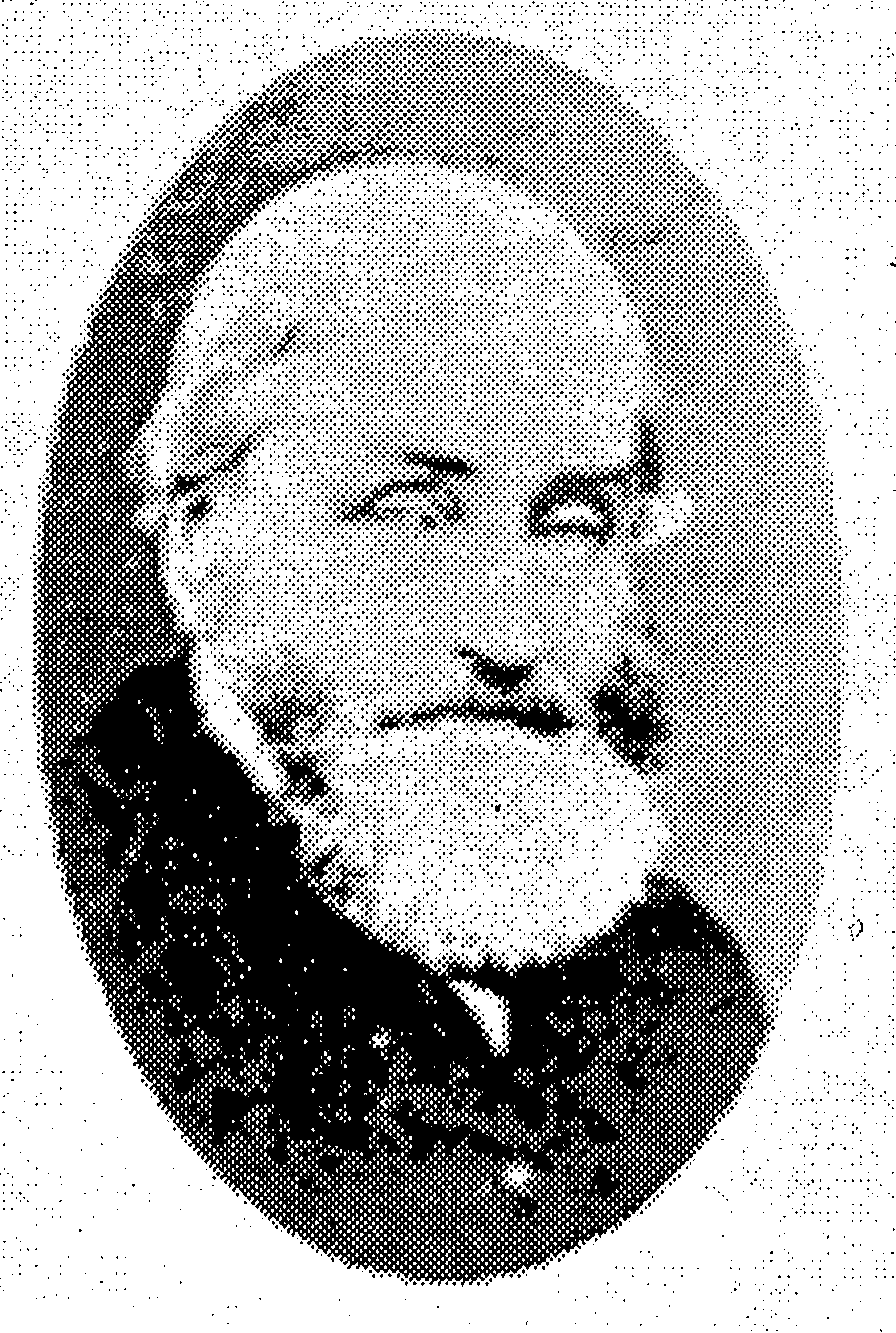
- Born: June 21, 1814; Portsea, Portsmouth, England
- Died: October 18, 1882 (aged 68); Bridgetown, Western Australia, Australia
- Spouse: Ellen Heppingstone (m.1850–77; her death)
- Children: 7 (including Grace Bussell)

Alfred Pickmore Bussell (21 June 1814 – 18 October 1882) was an early settler in Western Australia.

Bussell was born at Portsea, Portsmouth, Hampshire in England on 21 June 1814. He was educated at Winchester College in England, but after the death of his father the family emigrated to Western Australia. Bussell and three of his brothers sailed for Western Australia on board Warrior in March 1830, with the rest of the Bussell family to follow once the brothers were established. He was fifteen years old at the time.

On arriving at the Swan River Colony, the Bussells were advised to start a new sub-colony at Augusta. For four years the brothers tried unsuccessfully to establish a farm, initially at Augusta and then further up the Blackwood River. The brothers had immense difficulty clearing the land, and found the soil not particularly good for farming. John Bussell conducted a number of exploring expeditions to the Vasse (later known as Busselton) in search of better land, with Alfred accompanying him on at least two expeditions. The explorers found excellent farmland at the Vasse, so after the Bussells' home was destroyed by fire in 1834, the family re-established themselves at the Vasse, where they became successful and prosperous farmers.

During the early years of their settlement in the Vasse area the Bussell family, including Alfred, were involved in three massacres of Wardandi Noongar people. On 27 June 1837 the first massacre occurred after the disappearance of a calf belonging to their neighbours, the Chapmans. Alfred Bussell went with the two Chapmans, soldiers from the 21st Regiment and Constable Dawson to a place called Yulijoogarup. There the settler group shot and killed nine Wardandi people and wounded two others, including women and children.

The second massacre occurred in July 1837. On 13 July Dawson was speared in the arm by a Wardandi warrior in retaliation for the first massacre. The Bussell brothers Charles, Lennox and Alfred then got together with the Chapmans and took various steps to retaliate. On 30 July shouting was heard down at the estuary, and the settler men armed themselves, went to the estuary and shot and killed at least six people.

In February 1841 Alfred was involved in the Wonnerup Massacre with his brothers after George Layman was killed by Wardandi warrior Gayware. According to the History of West Australia, "the white men had no mercy" and dozens of Noongar people were killed.

In 1850, Bussell married Ellen Heppingstone, and the following year they moved to Broadwater in what is now West Busselton. In 1857 they moved to Ellensbrook near the Margaret River, and in 1865 they also took up "Wallcliffe", resulting in land holdings that stretched from Cowaramup to the Donnelly River. From 29 July 1872 until 30 June 1874, Bussell was a nominee Member of the Western Australian Legislative Council. His wife died in 1877, and he followed in 1882. They had six sons and eight daughters.
