= Grace Bussell =

Western Australian heroine

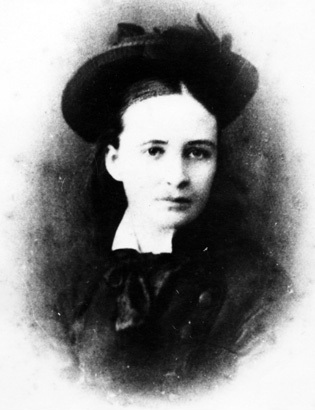
- Born: 23 September 1860 near Margaret River, Western Australia, Australia
- Died: 7 October 1935 (aged 75); Guildford, Western Australia, Australia
- Resting place: Guildford Cemetery
- Other name: Grace Vernon Drake-Brockman
- Spouse: Frederick Slade Drake-Brockman (m.1880–1917; his death)
- Children: 7, including Edmund and Deborah
- Parent(s): Ellen (née Heppingstone) and Alfred Pickmore Bussell
- Relatives: John Bussell (uncle), John Winthrop Hackett (son-in-law)
- Awards: Royal Humane Society Silver Medal

Grace Vernon Drake-Brockman (née Bussell; 23 September 1860 – 7 October 1935), commonly referred to as Grace Bussell, was a woman from Western Australia. In 1876, as a 16-year-old, she was involved with Sam Isaacs in the rescue of SS Georgette, for which she was awarded the Royal Humane Society's Silver Medal.

== Biography ==
Bussell was born to the well-known and prosperous Bussell family. At age 7, she discovered Wallcliffe cave.

Lauded by the press at the time of the rescue (in which Aboriginal stockman Sam Isaacs was also involved), she became known as 'The Grace Darling of the West', (after an Englishwoman who had rescued people in similar circumstances). She was awarded a silver medal by the Royal Humane Society, and also a gold watch and chain by the British Government.

According to an account in the local Inquirer and Commercial News,

the boat swamped, they were all in the water, and in the greatest danger, when, on the top of the steep cliff appeared a young lady on horseback. Those who were present have told me that they did not think that a horse could come down that cliff, but down that dangerous place this young lady rode at speed; there were lives to be saved, and, with the same fearless and chivalrous bravery that urged Grace Darling to peril her life for fellow creations, and gave her a name in all English history thereafter, Grace Bussell rode down that cliff, urged her horse into boiling surf, and out beyond the second line of roaring breakers, till she reached the boat where the women and children were in such peril. Her horse stumbled over the rope and she was nearly lost, but managed to get alongside the boat, and then with as many women and children clinging to her and the horse as possible, she made for the shore and landed them. A man was left on the boat, and he could not get to shore till Miss Bussell sent her black servant on horseback to aid him. So furious was the surf that it took four hours to land 50 people, and every boat engaged was capsized.

According to an account by Isaacs' friend, as recounted by the friend's grandson:

she went into the water only once. She rode her horse into the water and Sam had to tell her to be careful; that if she rode her horse in the way she was going, she would kill people or trample them under and drown them. He told her to turn her horse around and swim back. There was a woman and a child who grabbed the horse's tail and the horse towed them ashore. But Sam went in and out several times. By the time he got back with Grace, one man had got ashore and he'd got a rope lifeline from the ships mast and fastened it to the shore and soon there were three or four men ashore. It was a great feat for a girl of 16 but she was later given credit for almost the entire rescue.

She married Frederick Slade Drake-Brockman (1857–1917) in 1880; he served as Surveyor General of Western Australia from 1915 to 1917. They had three daughters and four sons, including Edmund (1884–1949), Geoffrey (1885–1977), and Deborah (1887–1965).

She died aged 75 in Guildford, Western Australia.

== Legacy ==
Bussell is commemorated by several places named in her honour. One of these is the coastal hamlet of Gracetown, Western Australia, north of Margaret River. Another is the Western Australian wheatbelt town of Lake Grace. Both of these were named after her by her husband. Additionally, Bussell Crescent in the Canberra suburb of Cook is named after her.
