= SS Georgette =

Shipwreck in Western Australia

Coordinates: 34°01′59″S 114°59′24″E

- SS Georgette

History
- Launched: 1872
- Fate: Sank 1876

General characteristics
- Tonnage: 337 GRT; 211 NRT
- Length: 46.2 m (152 ft)
- Beam: 6.9 m (23 ft)
- Draft: 3.4 m (11 ft)
- Propulsion: Two steam engines, 48 horsepower; Two masts, schooner rig

SS Georgette was a steamship built in 1872. She is best known, especially in Irish-American circles, for the part played in the story of the Catalpa rescue in April 1876. While the events surrounding her shipwrecking eight months later are dramatic and captured the imagination of the local press, the ship itself had little effect on coastal trade. Though heralding the way forward in the change from sail to steam on the long Western Australian coast, like its predecessor SS Xantho, Georgette had a short and ill-starred career and sank soon after its arrival there.

== History ==
Georgette was built in 1872 at Dumbarton. She was a 337-register-ton iron screw-steamer, 46.2 metres (152 ft) long, 6.9 metres (23 ft) wide and 3.4 metres (11 ft) deep. Intended as a collier, she had a capacity of 460 tons deadweight, and her two engines produced 48 horsepower. She also carried two masts with a schooner rig.

While still nearly new, Georgette was sold in England to Western Australian buyers for £14,000. She arrived at Fremantle, Western Australia in September 1873, and was put to work as a coastal trading and passenger service between Fremantle, Albany and Champion Bay. In October 1873, she was stranded on the Murray Reef, and had to be sent to Adelaide for an overhaul. She resumed service in March 1874.

=== Catalpa incident ===
In April 1876, the American whaling barque Catalpa rescued a group of Fenian political prisoners from Fremantle. Catalpa had dropped anchor in international waters, and despatched a whaleboat to shore to collect the escapees. The escape was detected while the escapees were still rowing back to Catalpa, and Georgette, which was in Fremantle at the time, was sent with a water police cutter to intercept them. However the prisoners successfully reached Catalpa and, having no official orders to board Catalpa, Georgette and the police cutter withdrew. The following morning, Georgette returned and demanded the return of the prisoners. Catalpa's captain, George Anthony, denied that he had the prisoners on board, and pointed out that he was in international waters. Georgette then fired a warning shot with its 12-pounder (5 kg) cannon, but Anthony pointed at his ship's US flag and sailed away. Georgette pursued until it was low on fuel, then returned to Fremantle.

=== Loss ===
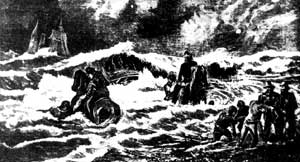
Rescue of SS Georgette's passengers and crew (Illustrated Sydney News, 3 February 1877)

On 29 November 1876, Georgette left Fremantle on what would be her last voyage. She was carrying fifty passengers and a cargo of jarrah, and was bound for Adelaide via Bunbury, Busselton and Albany. Shortly after midnight on 1 December, when Georgette was about midway between Cape Naturaliste and Cape Hamelin, a leak developed, and the ship's pumps would not work. By 4 am, the water was rising so fast that her Captain, John Godfrey, had all the passengers and crew bailing with buckets while he steered for the coast. At 6 pm the rising water extinguished the engine's fires, leaving Georgette drifting still some kilometres from shore. Godfrey then gave the orders to man the lifeboats, but the first lifeboat to be lowered was thrown against the ship's side by a big wave, and snapped in half. Some of the occupants were rescued by a second lifeboat, but twelve people died.

Georgette continued to drift until she drifted into the surf at Calgardup Bay, where she was seen by the Bussell family's Aboriginal stockman, Sam Isaacs. Isaacs travelled to the Bussell homestead to raise the alarm, where Alfred Bussell gave him some ropes and gear for the rescue. His 16-year-old daughter Grace insisted on accompanying Isaacs on the return trip to the scene on horseback. Meanwhile, Georgette had grounded and begun to break up. On arriving at the scene, Grace Bussell immediately rode down the cliffs and into the surf, swimming her horse out until it was alongside one of the swamped lifeboats. With as many people as possible clinging to her and her horse, she returned to shore and landed them. One man was left on the boat, and Isaacs was sent to collect him. Godfrey continued to launch lifeboats, but every one was swamped or capsized in the surf. Bussell and Isaacs continued their rescuing efforts, taking over four hours to land all the passengers. According to an account by a family friend of Isaacs, he returned to the water with his horse several times but Bussell went back to the beach, having been advised to do so by Isaacs because he felt she could not sufficiently control her horse.

Grace Bussell's role in the rescue was widely and enthusiastically reported, with newspapers around the world picking up the story. Bussell was touted as "Western Australia's Grace Darling", and was awarded the Royal Humane Society's silver medal. Isaacs received a bronze and was granted 40 hectares (100 acres) of land by the Government of Western Australia, becoming the first Aboriginal person to receive a land grant in Western Australia. Godfrey, on the other hand, received much of the blame for the shipwreck. He was found not guilty on five counts of negligence, but his captain's certificate was still revoked. Godfrey managed to somehow regain his certificate in the two years following the sinking and became captain of the brig Laughing Wave. He committed suicide before daylight on 3 May 1882, by jumping overboard when the brig was off the North West Cape.

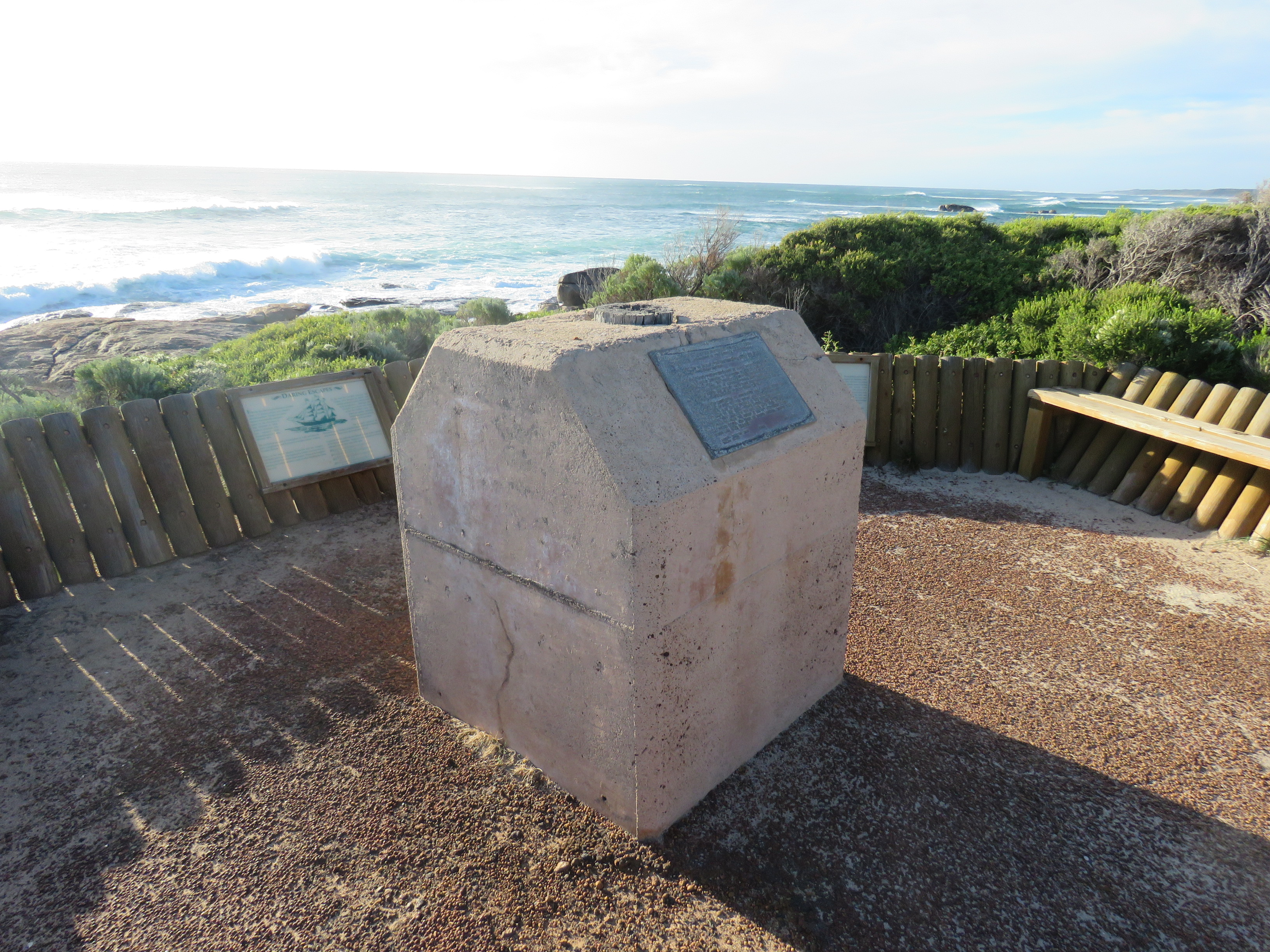
The SS Georgette memorial at Redgate Beach

Georgette's hull was sold for £40. Today the wreck lies in 5 metres (16 ft) of water, about 90 metres (300 ft) off Redgate Beach. The site is protected under the Historic Shipwrecks Act 1976.

One of the survivors of the sinking was future Western Australian premier George Leake.

== General references ==
- The Western Australian Times . 21 April 1876 – via Wikisource.
- The Western Australian Times . 5 December 1876 – via Wikisource.
- The Western Australian Times . 12 December 1876 – via Wikisource.
