= Calgardup Bay =

Bay in Western Australia

Coordinates: 34°1′47″S 114°59′27″E

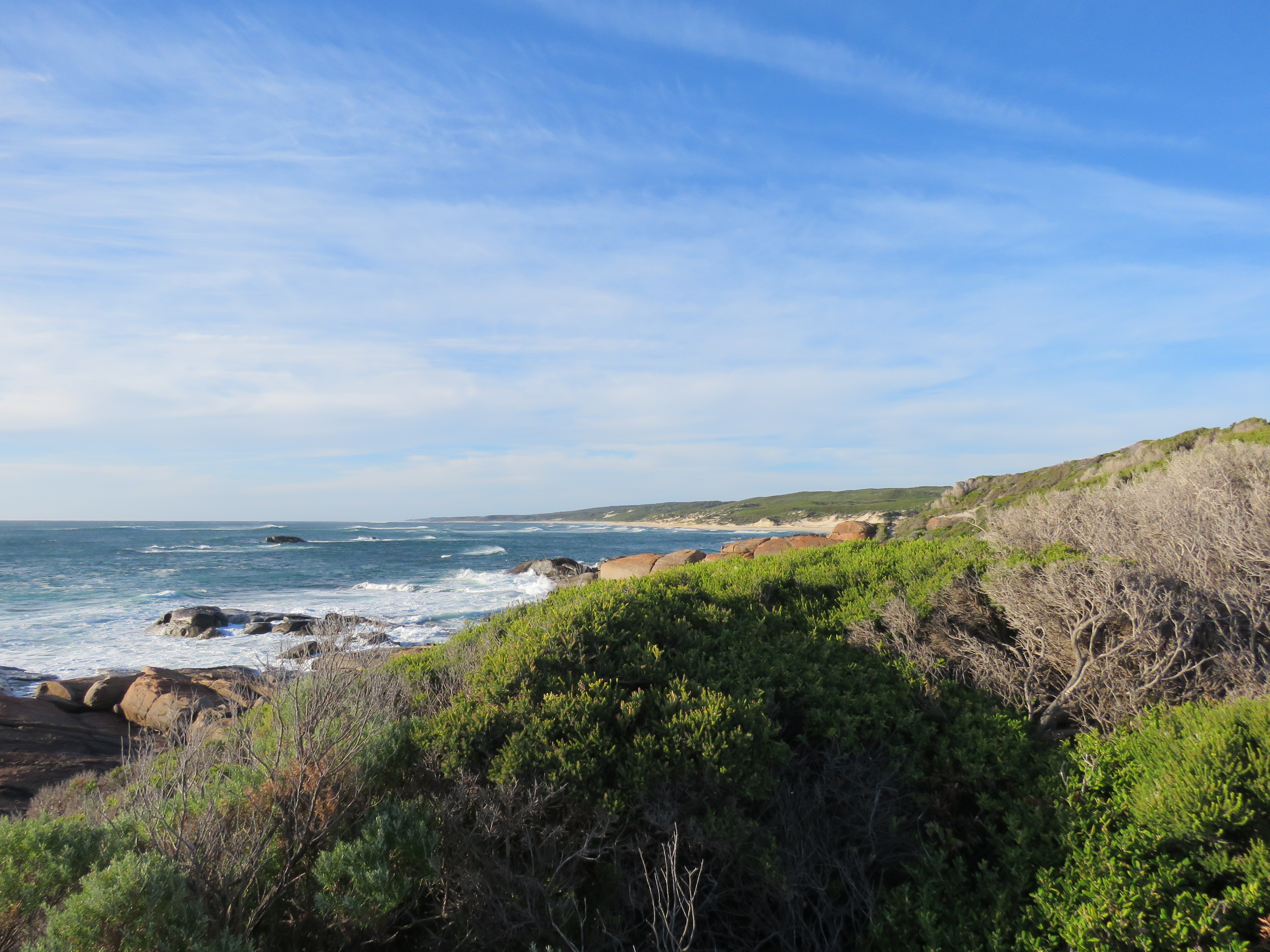
Calgardup Bay seen from the south

Calgardup Bay is located in the Australian state of Western Australia, 10 km south-west of the town of Margaret River. The tourist resort of Prevelly is located at the northern end of the bay.

In 1876, the SS Georgette was wrecked in Calgardup Bay and an outline of rusting remains of the hull can still be seen off Redgate beach.

It is located in an area between Capes Naturaliste and Leeuwin—where most points and bays have suitable conditions for surfing.

== See also ==
- Surfing locations in the Capes region of South West Western Australia
