= Royal Humane Society =

British charity organization

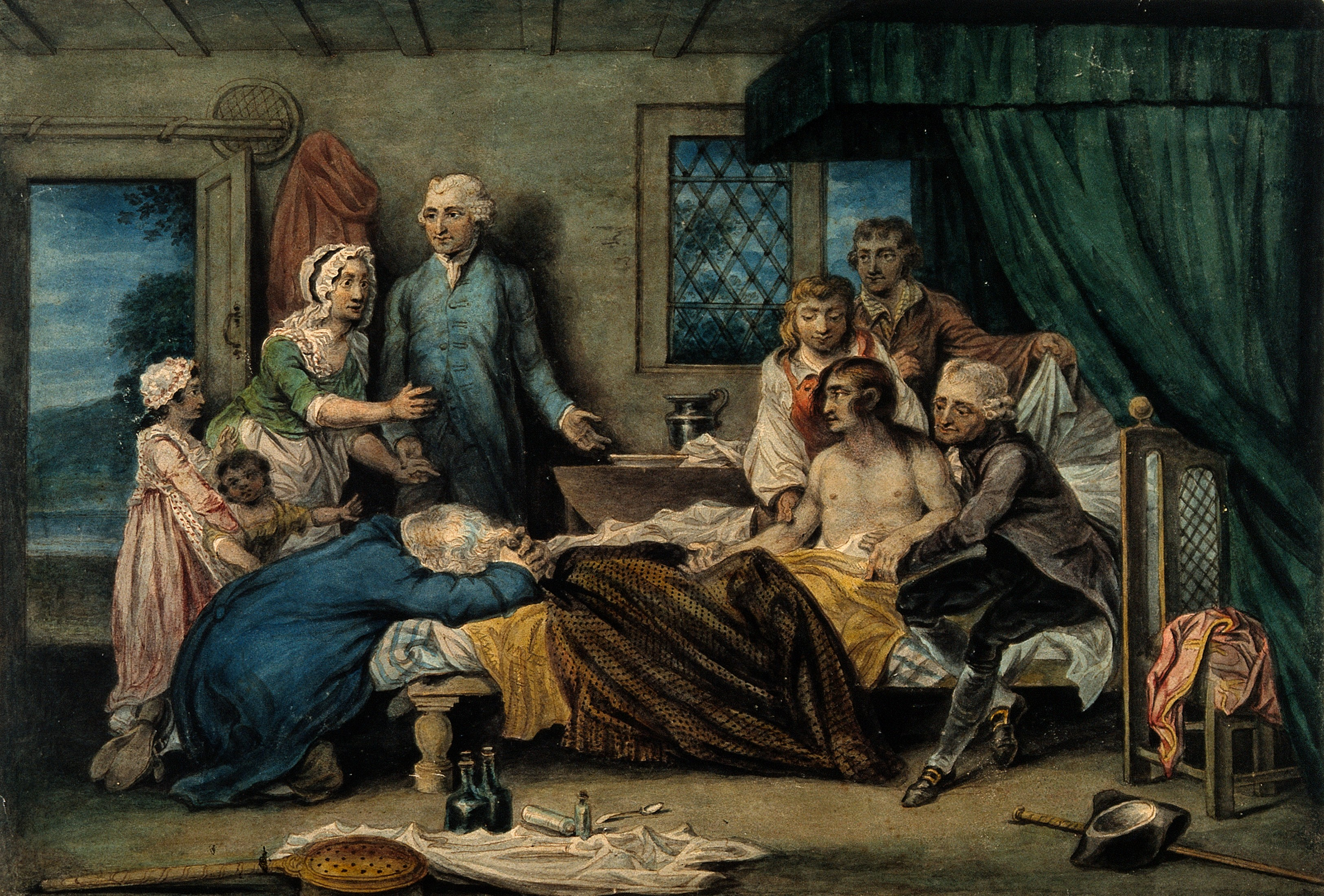
A man recuperating from near-drowning at a receiving-house of the Royal Humane Society, 18th century

The Royal Humane Society is a British charity which promotes lifesaving intervention. It was founded in 1774 as the Society for the Recovery of Persons Apparently Drowned, for the purpose of rendering first aid in cases of near drowning.

== History ==
In 1773, physician William Hawes (1736–1808) began publicising the power of artificial respiration and tobacco smoke enemas to resuscitate people who superficially appeared to have drowned. For a year he paid a reward out of his own pocket to any one bringing him a body rescued from the water within a reasonable time of immersion. Thomas Cogan, a fellow physician, who had become interested in the same subject during a stay at Amsterdam, where was instituted in 1767 a society for preservation of life from accidents in water, joined Hawes in his crusade. In the summer of 1774 Hawes and Cogan each brought fifteen friends to a meeting at the Chapter Coffee-house, St Paul's Churchyard, when the Royal Humane Society was founded.

Gradually, branches of the Royal Humane Society were set up in other parts of the country, mainly in ports and coastal towns where the risk of drowning was high and by the end of the 19th century the society had upwards of 280 depots throughout the United Kingdom, supplied with life-saving apparatus. The earliest of these depots was the Receiving House in Hyde Park, on the north bank of the Serpentine, which was built in 1794 on a site granted by George III. Hyde Park was chosen because tens of thousands of people swam in the Serpentine in the summer and ice-skated in the winter. Boats and boatmen were kept to render aid to bathers, and in the winter ice-men were sent round to the different skating grounds in and around London. The society distributed money-rewards, medals, clasps and testimonials, to those who save or attempt to save drowning people. It further recognised "all cases of exceptional bravery in rescuing or attempting to rescue persons from asphyxia in mines, wells, blasting furnaces, or in sewers where foul gas may endanger life."

The Royal Humane Society established commonwealth branches in Australia in 1874, in Canada in 1894, and in New Zealand in 1898.

== Present activity ==
The society is now a registered charity whose motto is lateat scintillula forsan, "a small spark may perhaps lie hid." The Society's president is Princess Alexandra of Kent.

Since its foundation, the Royal Humane Society has made more than 85,000 awards. Financial rewards are no longer given, nor does the society give advice on how to save life; however, the awards granted include bronze, silver and gold medals and Testimonials on Vellum or Parchment. The Society may also recognise those who have contributed to the saving or attempted saving of life, though they may not have put their own life at risk. In these instances, a Certificate of Commendation may be granted. In addition, Resuscitation Certificates may be granted to those who, though not professionally trained to do so, carry out a successful resuscitation.

== Medals and awards ==
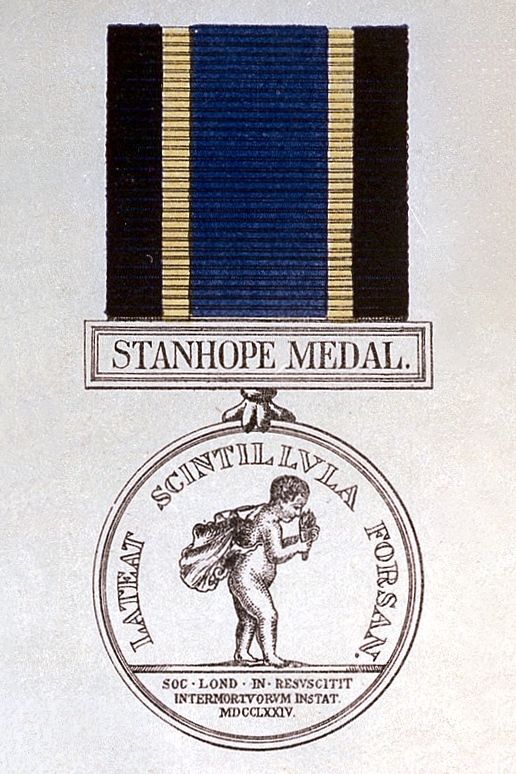
Stanhope Medal, showing the old toe-claw mount, later replaced with the swivelling ornamental suspender.

Between 1776 and 1998, approximately 135 gold, 1,336 silver and 11,230 bronze honorary medals were awarded by the Society. Current awards are divided into two classes of medal, and certificates / testimonials.

=== Medals ===
- Stanhope Medal: introduced in 1873 and named in memory of naval officer Chandos Scudamore Scudamore Stanhope, and awarded annually for the most gallant rescue to have been rewarded by the Society. It is made of 9 carat gold.
- Silver Medal: the Society's oldest award, being introduced in 1775. This medal is awarded to those who have put their own lives at risk to save the life of another; however to a further extent than what would qualify for the bronze medal. This includes, extreme personal danger, a long and arduous rescue, and returning to a dangerous situation.
- Bronze Medal: introduced in 1837, this medal is awarded to those who have put their own lives at risk to save the life of another.
- Police Medal: introduced in 2000, this medal is awarded only once per year, to honour the most outstanding act of heroism by a police officer from the United Kingdom.

Although not official awards, the medals are permitted to be worn on the right chest in uniform by members of the British armed forces and civilian services.

=== Certificates and Testimonials ===
- President's Award: awarded to a young person (less than 18 years old at the time of the incident) who has received an award from the Society, and whose life saving act is considered the most meritorious for the year.
- Testimonial on Vellum: awarded when someone has put themselves in considerable danger to save, or attempt to save, the life of another. This award is no longer made from vellum, instead from card.
- Testimonial on Parchment: awarded where someone has put themselves in danger to save, or attempt to save, someone else. This award is no longer made from parchment, instead from card.
- In Memoriam Testimonials: awarded to the next of kin of a person who has died while attempting to save the life of another.
- Certificate of Commendation: awarded to those who have made a contribution toward saving, or attempting to save, the life of another, while not necessarily putting themselves at risk.
- Resuscitation Certificate: awarded to people who have effected a successful resuscitation of someone, who was at one stage 'seemingly dead', through mouth-to-mouth resuscitation (MMR) and/or heart-and-lung massage (CPR). This award is not given to medically trained medical staff (i.e. doctors, nurses, paramedics) or in cases where resuscitation fails.

=== Awards no longer instituted ===
- The Large Medal, which was two inches in diameter, in gold, silver or bronze, which was initially awarded for gallantry in saving life and for the successful resuscitation of those apparently dead as a result of drowning or asphyxiation.
- The Small Medal was one and a half inches in diameter version, which replaced the above and was more suited to being worn on the chest.
- The Fothergillian Medal, which was the result of a £500 bequest by Anthony Fothergill, the interest on which was to be used to provide a medal to be presented annually or biennially to the author of the best essay on the prevention of shipwreck, the preservation of mariners, or other circumstances left to the Society's discretion.

=== Notable recipients ===
- Edwin Alderson (Bronze Medal)
- Colin Albert Murdoch (Bronze Medal)
- Alexander I of Russia
- Isambard Kingdom Brunel
- Grace Darling
- Edward Haughton (Bronze Medal)
- Captain George William Manby (Silver Medal)
- Bram Stoker
- Matthew Webb (first Stanhope Medal).
- Sir Edward Davey
- David Hempleman-Adams
- Duncan Goodhew.
- Septimus Ridsdale
- Sam Isaacs (Bronze Medal)

== See also ==
- Harry Watts – Rescuer awarded numerous certificates from the society
- A Distinguished Member of the Humane Society
