= Prevelly, Western Australia =

Prevelly
- Town
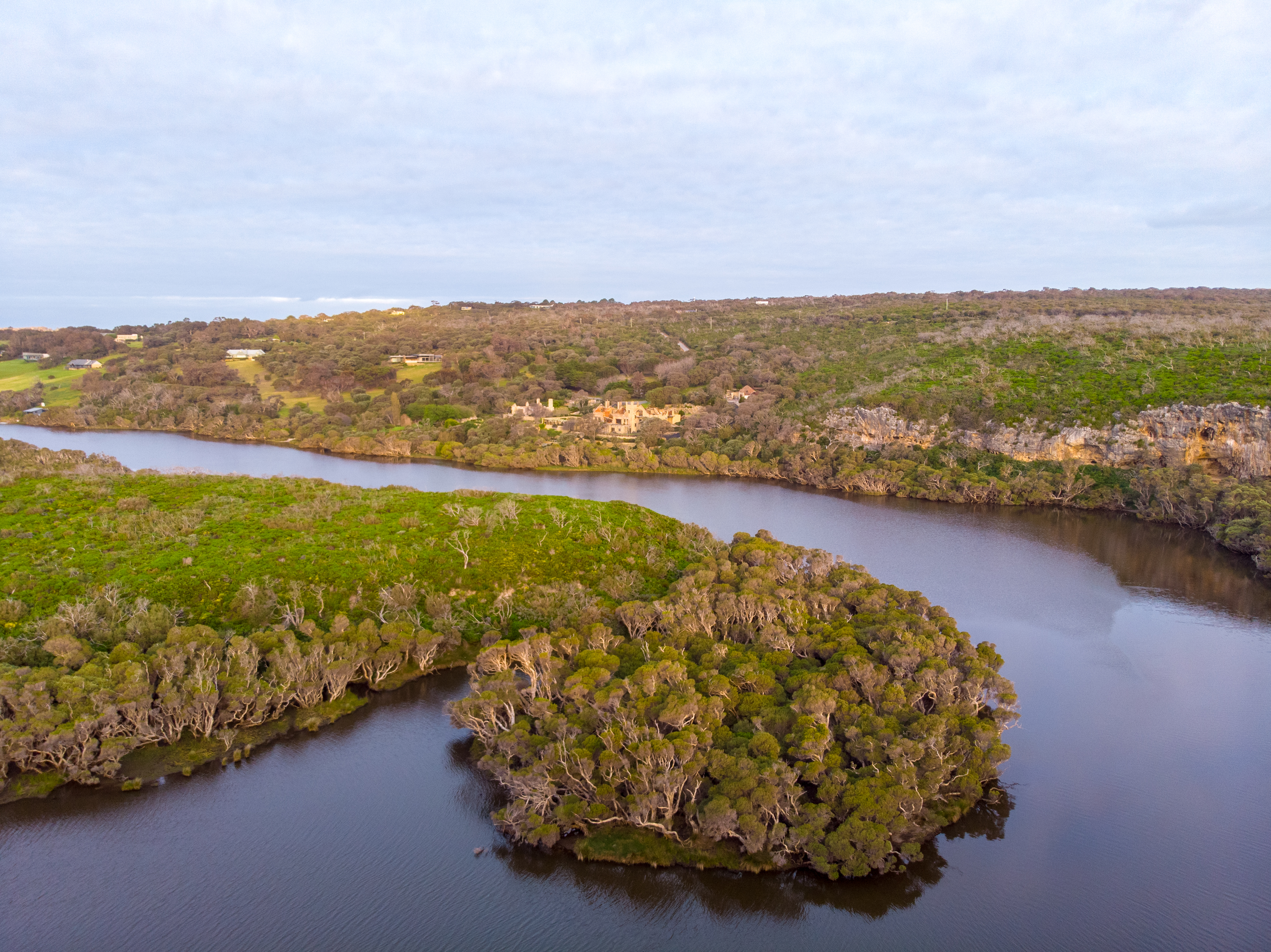
- The Margaret River at Prevelly

- Interactive map of Prevelly
- Coordinates: 33°58′57″S 114°59′32″E
- Country: Australia
- State: Western Australia
- LGA: Shire of Augusta-Margaret River
- Location: 287 km (178 mi) SSW of Perth; 9 km (5.6 mi) west of Margaret River
- Established: 1977

Government
  - State electorate: Warren-Blackwood
  - Federal division: Forrest

Area
  - Total: 2.4 km^{2} (0.93 sq mi)
- Elevation: 17 m (56 ft)

Population
  - Total: 205 (SAL 2021)
- Postcode: 6285

Prevelly is a townsite in the South West region of Western Australia. It is located on the coast at the mouth of the Margaret River at the northern end of Calgardup Bay. At the 2021 census, Prevelly had a population of 205.

It was privately subdivided by Geoff Edwards in the early 1960s and named Prevelly; the shire petitioned for a townsite to be declared in 1977 and it was duly gazetted in 1978.

The town was named after the Preveli monastery on Crete. Edwards was among the Australian soldiers given shelter at the St. John Monastery in 1941 prior to evacuation aboard HMS Thrasher. To thank the people of Crete and the monastery, he began construction of a St. John the Theologian chapel in Prevelly. A fund for this purpose was established in 1984 and drew support from both Australian and British former service men.

The Cape to Cape Track passes through Prevelly.

Prevelly beaches and the adjacent coastline are locations of some significant surf breaks.

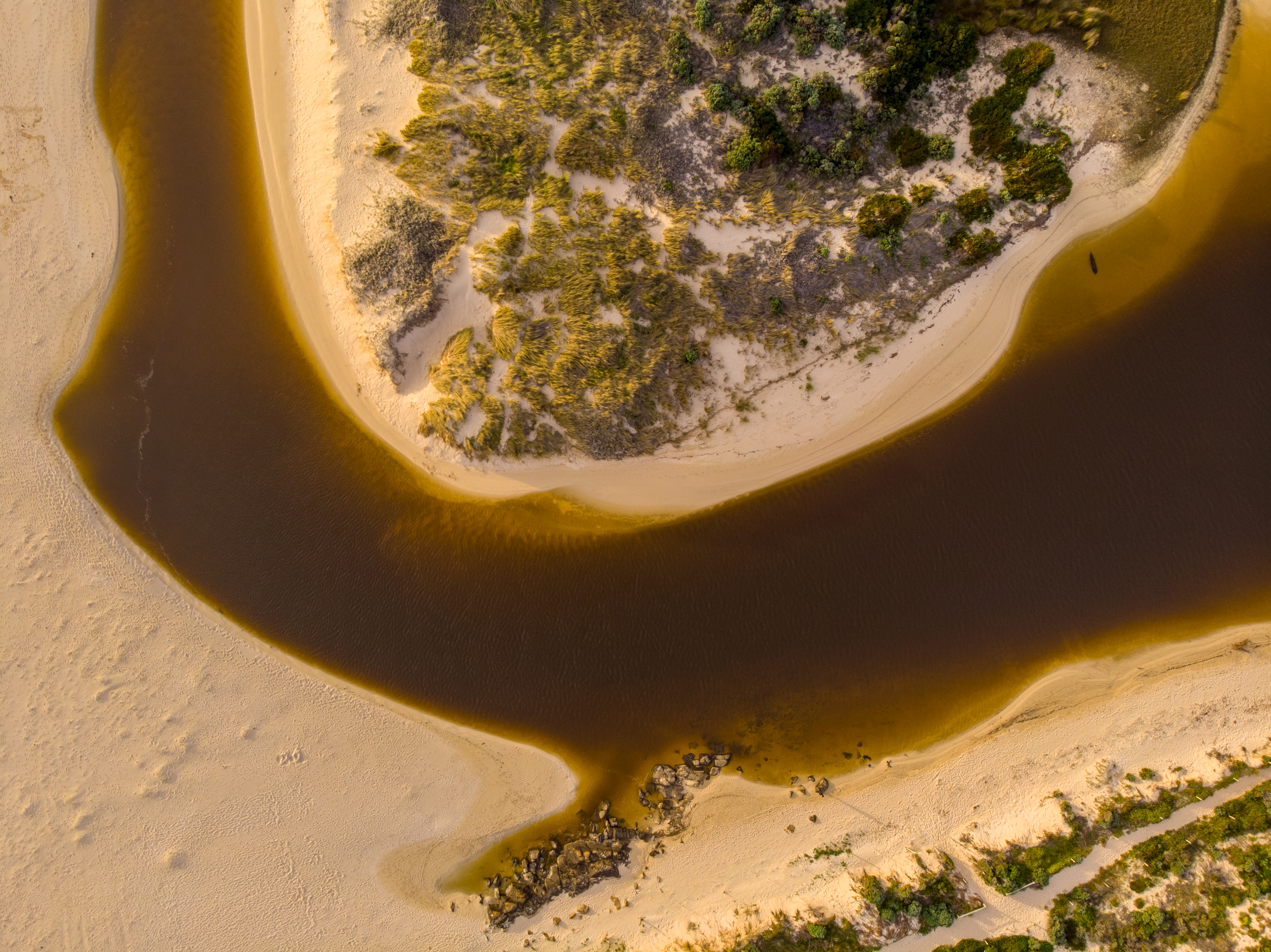
River mouth
