= Gracetown, Western Australia =

Gracetown
- Town
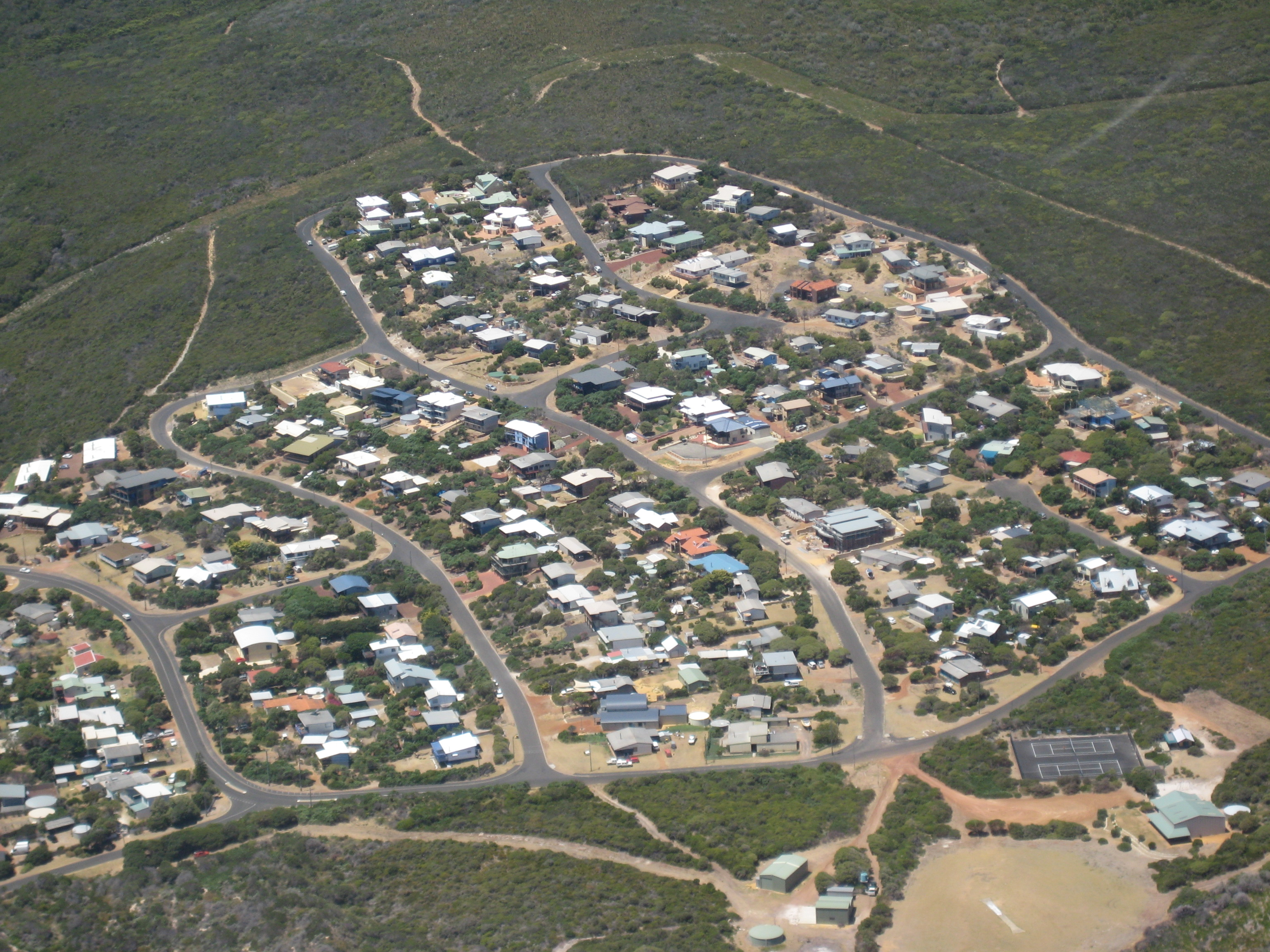
- Aerial shot of Gracetown

- Interactive map of Gracetown
- Coordinates: 33.87°S 114.99°E
- Country: Australia
- State: Western Australia
- LGA: Augusta-Margaret River
- Location: 269 km (167 mi) SSW of Perth; 13.2 km (8.2 mi) W of Cowaramup; 21.5 km (13.4 mi) NW of Margaret River
- Established: 1963

Government
  - State electorate: Vasse
  - Federal division: Forrest

Area
  - Total: 32.6 km^{2} (12.6 sq mi)
- Elevation: 25 m (82 ft)

Population
  - Total: 238 (SAL 2021)
- Postcode: 6284

Gracetown is a small town in Western Australia. It is located 269 kilometres (167 mi) south of the Perth central business district, and 21.5 kilometres (13.4 mi) north-west of the township of Margaret River in the Augusta-Margaret River Shire Council area on the coast at Cowaramup Bay.

== History ==
The first recorded use of the area was as a holiday area and later in 1957 it was proposed that the area should be developed as a camping and caravan park. Instead the government decided that the area would be developed as a townsite. The area was surveyed in 1961 and the bulk of the townsite was planned. Sale of lots within the townsite occurred in 1963, the same year the town was gazetted.

It was named in honour of local Western Australian heroine Grace Bussell.

In 2021, the new locality of Yebble was created from non-residential parts of Gracetown and Burnside.

== Facilities ==
The Cape to Cape Track runs across the beach to the west of the town and it is one of the few towns located along the track.

There is a general store located in the town that provides a variety of goods and limited services. There are many holiday homes within the town that are available to rent all year round.

== Surfing ==
The town is well known for its many surfing spots. North Point is a powerful break that provides good tube rides for surfers. South Point is popular because it works well when the breeze is onshore and Huzzas, in the middle of the bay, is a less powerful wave that is popular whenever it breaks. The main beach area, located in the bay, is an easily accessible swimming beach suitable for families with small children. Close to Gracetown are several other excellent surfing locations. The Cowaramup Bombora ("Cow Bombie") surf break, location of 2011 and 2015 Oakley Big Wave award-winning rides, is 2 km offshore west of Gracetown.

== Huzzas Cliff ==
In September 1996, five adults and four children were killed in a cliff collapse while watching a surfing carnival on the local beach close to town. The victims were sheltering underneath a rock overhang at the base of the limestone cliff during a rain storm when the cliff collapsed without warning. The Gracetown Grommets junior surfing competition has been held since then in memory of the dead.

A rehabilitation project was commenced on the cliff tops overlooking the site where the tragedy occurred, following funding by the state government, in 1997. Stairways, a lookout shelters and fencing were built and vegetation replanted to stabilise the cliffs over Cowaramup Bay.

== Shark attacks ==
In 2004 a surfer, Bradley Smith, was attacked and killed by a great white shark at a beach close to town. The town was again struck by tragedy in 2010 when Nick Edwards, a 31-year-old man died after being attacked by another great white shark at South Point, a beach close to town. The man was attacked while surfing and was found unconscious after being washed up on rocks near the beach with a huge gash on his leg. Passers by tried to resuscitate the man who did not regain consciousness and was pronounced dead on arrival at Margaret River hospital. In November 2013 a 35-year-old surfer died after a shark attack.

== See also ==
- Surfing locations in the Capes region of South West Western Australia
