= Varley, Western Australia =

Varley
- Town
- The Varley town hall

- Interactive map of Varley
- Coordinates: 32°48′S 119°30′E
- Country: Australia
- State: Western Australia
- LGA: Shire of Lake Grace
- Location: 422 km (262 mi) ESE of Perth; 41 km (25 mi) NNW of Lake King
- Established: 1939

Government
  - State electorate: Roe
  - Federal division: O'Connor

Area
  - Total: 712.4 km^{2} (275.1 sq mi)
- Elevation: 325 m (1,066 ft)

Population
  - Total: 44 (SAL 2021)
- Postcode: 6355

Varley is a small town located between Hyden and Lake King in the Wheatbelt region of Western Australia.

The area surrounding the town was opened for agricultural purposes in the 1930s and by 1938 the local progress association began campaigning to have the townsite gazetted. The move was approved in 1938 and the townsite was gazetted on 22 November 1939. The town is named after the nearby Lake Varley and Varley Rock which were both named by the explorer Frank Hann in 1901. It is thought that Hann was honouring a public servant in the mines department, Gustavus Varley.

The main industry in town is wheat, barley and grain farming with the town being a CBH Group receival site.

The town has a population of approximately 200 living in the town and district. The facilities in Varley include a comprehensive museum, recreation centre and golf course. Nearby attractions include the Rabbit Proof Fence and the abandoned gold mining town of Hatters Hill.

== Notable people ==
- Iain Eairdsidh MacAsgaill, (1898—1934), alias the Bàrd Bheàrnaraigh ("the Bard of Bernera"), Scottish-Australian immigrant from the Great Bernera, who lived and farmed near Lake Varley from 1925 to 1933. Best known for his locally composed poems and songs of homesickness, which are an important part of modern Scottish Gaelic literature.
