= Shire of Lake Grace =

Local government area in the Wheatbelt region of Western Australia

Coordinates: 33°06′00″S 118°27′40″E

- Local government area
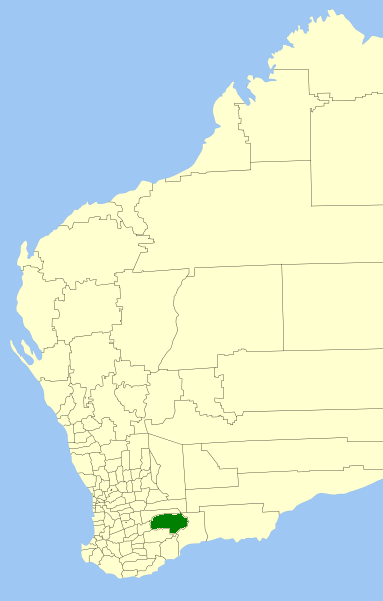
- Location in Western Australia

- Interactive map of Shire of Lake Grace
- Country: Australia
- State: Western Australia
- Region: Wheatbelt
- Established: 1922
- Council seat: Lake Grace

Government
  - Shire President: Leonard William Armstrong
  - State electorate: Roe
  - Federal division: O'Connor

Area
  - Total: 10,379.2 km^{2} (4,007.4 sq mi)

Population
  - Total: 1,265 (LGA 2021)
- Website: Shire of Lake Grace
LGAs around Shire of Lake Grace
Wickepin	Kulin	Dundas
Dumbleyung	Shire of Lake Grace	Ravensthorpe
Kent	Jerramungup	Ravensthorpe

The Shire of Lake Grace is a local government area in the eastern Wheatbelt region of Western Australia, about 350 kilometres (217 mi) ESE of the state capital, Perth. The Shire has a land area of 10,379 square kilometres (4,007 sq mi) and its seat of government is the town of Lake Grace.

== History ==
The Lake Grace Road District was gazetted on 22 December 1922. On 1 July 1961, it became a Shire under the Local Government Act 1960, which reformed all remaining road districts into shires.

== Towns and localities ==
The towns and localities of the Shire of Lake Grace with population and size figures based on the most recent Australian census:

Locality	Population	Area	Map
Beenong	41 (SAL 2021)	265.1 km^{2} (102.4 sq mi)	
Buniche	26 (SAL 2021)	328.7 km^{2} (126.9 sq mi)	
Dunn Rock	11 (SAL 2016)	566.1 km^{2} (218.6 sq mi)	
East Newdegate	17 (SAL 2021)	505.7 km^{2} (195.3 sq mi)	
Hatter Hill	0 (SAL 2016)	1,595.1 km^{2} (615.9 sq mi)	
Kuender	41 (SAL 2016)	439.5 km^{2} (169.7 sq mi)	
Lake Biddy	59 (SAL 2021)	575 km^{2} (222 sq mi)	
Lake Camm	23 (SAL 2021)	344.3 km^{2} (132.9 sq mi)	
Lake Grace	523 (SAL 2021)	96.2 km^{2} (37.1 sq mi)	
Lake King	84 (SAL 2021)	1,373.6 km^{2} (530.3 sq mi)	
Magenta	22 (SAL 2021)	822.9 km^{2} (317.7 sq mi)	
Mallee Hill	30 (SAL 2021)	663.8 km^{2} (256.3 sq mi)	
Mount Madden	30 (SAL 2021)	593.2 km^{2} (229.0 sq mi)	
Mount Sheridan	23 (SAL 2021)	830.2 km^{2} (320.5 sq mi)	
Neendaling	19 (SAL 2021)	242.3 km^{2} (93.6 sq mi)	
Newdegate	159 (SAL 2021)	297.6 km^{2} (114.9 sq mi)	
North Burngup	20 (SAL 2021)	379 km^{2} (146 sq mi)	
North Lake Grace	23 (SAL 2021)	269.6 km^{2} (104.1 sq mi)	
South Newdegate	43 (SAL 2021)	586.3 km^{2} (226.4 sq mi)	
Varley	44 (SAL 2021)	712.4 km^{2} (275.1 sq mi)	

== Heritage-listed places ==
As of 2023, 231 places are heritage-listed in the Shire of Lake Grace, of which five are on the State Register of Heritage Places.
