= Ellensbrook =

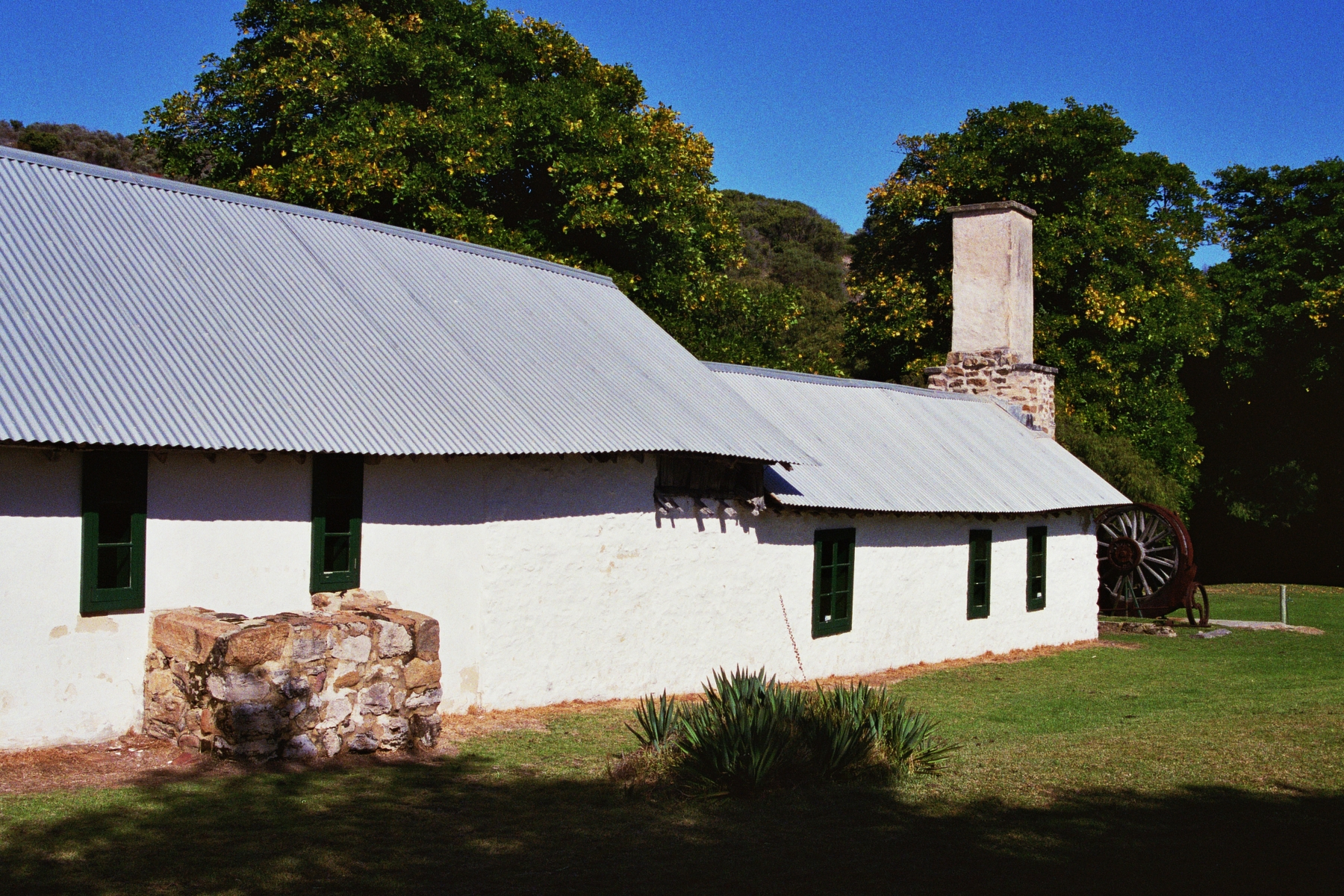
- Ellensbrook in May 2006

- Location within Western Australia

General information
- Type: Station
- Location: Yebble, Western Australia
- Coordinates: 33.9103°S 114.992°E

Website
- www.nationaltrust.org.au/places/ellensbrook/

Western Australia Heritage Register
- Designated: 17 August 2012
- Reference no.: 115

Ellensbrook is a heritage-listed property in Leeuwin-Naturaliste National Park in the locality of Yebble, Western Australia near Margaret River. Also known as Ellensbrook House or Ellensbrook Homestead, the property is managed by the National Trust of Western Australia.

== History ==
The site where Ellensbrook is located was historically a Noongar camping ground named Mokidup, close to the sacred site of Meekadarribee Cave.

In 1857, settlers Ellen and Alfred Bussell decided to build a new home on the site. The location was desirable due to its protection from storms, supply of fresh water, and the fertility of the soil. The homestead was built in stages over several decades using the labour of ticket-of-leave convicts, sailors who had deserted, and the local Noongar people, and was named after Ellen Bussell.

While Alfred and Ellen moved away from Ellensbrook in 1865, the Bussell family remained involved. Their eldest daughter Fanny managed the property from 1871 to 1877, expanding the homestead, and it was later the home of the second-born daughter Edith. Edith started the Ellensbrook Farm Home for Aboriginal Children at the property in 1899, which lasted for seventeen years. During this time there were further extensions to the main building.

Restrictions on females owning property meant that Alfred's daughters were unable to inherit the property following his death in 1882; however, Edith eventually succeeded in acquiring the freehold title to Ellensbrook, including 360 hectares (900 acres) of land, by the late 1920s.

A third generation, Lennox Terry (Alfred and Ellen's grandson) and his wife Frances owned the property from 1950 to 1956. They privately funded restoration and conservation works, as did subsequent owner John Norman (Jack) Williams from about 1967 to 1979.

Ellensbrook was donated to the National Trust in 1979. The trust, through a six-year conservation program beginning in 1984, restored the site and converted it into a museum. It was added to the State Register of Heritage Places in 2012. A Lotterywest grant in 2016 funded further restoration of the property; it was reopened in February 2019.

== Description ==
The Ellensbrook homestead is a single storey vernacular style building. It is constructed from locally sourced materials, including granite, limestone, paperbark, and timber. The homestead is situated in a grassed clearing, close to the Ellen Brook, natural bushland, and coastal dunes.

Other features are a family grave site from the 1850s, a stone dam wall flume and waterwheel dating from the 1950s. Various trees and other flora are present, having grown from plantings in the 1950s or earlier. These include a mulberry tree, Moreton Bay figs, Norfolk Island pine, flame tree, pepper tree, and hydrangeas. A tea tree hedge previously existed, but was destroyed in a 2011 fire.

Despite various alterations, the original use of the property remains evident, and the site is largely intact with a high degree of authenticity.
