= Scott River, Western Australia =

Locality in the Shire of Augusta–Margaret River, Western Australia

Scott River
- Suburb
- Coordinates: 34.26°S 115.27°E
- Country: Australia
- State: Western Australia
- LGA(s): Shire of Augusta–Margaret River
- Location: 314 km (195 mi) from Perth; 43 km (27 mi) from Augusta

Government
  - State electorate(s): Warren-Blackwood
  - Federal division(s): Forrest

Area
  - Total: 136.4 km^{2} (52.7 sq mi)

Population
  - Total(s): 46 (SAL 2021)
- Postcode: 6288
Suburbs around Scott River
Kudardup	Courtenay	Scott River East
Augusta	Scott River	Scott River East
East Augusta	Southern Ocean

Scott River is a rural locality of the Shire of Augusta–Margaret River in the South West region of Western Australia, located along the Scott River and on the Southern Ocean coast.

The locality of Scott River is located on the traditional land of the Bibulman (also spelled Pibelmen) people of the Noongar nation.
