= Kudardup, Western Australia =

Kudardup
- Town
- Coordinates: 34.26°S 115.12°E
- Country: Australia
- State: Western Australia
- LGA: Shire of Augusta-Margaret River
- Location: 312 km (194 mi) S of Perth; 136 km (85 mi) SW of Bunbury; 7 km (4.3 mi) N of Augusta

Government
  - State electorate: Warren-Blackwood
  - Federal division: Forrest

Area
  - Total: 57.6 km^{2} (22.2 sq mi)

Population
  - Total: 110 (SAL 2021)
- Postcode: 6290

Kudardup is a locality in the South West region of Western Australia. The locality is in the Shire of Augusta-Margaret River and on the Bussell Highway, 312 kilometres (194 mi) south of the state capital, Perth.

In 1883, M. C. Davies set up a timber mill here, Koodardup Mill, to exploit the nearby karri forest; it was moved to Karridale a year later. The name was also recorded for the nearby Coodardup Caves around this time. In 1921, became the area and the area soon became part of the Group Settlement Scheme; part of the Group Settlement Scheme; In 1925, a stopping place on the Flinders Bay branch railway was established here its spelling was changed to "Kudardup" in 1926. In the 1940s and 1950s, it was part of the War Service Land Settlement Scheme as well as successfully run dairies. It was officially gazetted a townsite in 1957.

In March 1961 Kudardup was devastated by bushfires.

At the 2016 census, Kudardup and the surrounding area had a population of 241.
