= Leeuwin, Western Australia =

Locality in the Shire of Augusta–Margaret River, Western Australia

Leeuwin
- Suburb
- Cape Leeuwin and Lighthouse in September 2017
- Coordinates: 34.34°S 115.14°E
- Country: Australia
- State: Western Australia
- LGA: Shire of Augusta–Margaret River
- Location: 335 km (208 mi) from Perth; 6 km (3.7 mi) from Augusta

Government
  - State electorate: Warren-Blackwood
  - Federal division: Forrest

Area
  - Total: 21.8 km^{2} (8.4 sq mi)

Population
  - Total: 4 (SAL 2021)
- Postcode: 6290
Suburbs around Leeuwin
Deepdene	Augusta	Augusta
	Leeuwin

Leeuwin is a rural locality of the Shire of Augusta–Margaret River in the South West region of Western Australia. The locality is surrounded by the Indian Ocean on three sides. Cape Leeuwin and the Cape Leeuwin Lighthouse are located within the locality of Leeuwin, being its southern-most point.

Leeuwin is located on the traditional land of the Wardandi people of the Noongar nation.

The locality is home to a number of state heritage-listed places, the Cape Leeuwin Lighthouse, the Cape Leeuwin water wheel and the HMAS Nizam memorial.
