= Deepdene =

Deepdene may refer to:

== Places ==
Australia

- Deepdene, Victoria, Australia, a suburb of Melbourne, in the state of Victoria
  - Deepdene railway station, Melbourne
- Deepdene, Western Australia, a locality in the south-west of the state of Western Australia

United Kingdom

- Deepdene, Surrey, an area of the Surrey town of Dorking in England
  - Dorking Deepdene railway station (formerly Deepdene railway station)
  - Deepdene House and Gardens (site of former house in Surrey)

== Other uses ==
- Deepdene (diamond), an irradiated diamond
- Deepdene (typeface), a serif typeface by Frederic Goudy
