= East Augusta, Western Australia =

East Augusta
- Town
- Coordinates: 34°18′51″S 115°10′37″E
- Country: Australia
- State: Western Australia
- LGA(s): Shire of Augusta-Margaret River

Government
  - State electorate(s): Warren-Blackwood
  - Federal division(s): Forrest

Area
  - Total: 5 km^{2} (1.9 sq mi)

Population
  - Total(s): 41 (SAL 2021)
- Postcode: 6290

East Augusta is a small townsite located in the South West region of Western Australia in the Shire of Augusta-Margaret River.

It is located on the eastern shore of the Blackwood River across from the townsite of Augusta, and is linked by road to the Brockman Highway at Alexander Bridge.
