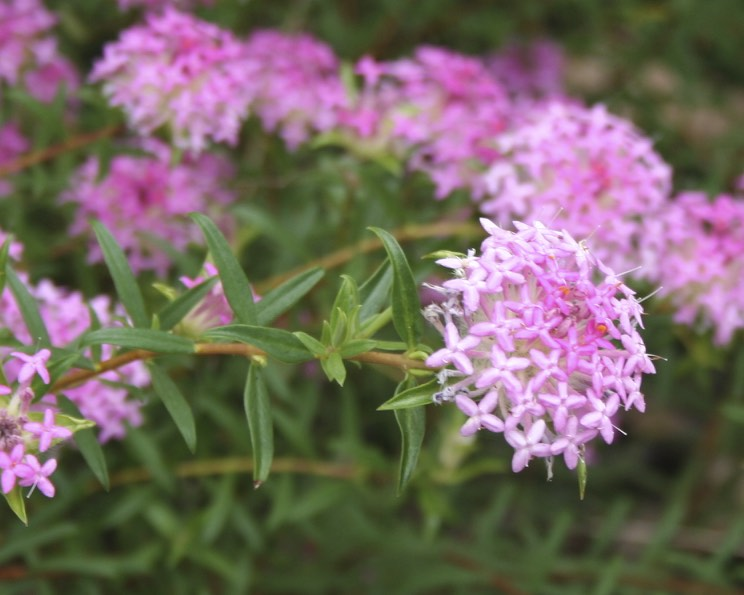
- Near Jewel Cave, Deepdene

Scientific classification
- Kingdom: Plantae
- Clade: Tracheophytes
- Clade: Angiosperms
- Clade: Eudicots
- Clade: Rosids
- Order: Malvales
- Family: Thymelaeaceae
- Genus: Pimelea
- Species: P. rosea

Binomial name
- Pimelea rosea R.Br.

= Pimelea rosea =

Species of shrub

Pimelea rosea, commonly known as rose banjine, is a species of flowering plant in the family Thymelaeaceae and is endemic to the south-west of Western Australia. It is an erect shrub with narrowly elliptic leaves, and clusters of pale pink to reddish-purple flowers surrounded by 4 egg-shaped involucral bracts.

== Description ==
Pimelea rosea is an erect shrub that typically grows to a height of 0.3–1 m (1 ft 0 in – 3 ft 3 in) and has more or less glabrous stems. Its leaves are narrowly elliptic to egg-shaped, 6–30 mm (0.24–1.18 in) long and 1.5–5 mm (0.059–0.197 in) wide on a short petiole. The edges of the leaves are turned down or rolled under and the lower surface is a paler shade of green than the upper surface. The flowers are pale pink to reddish-purple and are arranged in erect clusters surrounded by 4 green, egg-shaped involucral bracts 8–19 mm (0.31–0.75 in) long and 6–10.5 mm (0.24–0.41 in) wide. The bracts are green with a yellowish to reddish base. The floral tube is 9.5–15 mm (0.37–0.59 in) long and the sepals 2.5–4.0 mm (0.098–0.157 in) long, the stamens shorter than the sepals. Flowering mainly occurs from September to December.

== Taxonomy ==
Pimelea rosea was first formally described in 1810 by Robert Brown in his Prodromus Florae Novae Hollandiae et Insulae Van Diemen. The specific epithet (rosea) means "rosy".

In 1999, Barbara Lynette Rye described two subspecies of P. rosea in the journal Nuytsia and the names are accepted by the Australian Plant Census:

- Pimelea rosea subsp. annelsii Rye differs from the autonym in having less densely hairy flowers, the hairs occurring on the lower half of the sepal tube and forming a pure band. The epithet annelsii honours Tony Annels.
- Pimelea rosea R.Br. subsp. rosea

== Distribution and habitat ==
Subspecies rosea grows on sand dunes, coastal limestone and granite outcrops in woodland with tuart, and in winter-wet places, in near-coastal areas between Lake Pinjar and Cheyne Beach in the Esperance Plains, Jarrah Forest, Swan Coastal Plain and Warren bioregions of south-western Western Australia. Subspecies annelsii has a more inland distribution, growing in woodland, usually with marri and jarrah between Mount Barker, the junction of the Hay and Mitchell Rivers, and Narrikup in the Jarrah Forest bioregion.

== Conservation status ==
Rosea banjine is listed as "not threatened" by the Western Australian Government Department of Biodiversity, Conservation and Attractions but subsp. annelsii is listed as "Priority Three" meaning that it is poorly known and known from only a few locations but is not under imminent threat.
