= Napier Downs =

Pastoral lease in Western Australia

Coordinates: 17.3211°S 124.8148°E

Location in Western Australia

Napier Downs Station, commonly referred to as Napier Downs, is a pastoral lease that operates as a cattle station in the Kimberley region in Western Australia.

Napier Downs is situated about 130 kilometres (81 mi) east of Derby and 150 kilometres (93 mi) north west of Fitzroy Crossing and is accessed via the Gibb River Road. The property is mostly composed of black soil plains with the rocky ridges of the Napier Range running through the property. The plains are savannah country with many gorges found between the ridges at the southern end of the range.

The 4,047-square-kilometre (1,563 sq mi) station stocked with 20,000 head of Red Brahman cattle was acquired by Kerry Stokes from Peter Leutenegger in 2015 for an estimated A$23 million to A$40 million. Leutenegger, a former helicopter pilot, had worked in the region since 1980, and had acquired the property in 1992 after the Brucellosis and Tuberculosis Eradication program in the Kimberleys in the 1980s had led to many stations having to destock.

The property was established in the early 1880s by M. C. Davies and the Kimberley Pastoral Company, who also owned neighbouring Kimberley Downs Station. In 1910 Napier Downs occupied an area of 900,000 acres (3,642 km^{2}), was stocked with 9,000 cattle, and was still owned by M. C. Davies.

The area was struck by drought in 1953, the station only receiving 1 inch (25 mm) of rain when it normally received 25 inches (635 mm). The grass was burnt beyond recovery resulting in losses of stock.

In 1988 the homestead was the base camp for an expedition was carried out in the Napier Range by the Royal Geographical Society and the Linnaean Society involving 30 scientists.

== See also ==
- List of ranches and stations
