= Boranup, Western Australia =

Locality in Western Australia

Boranup
- Town
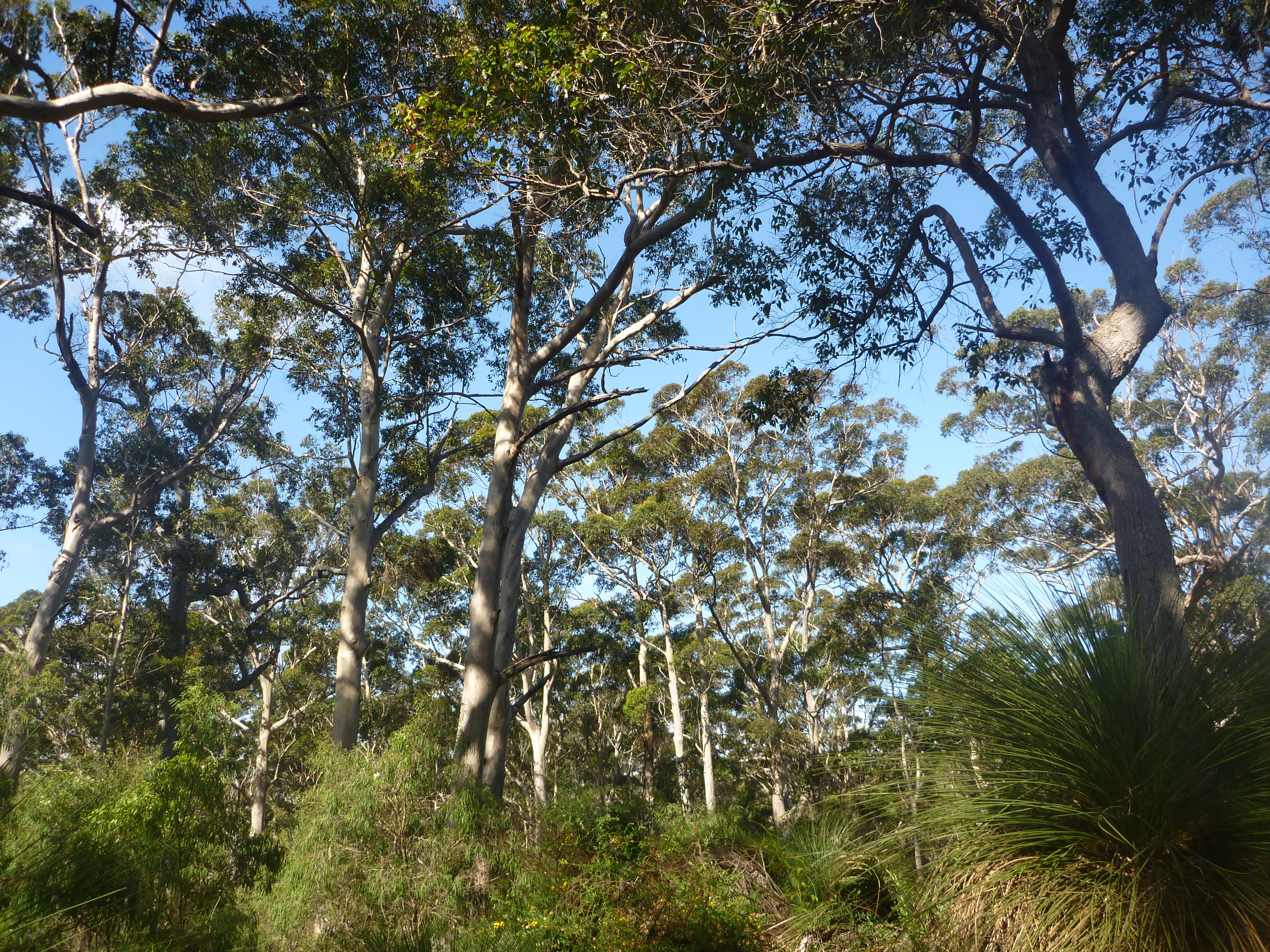
- Boranup Forest

- Coordinates: 34°4′41″S 115°0′56″E
- Country: Australia
- State: Western Australia
- LGA: Shire of Augusta-Margaret River

Government
  - State electorate: Warren-Blackwood
  - Federal division: Forrest

Area
  - Total: 106.5 km^{2} (41.1 sq mi)

Population
  - Total: 4 (SAL 2016)
- Postcode: 6288

Boranup is a locality in the Shire of Augusta-Margaret River in the South West region of Western Australia. It is the site of a large coastal dune blow out known as the Boranup sand patch as part of the Boranup beach, and the site of a former M. C. Davies timber company mill. The sand patch area and sand blows affected the alignment of the Busselton to Flinders Bay railway.

It is a karri forest remnant area in the Leeuwin-Naturaliste National Park, as well as a Western Australian State Forest area.

Boranup Forest contains many limestone karst caves, including Nannup Cave and Dingo Cave.

The Boranup area includes private property, a cafe and a gallery, a maze and a scenic drive.

== See also ==
- Karridale
- 1961 Western Australian bushfires
