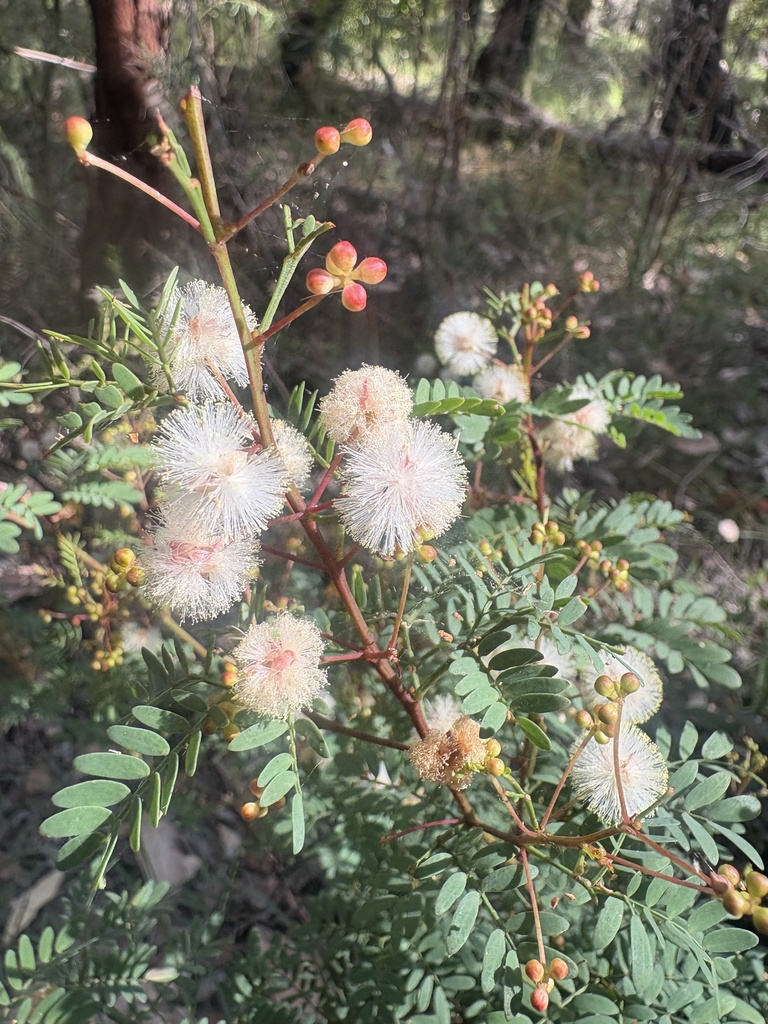
- In Manjimup

Scientific classification
- Kingdom: Plantae
- Clade: Tracheophytes
- Clade: Angiosperms
- Clade: Eudicots
- Clade: Rosids
- Order: Fabales
- Family: Fabaceae
- Subfamily: Caesalpinioideae
- Clade: Mimosoid clade
- Genus: Acacia
- Species: A. gilbertii

Binomial name
- Acacia gilbertii Meisn.
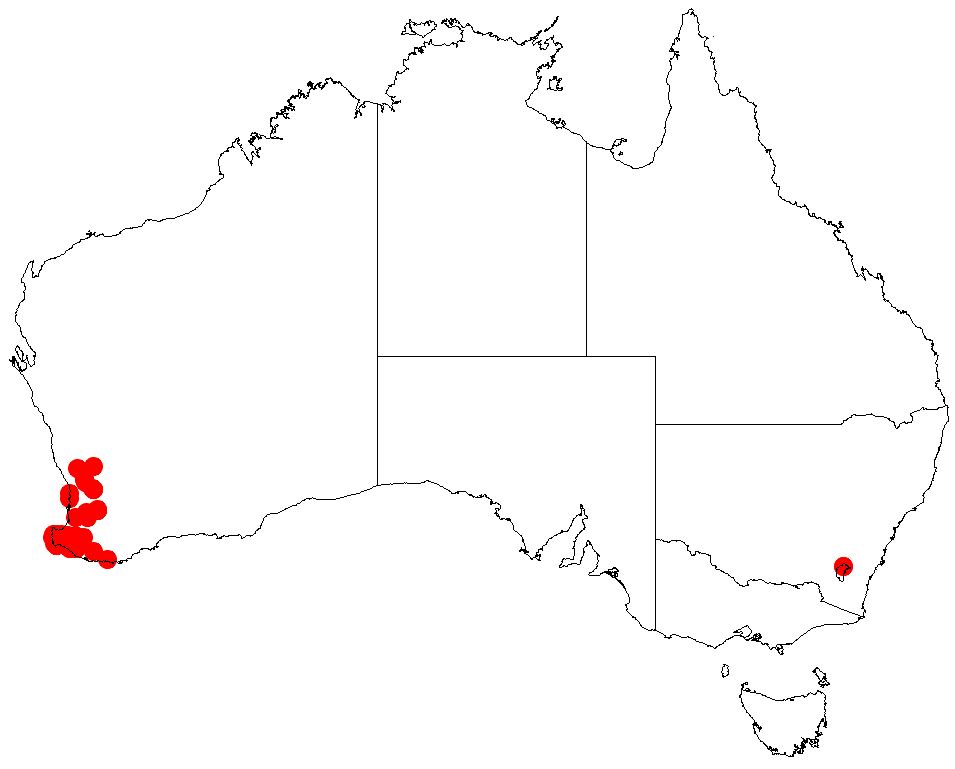
- Occurrence data from AVH

Synonyms
- Acacia gilberti F.Muell. orth. var.; Acacia nigricans var. subracemosa Meisn.; Racosperma gilbertii (Meisn.) Pedley; Acacia nigricans auct. non (Labill.) R.Br.: Meisner, C.D.F. in Lehmann, J.G.C. (ed.) (1844)

= Acacia gilbertii =

Species of legume

Acacia gilbertii is a species of flowering plant in the family Fabaceae and is endemic to the south-west of Western Australia. It is an erect, slender or straggling, glabrous shrub with bipinnate leaves, spherical heads of white flowers and often twisted pods.

== Description ==
Acacia gilbertii is an erect, slender or straggling, glabrous shrub that typically grows to a height of 0.3–1.5 m (1 ft 0 in – 4 ft 11 in). Its leaves are bipinnate with one or two pairs of pinnae 15–40 mm (0.59–1.57 in) long on a petiole 5–15 mm (0.20–0.59 in) long. Each pinna has three to seven, light green, narrowly oblong to narrowly elliptic or lance-shaped pinnules 8–20 mm (0.31–0.79 in) long, 3–5 mm (0.12–0.20 in) wide and reddish on new growth with a prominent gland on the petiole at the base of a pinna. The flowers are borne in one or two spherical heads in axils on a peduncle 10–15 mm (0.39–0.59 in) long, each head with two to eight loosely arranged white flowers. Flowering occurs from October to December or in January and February, and the pods are often twisted, 10–30 mm (0.39–1.18 in) long and 4–5 mm (0.16–0.20 in) wide. The seeds are oblong to elliptic, 3.5–4.0 mm (0.14–0.16 in) long.

== Taxonomy ==
Acacia gilbertii was first formally described in 1848 by the botanist Carl Meissner in Lehmann's book, Plantae Preissianae from specimens collected by John Gilbert. The specific epithet (gilbertii) honours the collector of the type collection.

== Distribution and habitat ==
This species of wattle grows in loam and sand in jarrah (Eucalyptus marginata) forest and eucalyptus woodland in a sporadic distribution From York to Augusta and Denmark in the Avon Wheatbelt, Jarrah Forest and Warren bioregions of south-western Western Australia.

== Conservation status ==
Acacia gilbertii is listed as "not threatened" "not threatened" by the Government of Western Australia Department of Biodiversity, Conservation and Attractions.

== See also ==
- List of Acacia species
