= Alexandra Bridge, Western Australia =

Alexandra Bridge
- Town
- Coordinates: 34.159°S 115.2°E
- Country: Australia
- State: Western Australia
- LGA(s): Shire of Augusta-Margaret River
- Location: 23 km (14 mi) NNE of Augusta; 303 km (188 mi) SSW of Perth

Government
  - State electorate(s): Warren-Blackwood
  - Federal division(s): Forrest

Area
  - Total: 6.6 km^{2} (2.5 sq mi)
- Elevation: 16 m (52 ft)

Population
  - Total(s): 3 (SAL 2021)
- Postcode: 6288

Alexandra Bridge is a locality in the South West region of Western Australia. Its local government area is the Shire of Augusta-Margaret River and it is located 23 kilometres (14 mi) north-northeast of Augusta on Brockman Highway.
