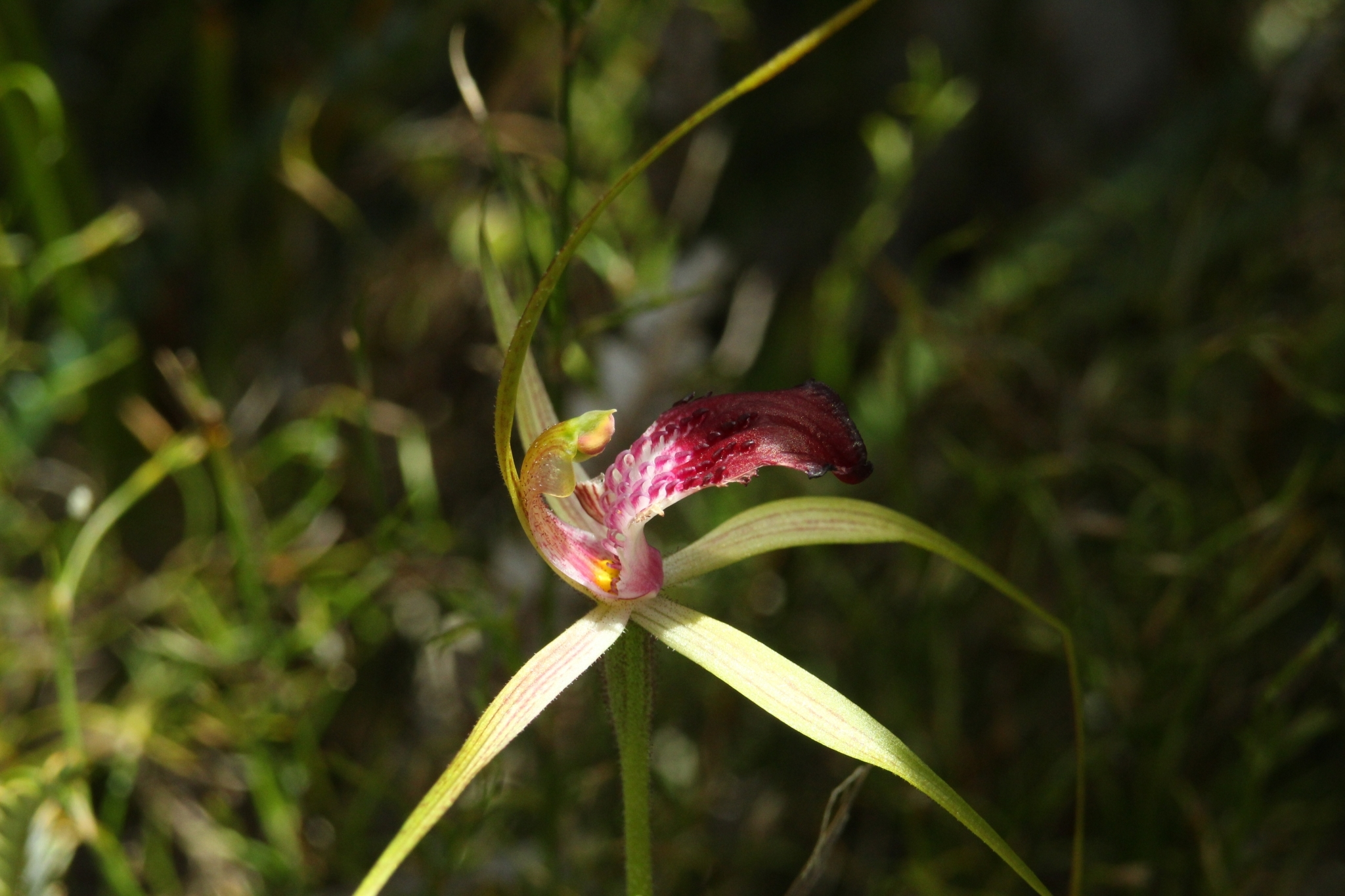

Conservation status
- Priority Two — Poorly Known Taxa (DEC)

Scientific classification
- Kingdom: Plantae
- Clade: Tracheophytes
- Clade: Angiosperms
- Clade: Monocots
- Order: Asparagales
- Family: Orchidaceae
- Subfamily: Orchidoideae
- Tribe: Diurideae
- Genus: Caladenia
- Species: C. ambusta

Binomial name
- Caladenia ambusta A.P.Br. & G.Brockman

= Caladenia ambusta =

Boranup spider orchid

Species of orchid

Caladenia ambusta, commonly known as the Boranup spider orchid, is a plant in the orchid family Orchidaceae and is endemic to the south-west of Western Australia. It has a single erect, linear leaf and a single creamy-coloured flower on a stem 27–35 cm (11–14 in) high. It is only known from a relatively small area south-west of Margaret River growing in deep sand in shrubland and woodland and only flowering profusely after fire.

== Description ==
Caladenia ambusta is a terrestrial, perennial, deciduous, herb with an underground tuber and a single erect, linear-shaped, hairy leaf 12–17 cm (5–7 in) long and 4–9 mm (0.2–0.4 in) wide. The leaf is pale green and blotched with reddish-purple on its lower end. The single flower is borne on a stem 27–35 cm (11–14 in) tall and is creamy-yellow to creamy-red and 5–6 cm (2.0–2.4 in) wide. The dorsal sepal is erect, 4–6 cm (1.6–2.4 in) long, about 2 mm (0.08 in) wide and ends in a swollen gland, 12–15 mm (0.5–0.6 in) long and covered with glandular hairs. The lateral sepals are 4.5–6 cm (1.8–2.4 in) long, about 3–4 mm (0.1–0.2 in) wide and end with a gland similar to the one on the dorsal sepal. The petals are 3–4 cm (1–2 in) long, about 2 mm (0.08 in) wide and glabrous. The petals and lateral sepals are linear to lance-shaped near their bases and spread more or less horizontally, but the outer 2/3 is abruptly narrower, yellow-brown in colour and hangs threadlike. The labellum is white with red spots, stripes and blotches, 16–22 mm (0.6–0.9 in) long and 9–11 mm (0.35–0.43 in) wide. There are white to deep red calli along the edges of the labellum and four to six rows of calli shaped like hockey sticks in its central part. Flowering occurs from late October to mid-November and is stimulated by bushfire in the previous summer.

== Taxonomy and naming ==
Caladenia ambusta was first formally described by Andrew Brown and Garry Brockman in 2015 from a specimen collected near Boranup and the description was published in Nuytsia. The specific epithet (ambusta) is a Latin word meaning "a burn", referring to the species' prolific flowering after fire.

== Distribution and habitat ==
Boranup spider orchid occurs in a relatively small area south west of the township of Margaret River in the Warren biogeographic region where it grows in deep sand in shrubland and woodland.

== Conservation ==
Caladenia ambusta is classified as "Priority Two" by the Western Australian Government Department of Parks and Wildlife, meaning that it is poorly known and known from only one or a few locations.
