= Hibbertia notibractea =

Scientific classification
- Kingdom: Plantae
- Clade: Tracheophytes
- Clade: Angiosperms
- Clade: Eudicots
- Order: Dilleniales
- Family: Dilleniaceae
- Genus: Hibbertia
- Species: H. notibractea

Binomial name
- Hibbertia notibractea J.R.Wheeler

Species of flowering plant

Hibbertia notibractea is a species of flowering plant in the family Dilleniaceae and is endemic to the south-west of Western Australia. It is an erect, sprawling or prostrate shrub with linear to narrow elliptic leaves and yellow flowers with eleven stamens, nine in groups of three, arranged around three glabrous carpels.

== Description ==
Hibbertia notibractea is a multi-stemmed shrub that typically grows to a height of up to 60 cm (24 in), the young branchlets hairy at first. The leaves are linear to narrow elliptic, mostly 6–25 mm (0.24–0.98 in) long, 0.8–3.0 mm (0.031–0.118 in) wide and sessile. The flowers are on the ends of branchlets and short side shoots and are 10–15 mm (0.39–0.59 in) wide and sessile. There are three to six cream-coloured to light brown, overlapping bracts up to 7.5 mm (0.30 in) long at the base of the flowers. The five sepals are narrow egg-shaped, the outer sepals 6–8 mm (0.24–0.31 in) long and the inner sepals slightly shorter. The five petals are yellow, egg-shaped with the narrower end towards the base and 7–8 mm (0.28–0.31 in) long with a notch at the tip. There are eleven stamens, nine in groups of three, arranged all around the three glabrous carpels that each contain a single ovule. Flowering occurs from September to November.

== Taxonomy ==
Hibbertia notibractea was first formally described in 2002 by Judith R. Wheeler in the journal Nuytsia from specimens she collected near Molloy Island in 1983. The specific epithet (notibractea) refers to the large, conspicuous bracts around the flowers.

== Distribution and habitat ==
This hibbertia grows in woodland around swamps or seasonally wet places between the Leeuwin-Naturaliste National Park and Denmark in the Jarrah Forest and Warren biogeographic regions of south-western Western Australia.

== Conservation status ==
Hibbertia notibractea is classified as "not threatened" by the Western Australian Government Department of Parks and Wildlife.

== See also ==
- List of Hibbertia species
