= Gnarabup, Western Australia =

Gnarabup
- Town
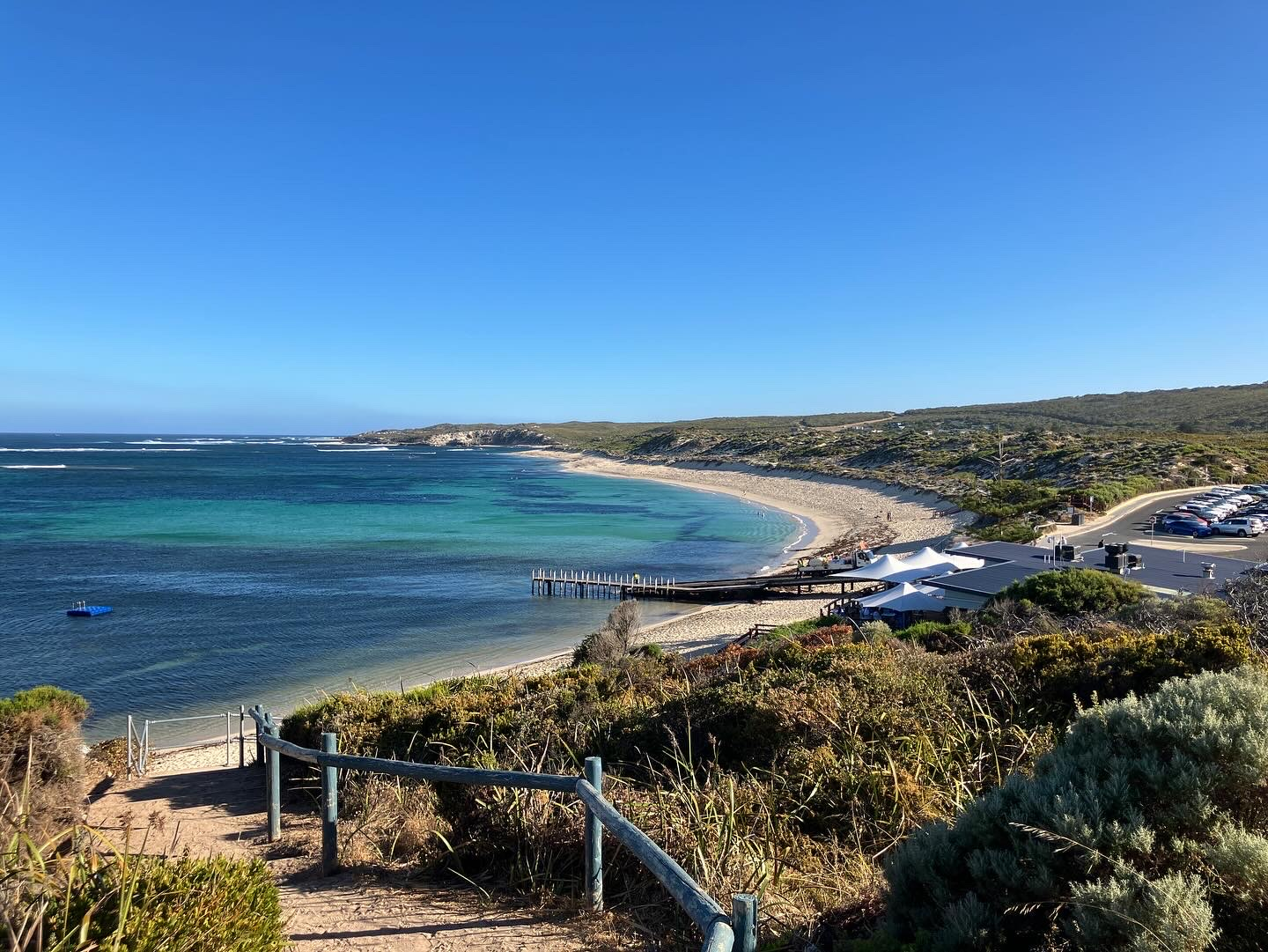
- Gnarabup Beach

- Coordinates: 33°59′40.89″S 114°59′52.91″E
- Country: Australia
- State: Western Australia
- LGA(s): Shire of Augusta-Margaret River

Government
  - State electorate(s): Warren-Blackwood
  - Federal division(s): Forrest

Area
  - Total: 2.5 km^{2} (0.97 sq mi)

Population
  - Total(s): 525 (SAL 2021)
- Postcode: 6285

Gnarabup is a small townsite located in the South West region of Western Australia in the Shire of Augusta-Margaret River.
