= Hamelin Island =

Island off coast of Western Australia

Coordinates: 34°24′S 115°12′E

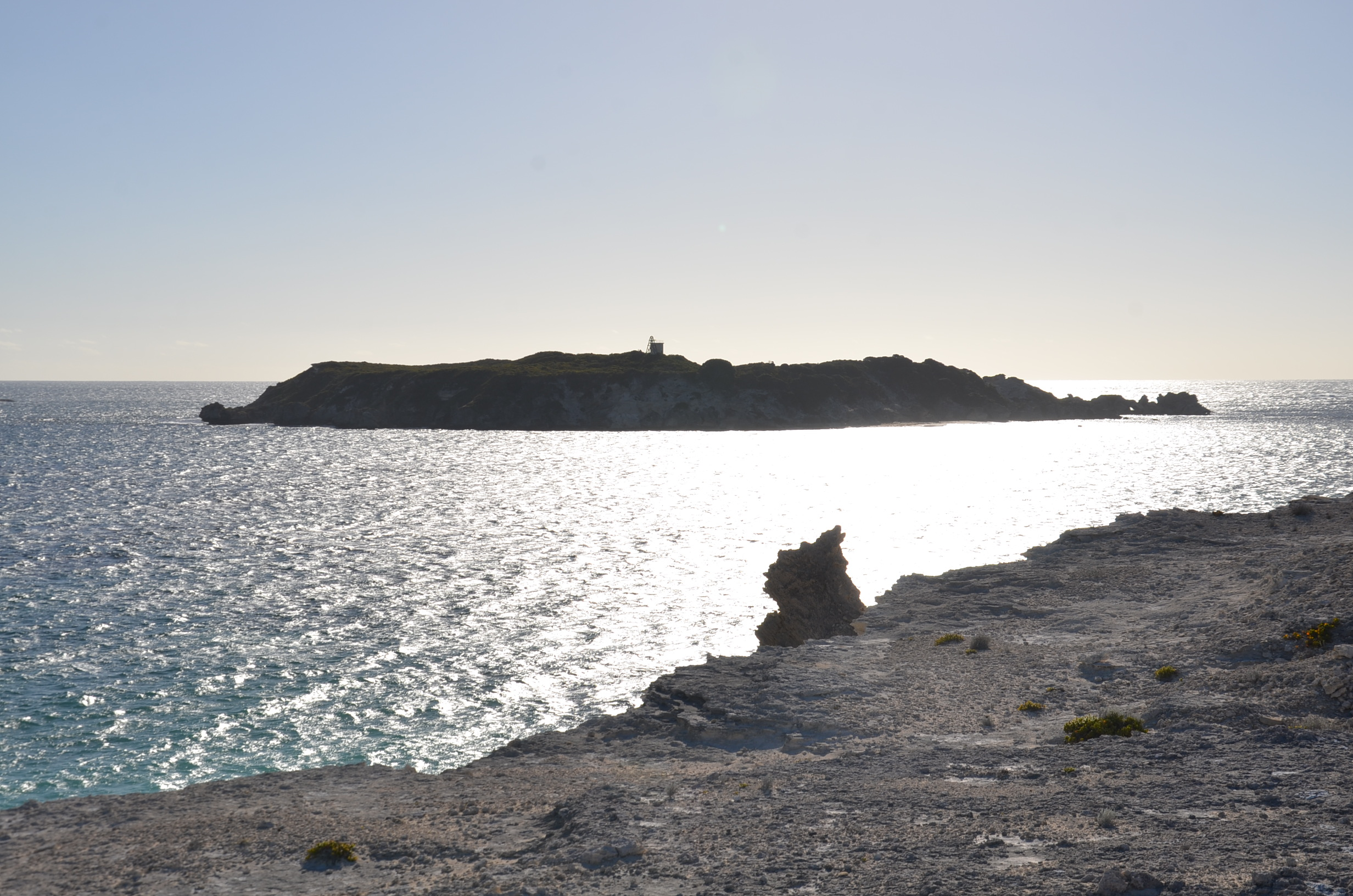
Afternoon profile of island showing the former lighthouse base

Hamelin Island lies north of Cape Hamelin, just out to sea from the former Hamelin Bay Jetty, on Hamelin Bay, on the south west coast of Western Australia, about 7 kilometres (4.3 mi) north of Cape Leeuwin.

The location of the island, and its protection of part of the anchorage from prevailing weather and winds was observed very early in the twentieth century.

== Rabbits ==
Some time before 1911, rabbits lived on the island. A 1930 edition of the Western Mail has a photograph of the island, and calls it Rabbit Island.

== Wrecks ==
The Hamelin Bay was the site of many wrecks, however fewer have occurred on the island. One was in December 1933 of the fishing boat Toba. In July 2016, a storm caused a lone sailor to strike rocks in the bay, causing the sailor to abandon ship on a small tender to seek shelter on the island.

== Light ==
In 1935 the Island automatic light was planned and proposed, to assist navigators in the area of Cape Leeuwin for a successful negotiation of the journey rounding at the Leeuwin area.

The automatic light was constructed in 1937–1938.

The light house was re-located in 1967, to higher ground behind Cape Hamelin on the mainland.

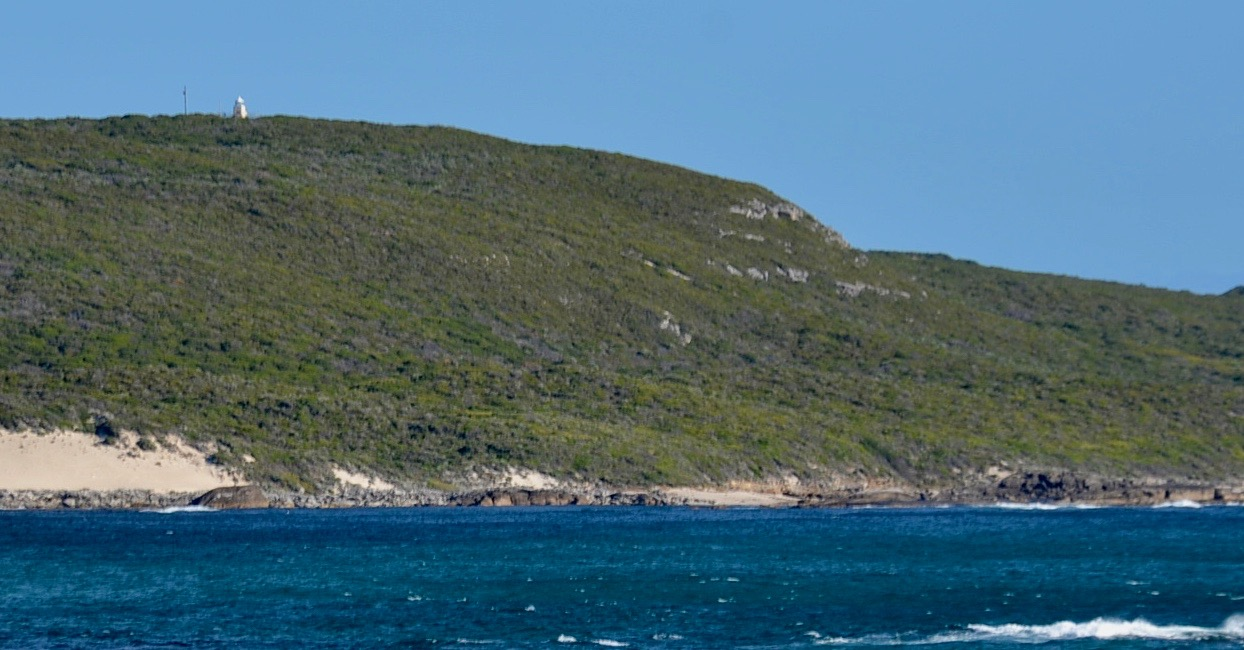
The relocated lighthouse on the higher ground above Hamelin Bay
