= 2 Oceans FM =

Community radio station in Augusta, Western Australia

2 Oceans FM (6AUG)
Augusta, Western Australia; Australia
- Broadcast area: Southwestern Western Australia
- Frequency: 91.7 MHz
- Branding: Augusta Community Radio

Programming
- Format: Community/Varied

Ownership
- Owner: Augusta Community Resource Centre

History
- First air date: 1 February 2009

Technical information
- Licensing authority: ACMA
- ERP: 200 watts
- HAAT: 25 metres (82 ft)
- Transmitter coordinates: 34°18′51″S 115°9′22″E

Links
- Public licence information: Profile
- Website: 2oceansfm.com.au

2 Oceans FM (also referred to as Augusta Community Radio) is a community radio station based in Augusta, Western Australia, 45 kilometres (28 mi) south of Margaret River in the state's southwest. Transmitting from the Augusta Community Resource Centre in Allnutt Terrace, the station is run by volunteers from the Augusta community. Broadcasting on 97.1 FM and sponsored by local businesses around the Augusta region, the station offers a variety of music, including songs from the 1940s and 1950s up to the current Top 40. On the station's website, there is also an option to listen online through streaming over the internet.

== History ==
The idea for the station originated from frustration with the lack of local content on the very few radio stations broadcasting to the Augusta region. Attempts to acquire a frequency for the station to operate on began in 2002, but the Australian Communications and Media Authority (ACMA) specified that other local TV broadcasters were using all the available frequencies. The founders of the station pushed on with the support of local communities and, after initially requesting the frequency 99.9 MHz in 2007, the ACMA allocated 97.1 MHz for a community radio station in Augusta in April 2008. With the help of donations from Lotterywest, a local couple, and the Southwest Development Commission, 2 Oceans FM started broadcasting in 2009.

== See also ==
- List of radio stations in Australia
