= Deepdene, Western Australia =

Locality in Western Australia

Deepdene Western Australia
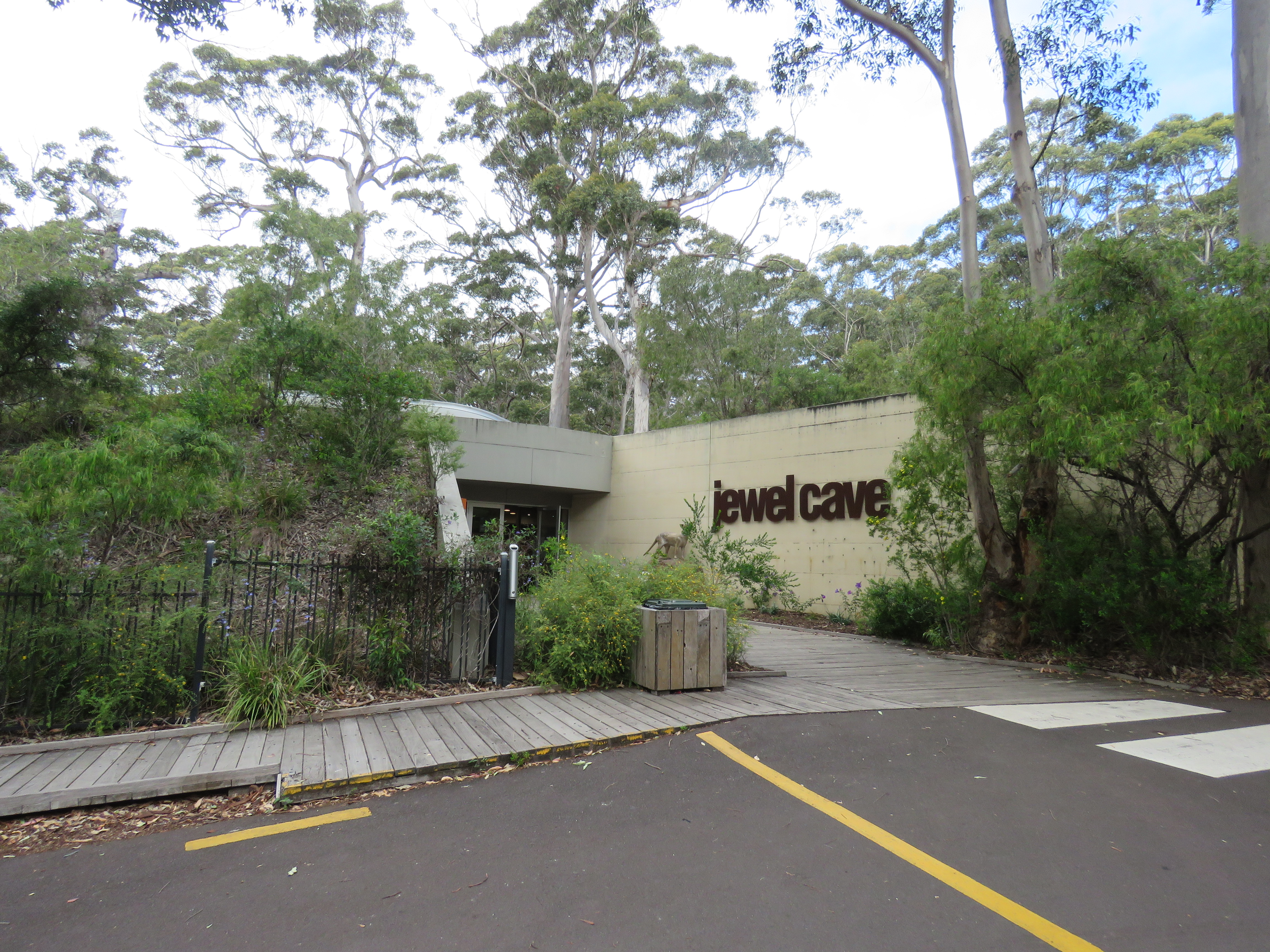
- The building at Jewel Cave in Deepdene

- Coordinates: 34°15′37″S 115°4′17″E
- Population: 56 (SAL 2021)
- Postcode(s): 6290
- LGA(s): Shire of Augusta-Margaret River
- State electorate(s): Warren-Blackwood
- Federal division(s): Forrest

Deepdene is located in the South West region of Western Australia in the Shire of Augusta-Margaret River. It is located near Hamelin Bay and Karridale, Western Australia.

It is often associated with the bay at its west or sea side, which is known as Cosy Corner.

It is also cited as being near Augusta or Jewel Cave.
