= Hamelin Bay, Western Australia =

Locality in Western Australia

Hamelin Bay
- Town
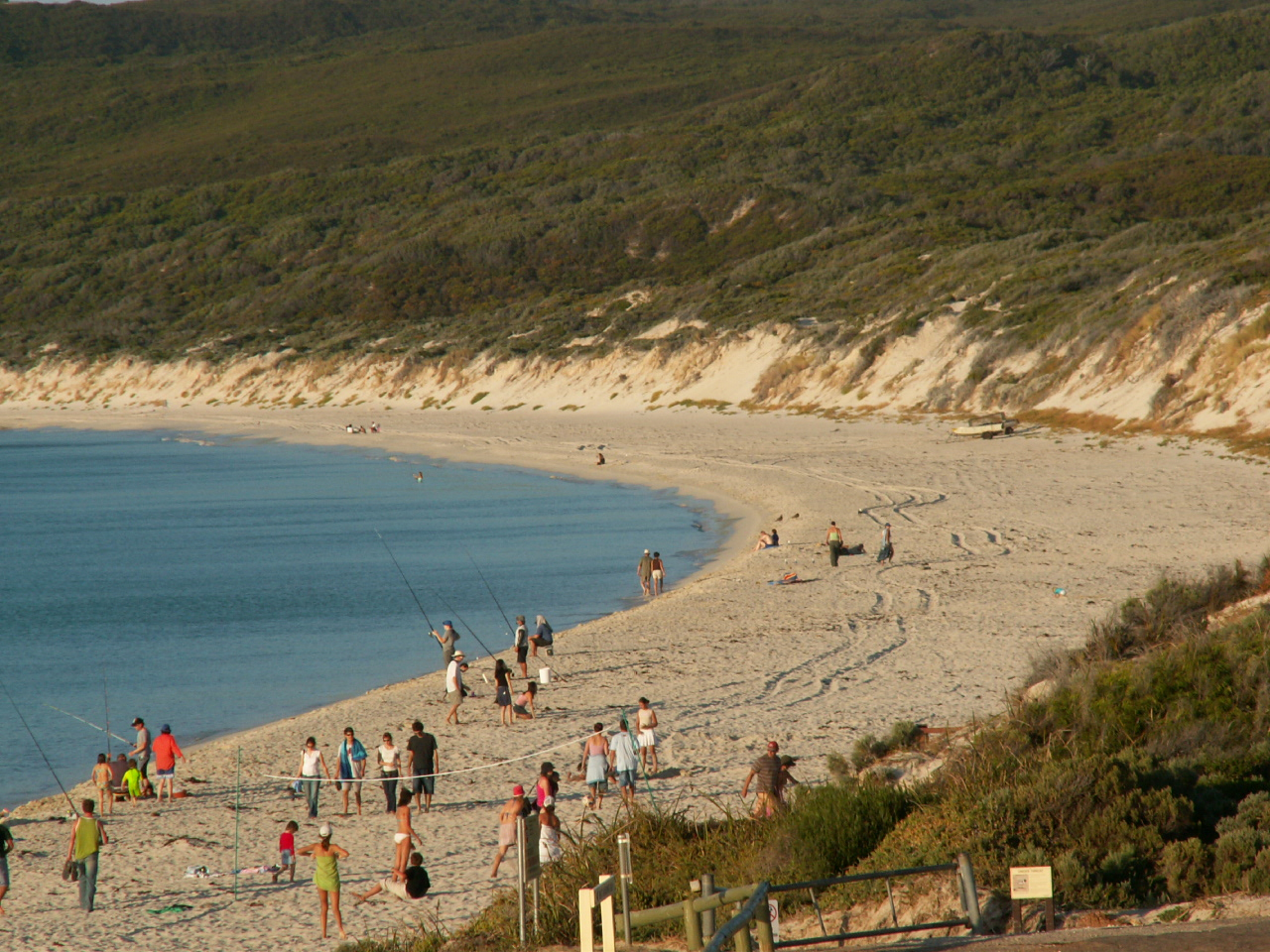
- Hamelin Bay

- Interactive map of Hamelin Bay
- Coordinates: 34°13′52″S 115°02′49″E
- Country: Australia
- State: Western Australia
- LGA: Shire of Augusta-Margaret River

Government
  - State electorate: Warren-Blackwood
  - Federal division: Forrest

Area
  - Total: 16.6 km^{2} (6.4 sq mi)

Population
  - Total: 58 (SAL 2021)
- Postcode: 6288

Hamelin Bay is a bay and a locality on the southwest coast of Western Australia between Cape Leeuwin and Cape Naturaliste. It is named after French explorer Jacques Félix Emmanuel Hamelin, who sailed through the area in about 1801. It is south of Cape Freycinet.

To the north, the beach leads to the Boranup Sand Patch and further to the mouth of the Margaret River, while south leads to Cape Leeuwin. The nearest locality to the east is Karridale on the Margaret River to Augusta road.

It was also a small settlement and port in Western Australia on the coast of the Leeuwin-Naturaliste Ridge.

== Port and jetty ==
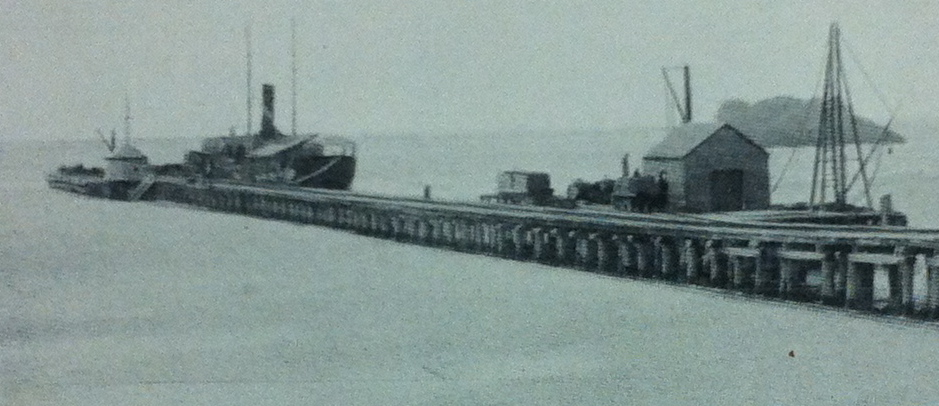
Hamelin Bay Jetty in 1899

The jetty was established to service the timber milling operations of M. C. Davies, at the same time as utilising a jetty at Flinders Bay just south of Augusta. One of the Davies timber railways extended onto the Hamelin Bay Jetty, which was built in 1882 and extended in 1898. Only a few piles of the original jetty remain on site.

== Tourist attractions ==
The Cape to Cape Track runs across the beach to the west of the town, making Hamelin Bay one of the few settlements located along the track.

== Camping area ==
Although most of the adjacent land is now vested in the Leeuwin-Naturaliste National Park, small amounts of land nearby are freehold. In the 1950s the local camping area utilised the shells of a large number of decommissioned Perth trams. None remain, and in addition to unpowered and powered camp sites there are now a small number of on-site cabins and a handful of chalets with modern facilities. A number of camp sites have been removed to accommodate these structures. A shop and ablution blocks are located within the camping area.

Due to the nature of the camping area and the local weather conditions there are frequently total fire bans in the camping area.

== Wrecks ==
Hamelin Bay was difficult to navigate due to reefs and rocks in the vicinity.

Hamelin Bay was notorious for wrecks occurring during bad weather – its exposure to prevailing weather making it a dangerous location for anchoring or mooring. Some fishing boats continue to utilize the anchorage when prevailing weather is not a problem.

The Western Australian Museum's database of wrecks includes numerous vessels that foundered in or near Hamelin Bay. An anchor from one of the wrecks was retrieved and is now situated in the beach car park at Hamelin Bay.

The storm of 22 July 1900 was a serious event at Hamelin.

Wrecks include:

- Agincourt, 1863
- Arcadia, 25 April 1900 – wooden barque
- Aristide, 25 October 1889 – wooden barge
- Chaudiere, 4 July 1883 – barque
- Else (formerly Albert William), 2 September 1900 – barquentine
- Glenbervie, 20 June 1900
- Hokitika, 2 November 1872 – barque
- Katinka, 22 July 1900 – iron
- Lövspring, 22 July 1900 – wooden barque
- Nor'wester, 22 July 1900 – iron barque
- Tobar, 1945 – lugger
- SS Waterlily, 31 January 1903 – clinker built screw steamer

== Whale strandings ==
Hamelin Bay and environs have been the site of a number of whale strandings, some of which are listed below:

- 1996, 320 long-finned pilot whales, just north of the bay, in Western Australia's largest known stranding
- March 2018, over 150 short-finned pilot whales

Attempts to save the mammals have usually failed.

In addition to concerns for the animals themselves, the strandings are considered to increase the risk of shark attack, due to the attraction of the dead whales.

== Light station ==
A light station on nearby Hamelin Island was built in 1937. In 1967 it was moved to the mainland, and is now known as Foul Bay Lighthouse.

== Railway ==
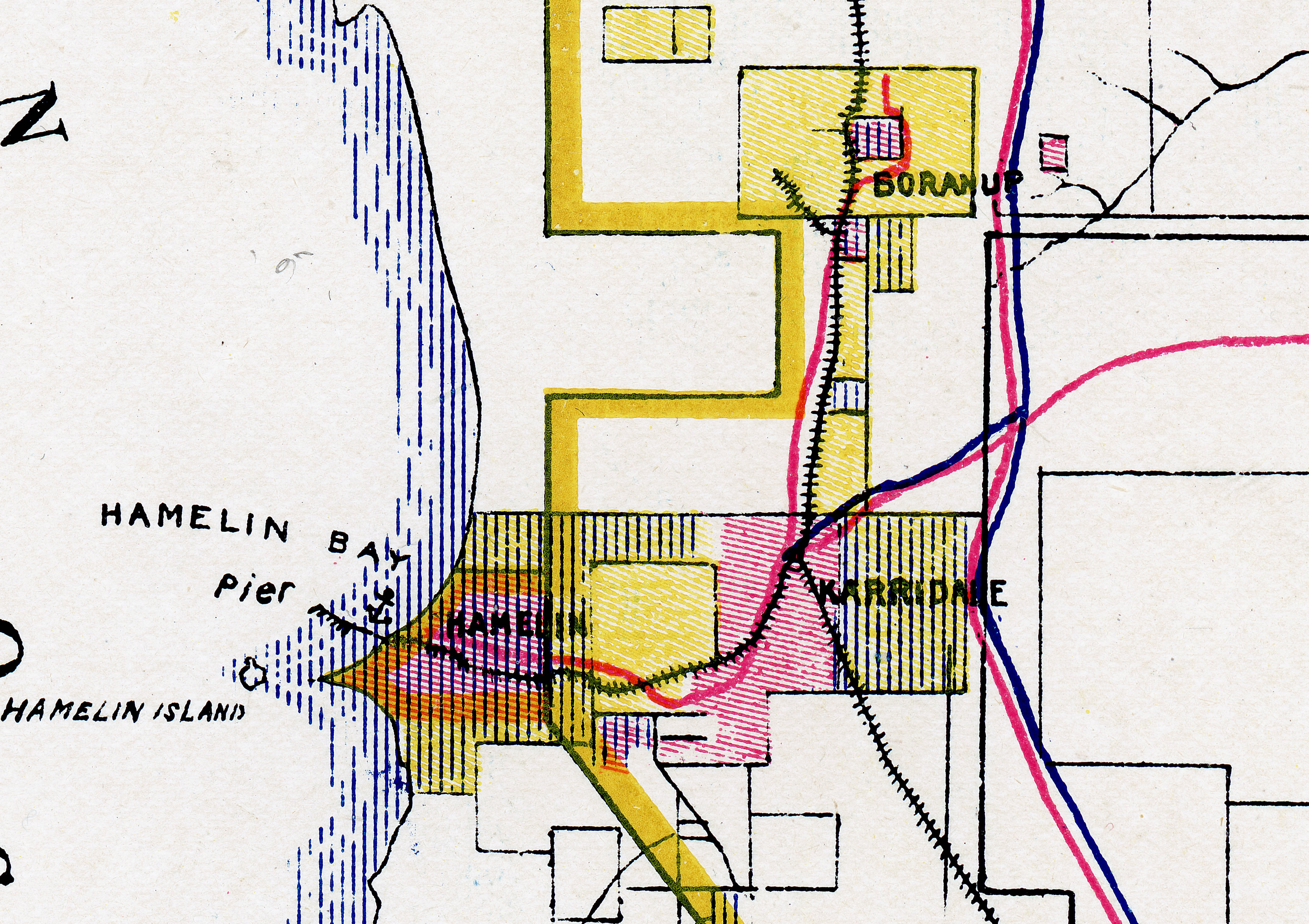
Railway connection with Karridale and Boranup – see also Hamelin Bay chart

The M C Davies railway connected Hamelin Bay jetty with Karridale, Boranup, and Flinders Bay.

In 1925 the railway formations were incorporated into the connecting Flinders Bay branch railway.

== Adjacent features also named after Hamelin ==
- Cape Hamelin – 34°16′S 115°02′E
- Hamelin Island – 34°13′S 115°00′E
