= Nillup, Western Australia =

Nillup
- Town
- Coordinates: 34°7′57″S 115°15′51″E
- Country: Australia
- State: Western Australia
- LGA(s): Shire of Augusta-Margaret River

Government
  - State electorate(s): Warren-Blackwood
  - Federal division(s): Forrest

Area
  - Total: 36.9 km^{2} (14.2 sq mi)

Population
  - Total(s): 61 (SAL 2021)
- Postcode: 6288

Nillup is a small townsite located in the South West region of Western Australia in the Shire of Augusta-Margaret River. Nillup was named by reversing the last name of Harold Maughan Pullin, a popular local who did not want the place named after him.
