= Alexander Bridge =

Locality in Western Australia

Coordinates: 34.161°S 115.200°E

Alexandra Bridge is the name of a locality, and bridges over the Blackwood River in the South West region of Western Australia.

The locality had a range of groups of people from the area involved in sports clubs, usually from communities very close such as Witchcliffe.

The first bridge was built in 1897 and destroyed in a 1982 flood.

It has camping facilities, and is similar to other bridge locations on the river like Sues Bridge, which is in the Blackwood River National Park.
