= Kimberley Downs =

Pastoral lease in Western Australia

Coordinates: 17.399°S 124.356°E

Location in Western Australia

Kimberley Downs Station, commonly referred to as Kimberley Downs, is a pastoral lease that operates as a cattle station in Western Australia.

== Location ==
Kimberley Downs is situated about 76 kilometres (47 mi) east of Derby and 154 kilometres (96 mi) northwest of Junjuwa community. It is accessed via the Gibb River Road.

The Lennard River flows through the property, and a neighbouring property is Meda Station.

The land is a mix of black soil plains with a high cracking black clay content. These areas are grassed with bundle bundle grass, ribbon grass, Flinders grass and feathertop wiregrass. There is also a large area of open woodland.

== History ==
The property was established in the early 1880s. In 1900 M. C. Davies, who owned neighbouring Balmaningarra Station, also acquired Lennard River Station and a portion of Lillimilura Station, forming Kimberley Downs Station. Davies later owned and managed both Kimberley Downs and Napier Downs Stations.

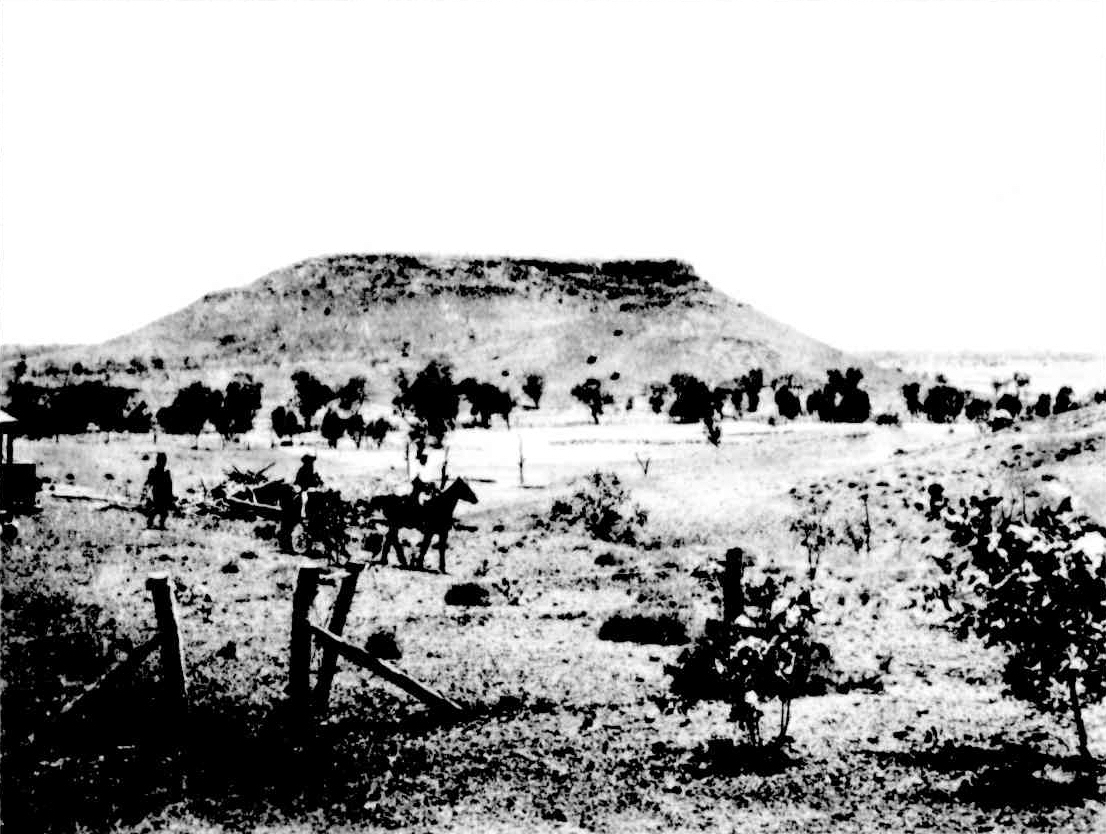
Kimberley Downs Station in 1912

In 1910 Kimberley Downs occupied an area of 900,000 acres (3,642 km^{2}) and was carrying 30,000 sheep. Eight white men were employed permanently on the property with the bulk of the work being carried out by Aboriginal workers.

The entire flock was sold off from the property in 1916. 11,400 ewes, 4,400 wethers and 340 rams were sold in one lot, thought to be the largest sale of sheep in one line at the time in Western Australia. The property was stocked with cattle and soon after the cattle tick first appeared in the West Kimberley regions. Kimberley Downs, Yeeda and Obagama were all affected by the ticks.

In 1931, 80 head of cattle were found to have pleuropneumonia in one muster. The disease meant cattle had to be quarantined.

In 1976, the property, along with neighbouring Napier Downs, was owned by the Australian Land and Cattle Company and managed by Bob and Sheryl McCorry. The properties had a combined area of 3,516 square miles (9,106 km^{2}) and were stocked with approximately 20,000 head of cattle.

== See also ==
- List of ranches and stations
