= Molloy Island, Western Australia =

Molloy Island
- Town
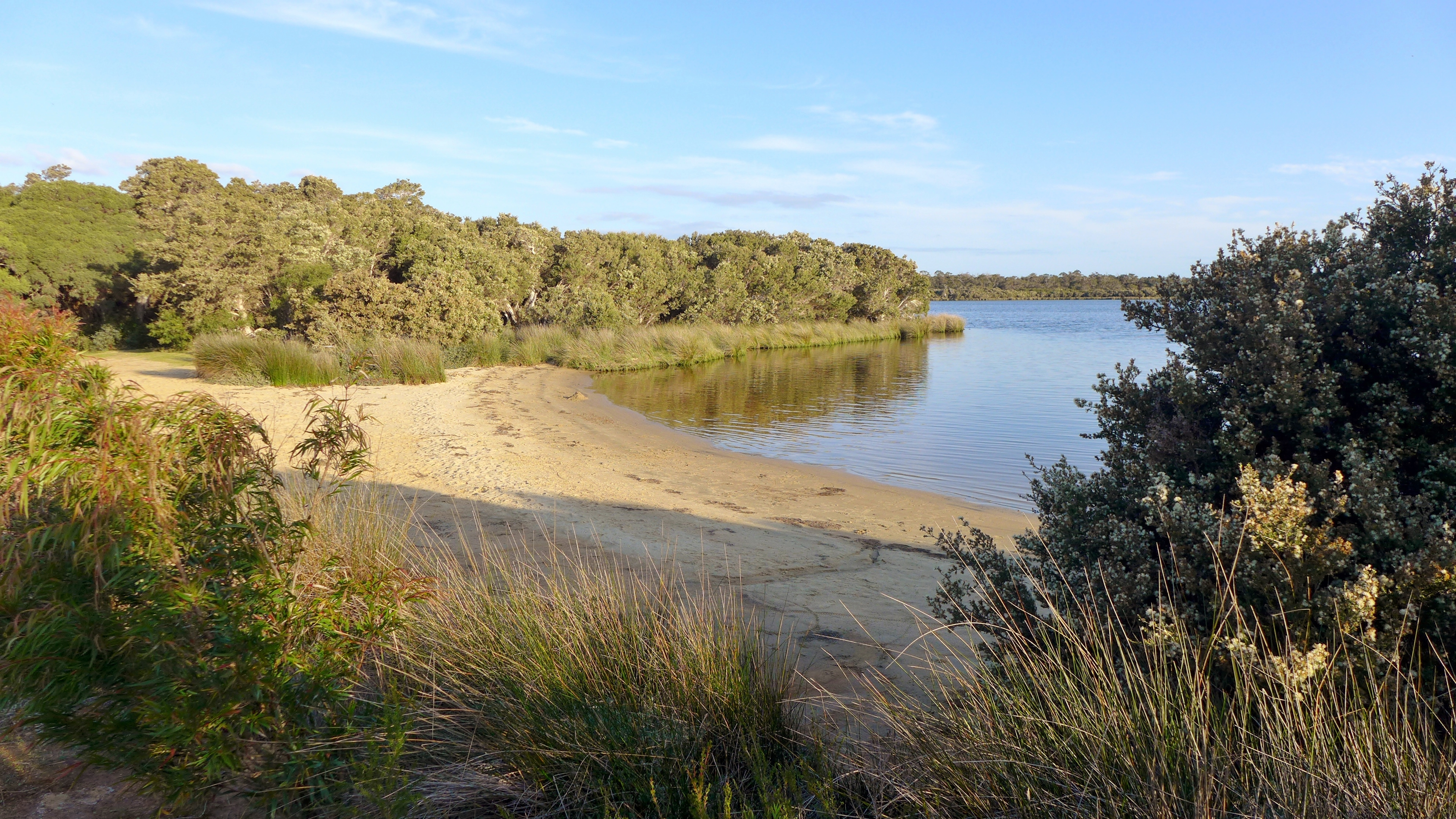
- Sandy Beach, Molloy Island, in 2015

- Interactive map of Molloy Island
- Coordinates: 34°15′54″S 115°12′44″E
- Country: Australia
- State: Western Australia
- LGA: Shire of Augusta-Margaret River

Government
  - State electorate: Warren-Blackwood
  - Federal division: Forrest

Area
  - Total: 2.9 km^{2} (1.1 sq mi)

Population
  - Total: 163 (SAL 2021)
- Postcode: 6290

Molloy Island is a small townsite located in the South West region of Western Australia in the Shire of Augusta-Margaret River, specifically on the island in the Blackwood River. The island was the location of an attempt at possum farming in the 1920s.
