= Karridale, Western Australia =

Karridale
- Town
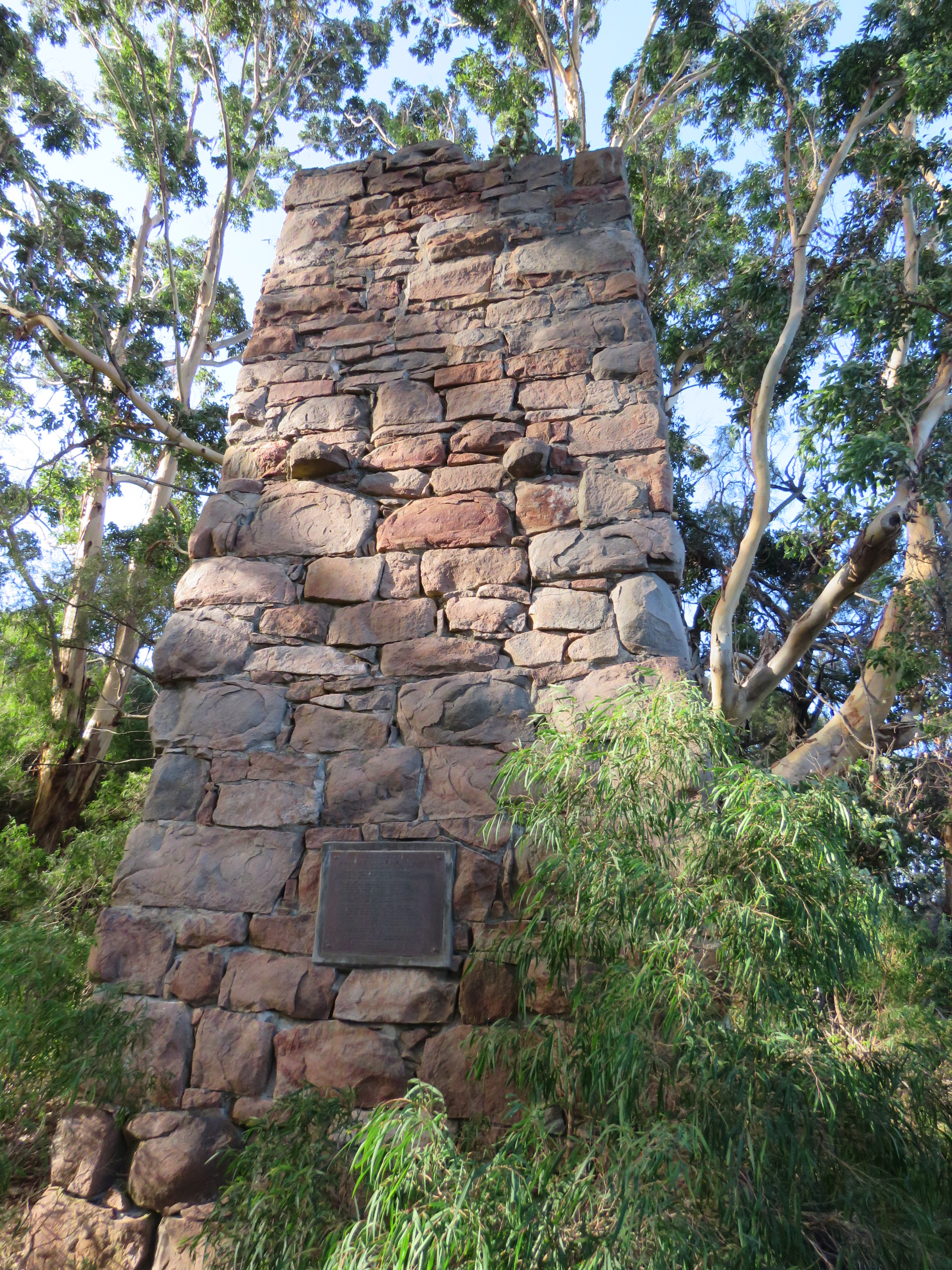
- The Foundry Chimney of the former Karridale Mill in 2021

- Interactive map of Karridale
- Coordinates: 34.19°S 115.1°E
- Country: Australia
- State: Western Australia
- LGA: Shire of Augusta-Margaret River
- Location: 250 km (160 mi) from Perth; 14 km (8.7 mi) from Augusta
- Established: 1884

Government
  - State electorate: Warren-Blackwood
  - Federal division: Forrest

Area
  - Total: 99.3 km^{2} (38.3 sq mi)

Population
  - Total: 317 (SAL 2021)
- Postcode: 6288

Karridale is a small township in the south-west of Western Australia. It is located just north of Augusta and south of Margaret River between Caves Road and Bussell Highway. A newer township was built a short distance north east of the original Old Karridale following fires that destroyed the town in 1961. At the 2006 census, Karridale had a population of 285.

Although settled for many years through its milling operations, the townsite was not officially gazetted until 1979.

== History ==
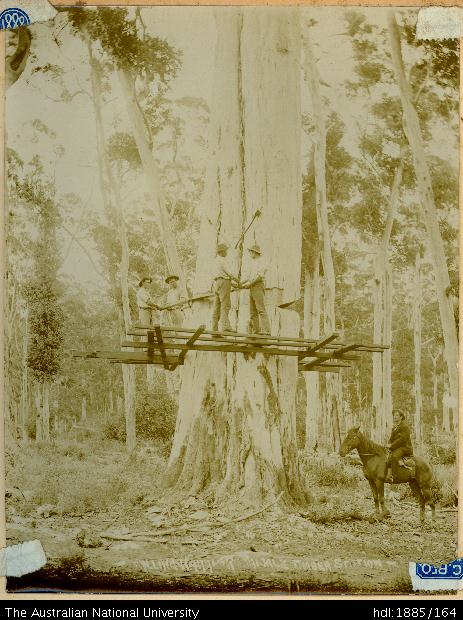
Cutting a Karri tree at Karridale, c. 1890

Karridale was established as a timber mill in 1884 by M. C. Davies who saw the potential from large virgin forests of Karri trees (Eucalyptus diversicolor) in the area. The Karridale School opened in 1888. At its peak the town was home to 300 men and their families who worked in the forest and at the M. C. Davies Karri and Jarrah Timber Company mill.

Timber from the mill was transported by rail to nearby Hamelin Bay where Davies had built a jetty to support his milling operations. A second jetty at Flinders Bay to the south supported the shipping operations when the weather was unsuited for loading on the west facing coastline. A major storm in 1900 which destroyed the Hamelin Bay jetty as well as a downturn in demand for timber in the early 1900s meant that the industry went into decline and the last mill was closed in 1913.

Karridale was a stopping place on the Busselton to Flinders Bay branch railway, which was government run from the 1920s to the 1950s.

Other timber mills in the area included Kudardup, Boranup and Jarrahdene. Between 1900 and 1914 approximately 17 million railway sleepers were cut from timber milled in the region.

During the 1920s, Premier James Mitchell established the Group Settlement Scheme, which brought British settlers out to Western Australia with the aim of settling some of the underdeveloped areas of the state. Group 4 were sent to Karridale, and consisted of about 20 families who received a 65-hectare (160-acre) block and a grant of £A 10, equivalent to A$890 in 2022, for the purchase of necessities plus an allowance of 10 shillings, equivalent to A$44.49 in 2022, per day. Like those in many other areas in which the scheme operated, the participants endured severe hardship and isolation and many walked off the land, particularly after the onset of the 1929 Depression. The scheme was officially abandoned in 1930.

In 1961, the south west of the state suffered from a series of devastating bushfires that destroyed Dwellingup and totally destroyed the townsite of Karridale and 40,000 hectares (100,000 acres) of farms, forest and bushland south of Margaret River. In Karridale, the historic homestead of M. C. Davies was destroyed also.

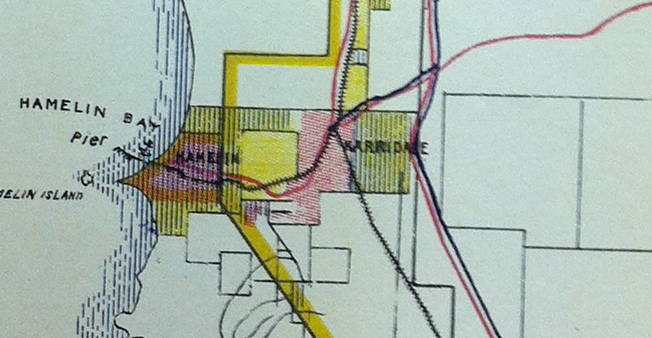
Hamelin Bay and Karridale proximity – portion from 1899 map of the M. C. Davies company operations

== See also ==
- 1961 Western Australian bushfires
- Leeuwin-Naturaliste National Park
