= Courtenay, Western Australia =

Courtenay
- Town
- Interactive map of Courtenay
- Coordinates: 34°11′24″S 115°19′19″E
- Country: Australia
- State: Western Australia
- LGA: Shire of Augusta-Margaret River

Government
  - State electorate: Warren-Blackwood
  - Federal division: Forrest

Area
  - Total: 65.2 km^{2} (25.2 sq mi)

Population
  - Total: 55 (SAL 2021)
- Postcode: 6288

Courtenay is a small townsite located in the South West region of Western Australia in the Shire of Augusta-Margaret River.
