= Shire of Augusta Margaret River =

Coordinates: 33°57′18″S 115°04′30″E

- Local government area
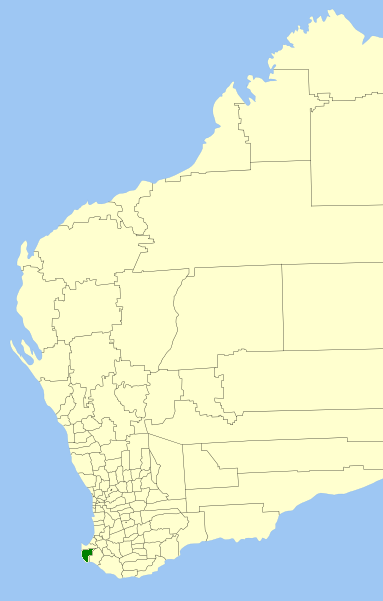
- Location in Western Australia

- Interactive map of Shire of Augusta Margaret River
- Country: Australia
- State: Western Australia
- Region: South West
- Established: 1891
- Council seat: Margaret River

Government
  - Shire President: Julia Meldrum
  - State electorate: Vasse, Warren-Blackwood
  - Federal division: Forrest

Area
  - Total: 2,242.6 km^{2} (865.9 sq mi)

Population
  - Total: 16,791 (LGA 2021)
- Website: Shire of Augusta Margaret River
LGAs around Shire of Augusta Margaret River
	Busselton	Donnybrook- Balingup
Indian Ocean	Shire of Augusta Margaret River	Nannup
	Southern Ocean

The Shire of Augusta Margaret River is a local government area in the south-west corner of the South West region of Western Australia, approximately 270 kilometres (168 mi) south of Perth. The shire covers an area of 2,243 square kilometres (866 sq mi) and had a population of over 14,000 at the 2016 Census, about half of whom live in the towns of Margaret River and Augusta.

Nearly half of Augusta Margaret River's land area is state forest or national park. National parks include Scott National Park and Leeuwin-Naturaliste National Park. Other land uses include agriculture, especially dairy and beef cattle; viticulture; and tourism.

== History ==
It was first gazetted as the Augusta Road District on 16 April 1891 and was renamed to Augusta-Margaret River Road District on 10 September 1926. On 1 July 1961, it became a shire under the Local Government Act 1960. In 2017 it abolished its system of wards for electing councillors.

== 2023 election results ==
2023 Western Australian local elections: Augusta–Margaret River
Party	Candidate	Votes	%	±%
Independent	Kylie Kennaugh (elected)	1,137	26.04	
Independent	Nikki Jones (elected)	858	19.65	
Independent	Paula Cristoffanini (elected)	732	16.76	
Independent	Greg Boland	672	15.39	
Independent	Melissa Rose D'Ath	580	13.28	
Independent	Reg Gillard	275	6.30	
Independent	Diane Fisher	113	2.59	
Total formal votes		4,367	99.57	
Informal votes		19	0.43	
Turnout		4,386	34.69	

== Indigenous people ==
The Shire of Augusta Margaret River is located on the traditional land of the Wardandi and Pibelmen peoples, both of the Noongar nation.

== Towns and localities ==
The towns and localities of the Shire of Augusta Margaret River with population and size figures based on the most recent Australian census:

Locality	Population	Area	Map
Alexandra Bridge	3 (SAL 2021)	6.6 km^{2} (2.5 sq mi)	
Augusta	1,463 (SAL 2021)	37.8 km^{2} (14.6 sq mi)	
Baudin	0 (SAL 2016)	343.8 km^{2} (132.7 sq mi)	
Boranup	4 (SAL 2016)	106.5 km^{2} (41.1 sq mi)	
Bramley	113 (SAL 2021)	50.4 km^{2} (19.5 sq mi)	
Burnside	309 (SAL 2021)	19.5 km^{2} (7.5 sq mi)	
Courtenay	55 (SAL 2021)	65.2 km^{2} (25.2 sq mi)	
Cowaramup	2,482 (SAL 2021)	95.8 km^{2} (37.0 sq mi)	
Deepdene	56 (SAL 2021)	39.6 km^{2} (15.3 sq mi)	
East Augusta	41 (SAL 2021)	5 km^{2} (1.9 sq mi)	
Forest Grove	253 (SAL 2021)	127.9 km^{2} (49.4 sq mi)	
Gnarabup	525 (SAL 2021)	2.5 km^{2} (0.97 sq mi)	
Gracetown	238 (SAL 2021)	32.6 km^{2} (12.6 sq mi)	
Hamelin Bay	58 (SAL 2021)	16.6 km^{2} (6.4 sq mi)	
Karridale	317 (SAL 2021)	99.3 km^{2} (38.3 sq mi)	
Kudardup	110 (SAL 2021)	57.6 km^{2} (22.2 sq mi)	
Leeuwin	4 (SAL 2021)	21.8 km^{2} (8.4 sq mi)	
Margaret River	8,918 (SAL 2021)	61.3 km^{2} (23.7 sq mi)	
Molloy Island	163 (SAL 2021)	2.9 km^{2} (1.1 sq mi)	
Nillup	61 (SAL 2021)	36.9 km^{2} (14.2 sq mi)	
Osmington	163 (SAL 2021)	34.5 km^{2} (13.3 sq mi)	
Prevelly	205 (SAL 2021)	2.4 km^{2} (0.93 sq mi)	
Redgate	98 (SAL 2021)	23.6 km^{2} (9.1 sq mi)	
Rosa Brook	216 (SAL 2021)	65.5 km^{2} (25.3 sq mi)	
Rosa Glen	188 (SAL 2021)	66.3 km^{2} (25.6 sq mi)	
Schroeder *	0 (SAL 2016)	531.7 km^{2} (205.3 sq mi)	
Scott River	46 (SAL 2021)	136.4 km^{2} (52.7 sq mi)	
Treeton	153 (SAL 2021)	118.4 km^{2} (45.7 sq mi)	
Warner Glen	63 (SAL 2021)	28.3 km^{2} (10.9 sq mi)	
Witchcliffe	484 (SAL 2021)	54.7 km^{2} (21.1 sq mi)	
Yebble	^{[1]}	18.1 km^{2} (7.0 sq mi)	

- (* indicates locality is only partially located within this shire)

=== Notes ===
- ^[1] Locality was created in 2021, the year of the census; no population data is available.

== Population ==
The historical figures for the population of the shire have been recorded in the census as follows:

Historical population

Year	Pop.	±% p.a.
1911	446	—
1921	200	−7.71%
1933	2,952	+25.15%
1947	2,790	−0.40%
1954	3,625	+3.81%
1961	3,590	−0.14%
1966	3,238	−2.04%
1971	3,106	−0.83%
1976	3,011	−0.62%

Year	Pop.	±% p.a.
1981	3,680	+4.09%
1986	5,333	+7.70%
1991	5,889	+2.00%
1996	8,047	+6.44%
2001	9,655	+3.71%
2006	10,353	+1.41%
2011	11,761	+2.58%
2016	14,258	+3.93%
2021	16,791	+3.32%

== Notable councillors ==
- Barry Blaikie, Shire of Augusta Margaret River councillor 1965–1971, later a state MP

== Heritage-listed places ==
As of 2023, 143 places are heritage-listed in the Shire of Augusta Margaret River, of which eleven are on the State Register of Heritage Places, among them the Cape Leeuwin Lighthouse, Wallcliffe House and Ellensbrook.

== Map ==
- Western Australia. Dept. of Land Administration. Cartographic Services Branch. (2004) South West Corner/Western Australia Perth, W.A.. Scale 1:150 000 ; (E 114°58'--E 115°40'/S 033°27'--S 034°25') Also known as StreetSmart Touring Map - with localities Augusta, Busselton, Dunsborough and Margaret River on title ISBN 0-7309-2907-8
