= M. C. Davies =

Western Australian businessman

Maurice Coleman Davies (24 September 1835 – 10 May 1913) was an Australian timber merchant and pastoralist. Born in London, he emigrated to Tasmania with his family as a child, and later moved to Blackwood in the Victorian goldfields, then to Melbourne and Adelaide. He then relocated to Western Australia, where he created the M. C. Davies Company, later the M. C. Davies Karri and Jarrah Timber Company, a timber empire that employed hundreds of men, laid over a hundred kilometres of private railway, including the Flinders Bay branch railway, and even built its own private ports for exporting of timber. He also formed the Kimberley Pastoral Company and was its managing director.

== Early years ==
Davies was born in London on 24 September 1835 to John and Catherine Davies (née Hart; 1795–1889). His family migrated to Australia when he was about five years old, and settled in southern Tasmania as farmers. In 1847, the family moved to New Norfolk, where Davies' father found work as a shopkeeper. In 1851 the Davies family joined the gold rush to the Victorian Goldfields, where Davies worked in Blackwood; he later moved to Melbourne.

In 1856 Davies moved to South Australia, establishing himself as a supplier of building materials. His venture was a financial success, and by 1867 he was operating as a general commission agent and merchant in Adelaide, specialising in the supply of hardwood timber to the railway and construction industries. He was associated with John Wishart in building a bridge over the River Torrens, then in 1872 was part of Baillie, Davies and Wishart, who successfully tendered for the construction of the Aldgate to Nairne section of the Adelaide to Melbourne railway. This required a steady supply of quality hardwood, which was scarce in South Australia. Davies was involved in the difficult task of contracting for timber, and during this time he became interested in the large forests of jarrah and karri in Western Australia. In 1875, he applied for a lease of 1,920 acres (780 ha) of forest in Bunbury, and the following year was granted a licence to cut timber. He then erected two saw mills on the Collie River, which operated for eight years. The success of these mills was limited, mainly because of the poor quality of road between the mills and the port of Bunbury.

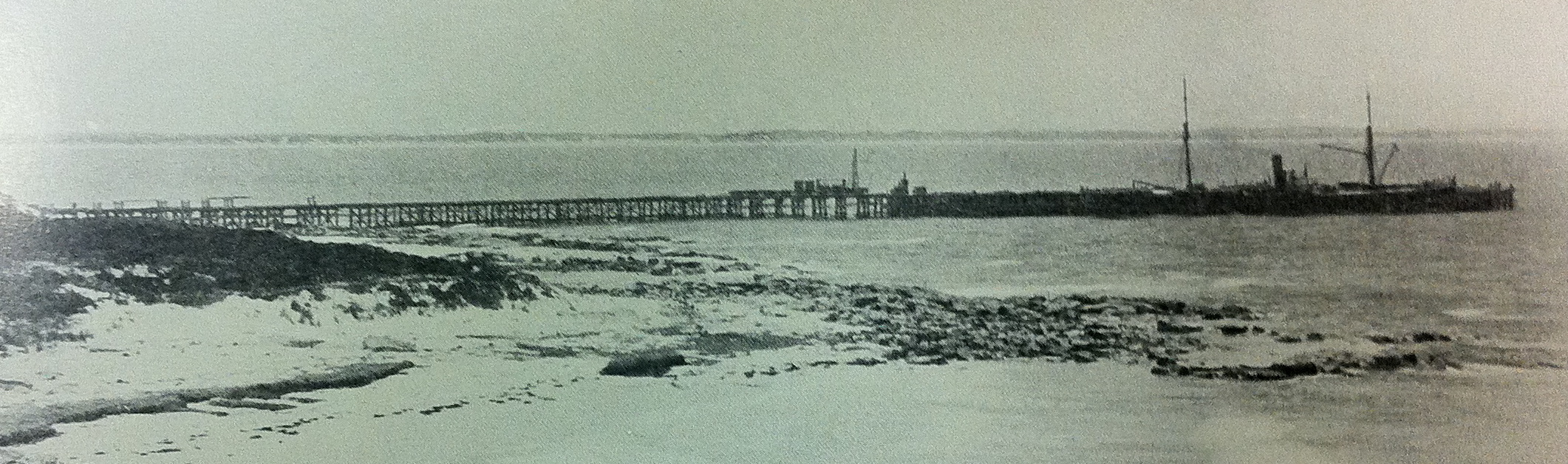
Flinders Bay jetty

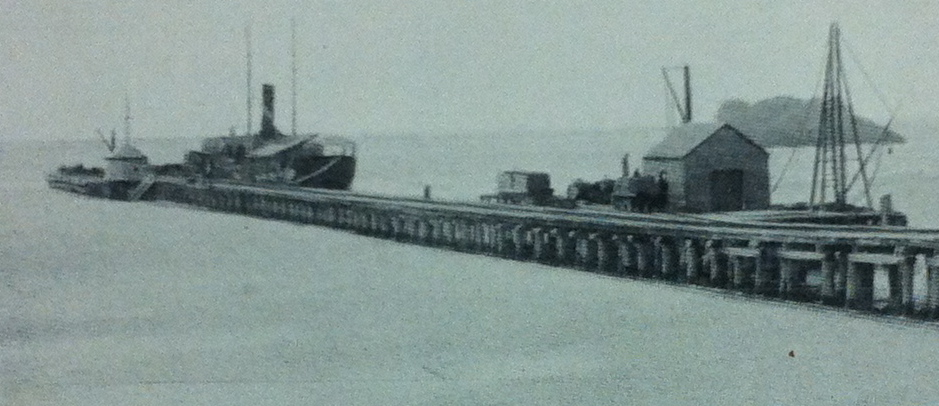
Hamelin Bay jetty

== Timber industry ==
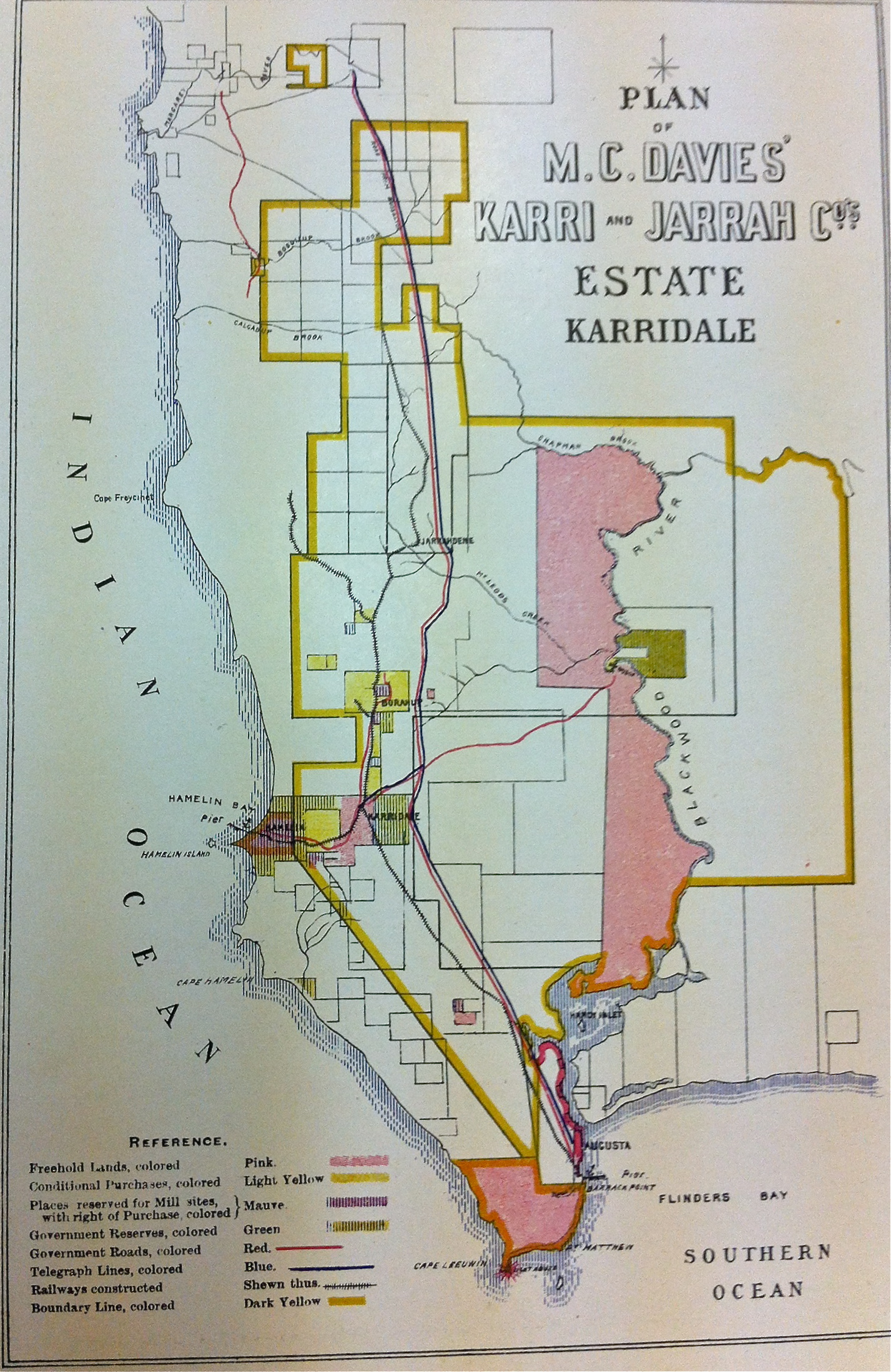
M. C. Davies timber concessions in 1899

From 1877, Davies became increasingly interested in the timber country north of Augusta. This area contained excellent forests of jarrah and karri, and there were bays nearby where ships could be loaded. Davies sought a licence to work the area in 1879, but was rejected. He eventually obtained timber rights in 1882, and over the following years he consolidated with numerous additional land purchases and licences. His business prospered, and he built numerous saw mills and over 100 kilometres (62 mi) of railway line, including the Flinders Bay branch railway, to cart the timber. Jetties were built to enable loading of ships in Hamelin and Flinders Bays, and the town of Karridale was established to house the hundreds of workers employed by Davies. Davies' business became so successful that by 1890 he was responsible for 32% of all timber exported from Western Australia.

By 1894, all six of Davies' sons were involved in his business, and the name of the business was changed from M. C. Davies to M. C. Davies Company Ltd. In that year he successfully lobbied for the construction of what became Bussell Highway and he was also involved in the construction of the Cape Leeuwin Lighthouse in 1895. His timber business continued to prosper and expand, but the timber markets expanded even more rapidly, and by 1897 the company no longer had the resources to keep pace with market growth. In that year, Davies went to London to float the business as a public company, under the name M. C. Davies Karri and Jarrah Company Ltd.

== Amalgamation of timber business, other ventures, and final years ==
The next five years were difficult for Davies' business. Many new companies had entered the timber market in Western Australia, and there was fierce competition. South African demand for timber had been seriously affected by the Second Boer War, and other overseas markets were flooded with jarrah and karri. In 1902, M. C. Davies Karri and Jarrah Co. Ltd amalgamated with seven other companies to form Millars Karri and Jarrah Forests Limited, informally known as the "Millars Combine". The main Karridale mill was closed soon after, and by 1913 all of the M. C. Davies Company mills were closed.

Davies retired from sawmilling after the formation of the Millers Combine. However, he also had interests in other fields, including shipping, gold-mining, and especially the pastoral industry. He was involved in the 1881 formation of the Kimberley Pastoral Company, which bought the Liveringa station, and was the company's managing director until 1913. He made various acquisitions that he eventually amalgamated into Kimberley Downs station and his family controlled Napier Downs. He also ran Palmirup Grazing Company, which had large holdings in the Kojonup and Katanning areas. He died at his home at St Georges Terrace, Perth on 10 May 1913 and was buried in the Jewish section of Karrakatta Cemetery.

== Personal life ==
On 24 March 1858, Davies married Sarah Salom, sister of Maurice Salom. The couple had twelve children, four of whom predeceased Davies; six sons and two daughters outlived him.

== See also ==
- Neil McNeil, another early figure in the Western Australian timber industry
- Cape Leeuwin water wheel
