= 1961 Western Australian bushfires =

Series of bushfires in Western Australia

In early 1961, a series of bushfires burned in the south-west region of Western Australia. The devastating fires burned large areas of forest in and around Dwellingup from 20 to 24 January, at Pemberton and in the Shannon River region between 11 and 15 February, and in the Augusta-Margaret River area in early March. There were also major fires which burned in the Darling Scarp around Kalamunda. The towns of Dwellingup and Karridale were largely destroyed by the fires, as were a number of smaller railway and mill settlements. There was no loss of human life.

Whilst the 1960 rainy season over the affected region had not been excessively dry, rainfall had been below average over the region affected by the fires ever since August of that year - thus the forests were perhaps even drier than they would normally be by January. However, the underlying cause of the Dwellingup fires lay far to the north in the Pilbara, where a tropical cyclone had formed on 15 January northeast of Darwin had followed a trajectory along the north west Western Australian coast and intensified north east of Onslow and then moved steadily southwards, hitting that town on 24–25 January while having a central pressure of 920 hPa. Hurricane-force winds demolished several buildings and storm surge inundated the town with 1.8 metres water. With a strong high pressure system to the east of the cyclone remaining almost stationary for some days, hot north-easterly winds developed and became so intense that by the 20th maximum temperatures throughout the south west were uniformly above 40 °C (104 °F) and remained at that level for the following five days. During this period, as the cyclone moved slowly along the coast it drenched Onslow and the neighbouring district, but only dry thunderstorms occurred in the south-west, which started fires that spread extremely rapidly in the hot, windy conditions.

The first fires were reported from Dwellingup, 110 kilometres (68 mi) south of Perth, on 19 January and the following day fires erupted in the timbered country of the Darling Scarp around Mundaring and Mount Helena. Although as the cyclone tracked down the west coast some rain came around 25 January to ease the fires, not all were fully extinguished. Moreover, as the normal dry summer weather evaporated further moisture from the forests, when another severe cyclone hit Onslow on 12 February it caused even stronger winds (sustained at up to 60 kilometres per hour (37 mph) with much stronger gusts) and as this cyclone moved inland, lost intensity and produced no rain in fire-affected areas, decaying bushfires were re-ignited.

The fire from Dwellingup consequently moved downslope toward the major town of Pinjarra where it burned a significant portion of the town's buildings—500 people were left homeless. As the forests surrounding began re-igniting, the entire population of a number of other mill towns was relocated to Dwellingup in the following days. The fires continued to burn owing to the strong winds, and many tiny timber towns were completely burnt out - Holyoake, Nanga Brook, Marrinup and Banksiadale; and were never re-built.

The 2 March saw Onslow’s third cyclone in five weeks, which like the second did not produce any rain in the affected areas and led to temperatures reaching in Perth 37.8 °C (100.0 °F) on the first two days of March for the first time. Fires spread southward to Augusta-Margaret River Shire, though some in that area were thought to have been deliberately lit, and continued to rage within 25 kilometres of Perth city. Although rain was predicted, it did not eventuate. Despite the dryness of the cool change, an easing of the winds allowed fire fighters to finally bring the flames under control. However, in all it is estimated that the fires burned a total of 4,400 square kilometres (1,700 sq mi) of bushland, and property damage far exceeded this.

Following the fires, a Royal Commission was conducted to investigate causes and in following years many recommendations were made to improve controlled burning in the tall eucalypt forests of the south-west.
