= Flinders Bay railway line =

Former railway line in Western Australia

Flinders Bay branch
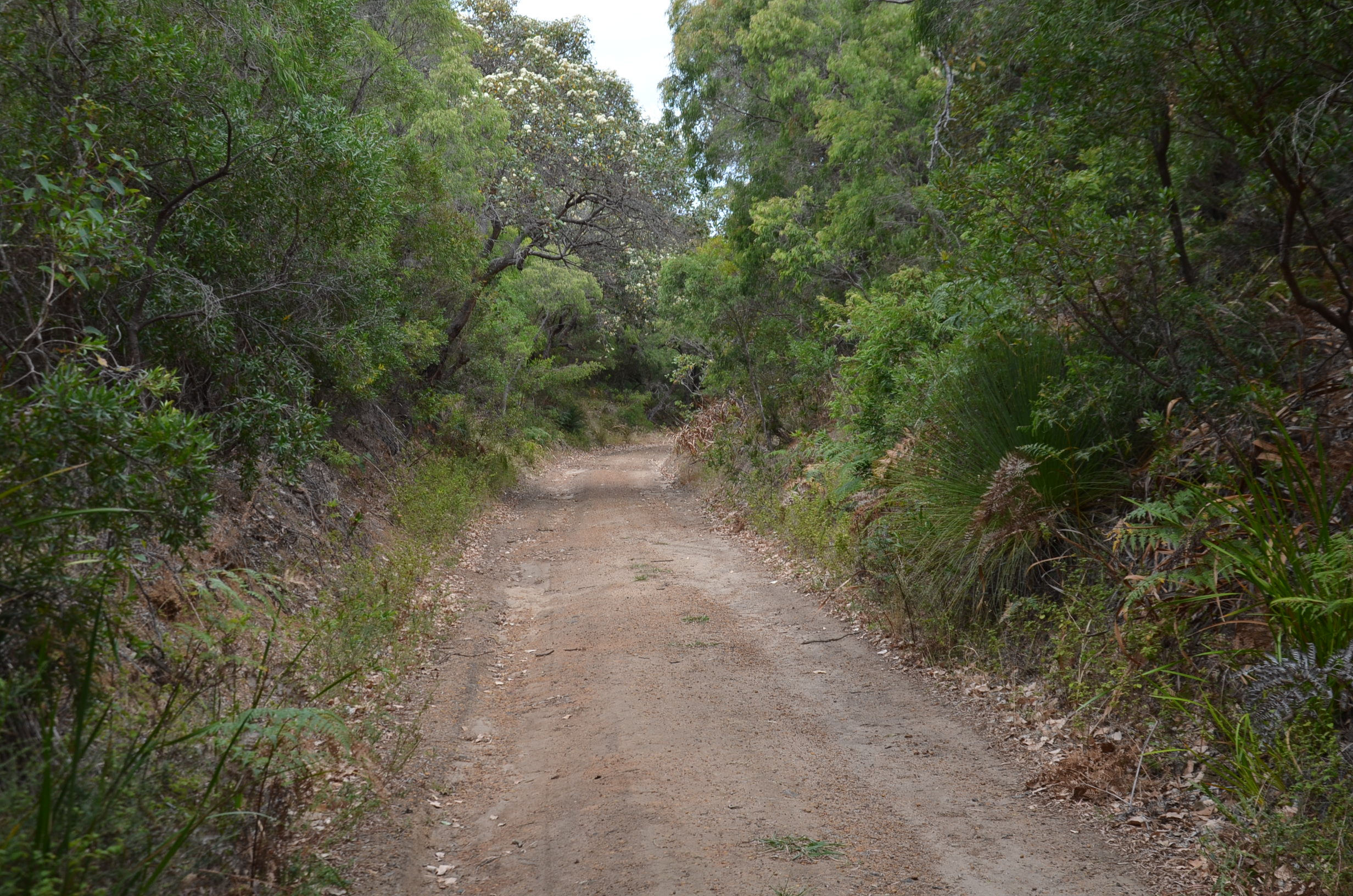
- Former rail line formation near Flinders Bay, 2018

Overview
- Owner: City of Busselton; Shire of Augusta–Margaret River
- Termini: Boyanup; Flinders Bay

History
- Opened: May 1884 (Karridale-Boranup) then in pieces until 1 April 1925 (Jarrahdene realignment)

Technical
- Line length: 151 km (94 mi)
- Track gauge: 1,067 mm (3 ft 6 in)

The Flinders Bay branch railway, also known as the Boyanup to Flinders Bay section ran between Boyanup and Flinders Bay, in South Western Western Australia. The section from Flinders Bay to Busselton has now been converted into a rail trail for bushwalkers and cyclists, called the Wadandi Trail.

== History ==
In May 1884, the first section of the line was opened between Karridale and Boranup, as part of the M.C. Davies Timber horse-drawn tramway system, which soon ran between the jetties at Hamelin Bay and Flinders Bay. Access to both jetties allowed timber to be loaded onto ships in all seasons, whereas the original west-facing Hamelin Bay jetty typically experienced poor conditions during the winter. Some parts of the system were originally constructed using wooden rails and involved steep grades, typical of the low-cost, rough workings of the timber tramway system. Steam locomotive haulage replaced horses from 1895 and, by 1900, the network stretched from Flinders Bay to Margaret River.

Following the opening of the Bunbury–Boyanup railway in 1891, a branch from Boyanup to Busselton was constructed by Smith & Tims, opening on 21 November 1894.

The railway between Margaret River and Flinders Bay was purchased by the Government in 1912, under the Flinders Bay-Margaret River Railway Act 1913, and was run as an isolated system by the Public Works Department for a few years. After some years with no service, the railway south of Witchcliffe was rehabilitated, including the construction of a new alignment north of Jarrahdene. It was formally taken over by the Western Australian Government Railways (WAGR) and opened for service on 1 April 1925. That followed the opening of the WAGR line between Busselton and Witchcliffe on 20 October 1924, along a new alignment between Margaret River and Witchcliffe.

Although a slow service due to the light rails and steep gradients, the branch was important for the dairy industry in the region. Usually known as the Flinders Bay branch, it ran until 1957. It was one of three branches in the WAGR system that relied on the important Msa garratt steam locomotive to move the loads over the steep gradients.

Most of the railway formation and structures were removed shortly before the closure of the line. The Flinders Bay engine shed, and some parts of the railway yard were not immediately removed and remained intact until the late 1950s. A limited number of photographs exist of the stopping platform at Flinders Bay, but very few exist of the Flinders Bay Jetty. At one stage in the 1970s, railway bus drivers could stay overnight in a small railway cottage/shed at the bay-side edge of the Flinders Bay yard.

== Alignment ==
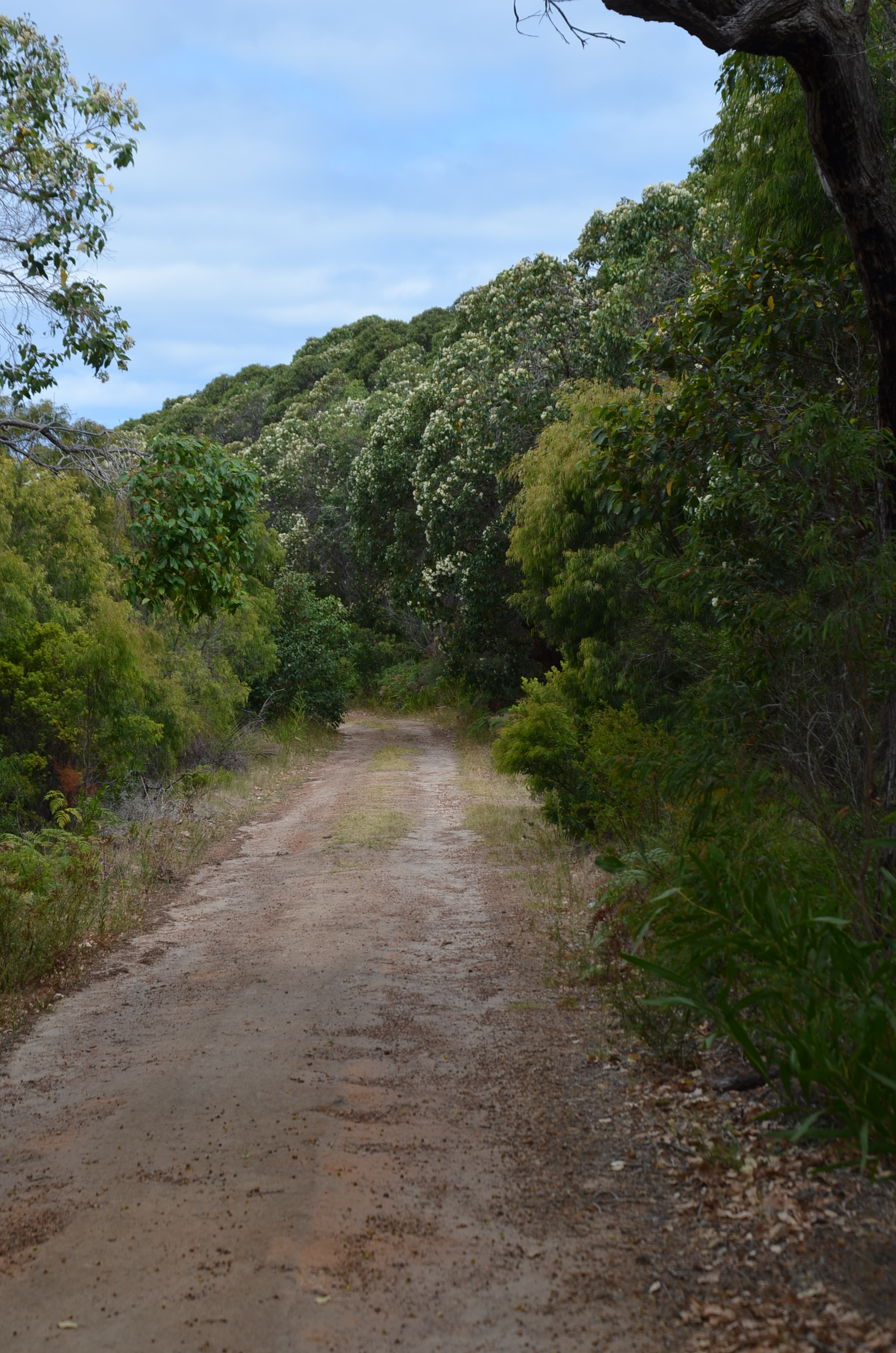
Former railway formation near Flinders Bay, 2018

As operated by the WAGR, the line was 93 miles 61 chains (93.76 miles, 150.90 km) from Boyanup to Flinders Bay. Only the first section of the line (Boyanup to RGC) remains in place, although disused, with few changes since it was last operated. The remainder of the line has been lifted, although the rail reserve as far as Busselton remains under the control of the Public Transport Authority and is theoretically available for future rail uses.

Like all railways outside of Perth, the line was predominantly single-track, with passing loops at various locations. The remnant section, from Boyanup to RGC, is controlled by Arc Infrastructure.

Heading south west from Boyanup, the line traverses predominantly agricultural land to a few kilometres beyond Capel, where it terminates at the former Iluka Resources RGC site. From there, the line continued through a mix of agricultural and forested land to Busselton. Part of the corridor west of Wonnerup has been used to accommodate the widening of the Bussell Highway. Within Busselton the line ran past the jetty and along the foreshore, turning south through what is now the Busselton Health Campus. Heading west again along the route of what is now the Bussell Highway, the line served Vasse and Quindalup before turning south towards Flinders Bay. The line passed through forested and agricultural areas, including several municipally heritage-registered mill sites in the M.C. Davies timber concession area south of Margaret River.

=== Branches ===
The first branch from the Northcliffe line, at Boyanup, linked Busselton to the WAGR network. The only WAGR line to branch from the line was the Nannup branch, which ran south from Wonnerup to Nannup. The section of the line from Wonnerup to Maryvale followed the alignment of Western Australia's first railway - the Ballaarat Tramway.

==== Timber tramways ====
Several timber mills used to operate along the railway, each with their own access to the main line. Many of those mills operated extensive timber tramways that fed significant quantities of timber to the railway. The section from Witchcliffe to Flinders Bay was originally built as a horse-drawn tramway by M.C. Davies, before being bought by the Government in 1925 and upgraded to a WAGR line.

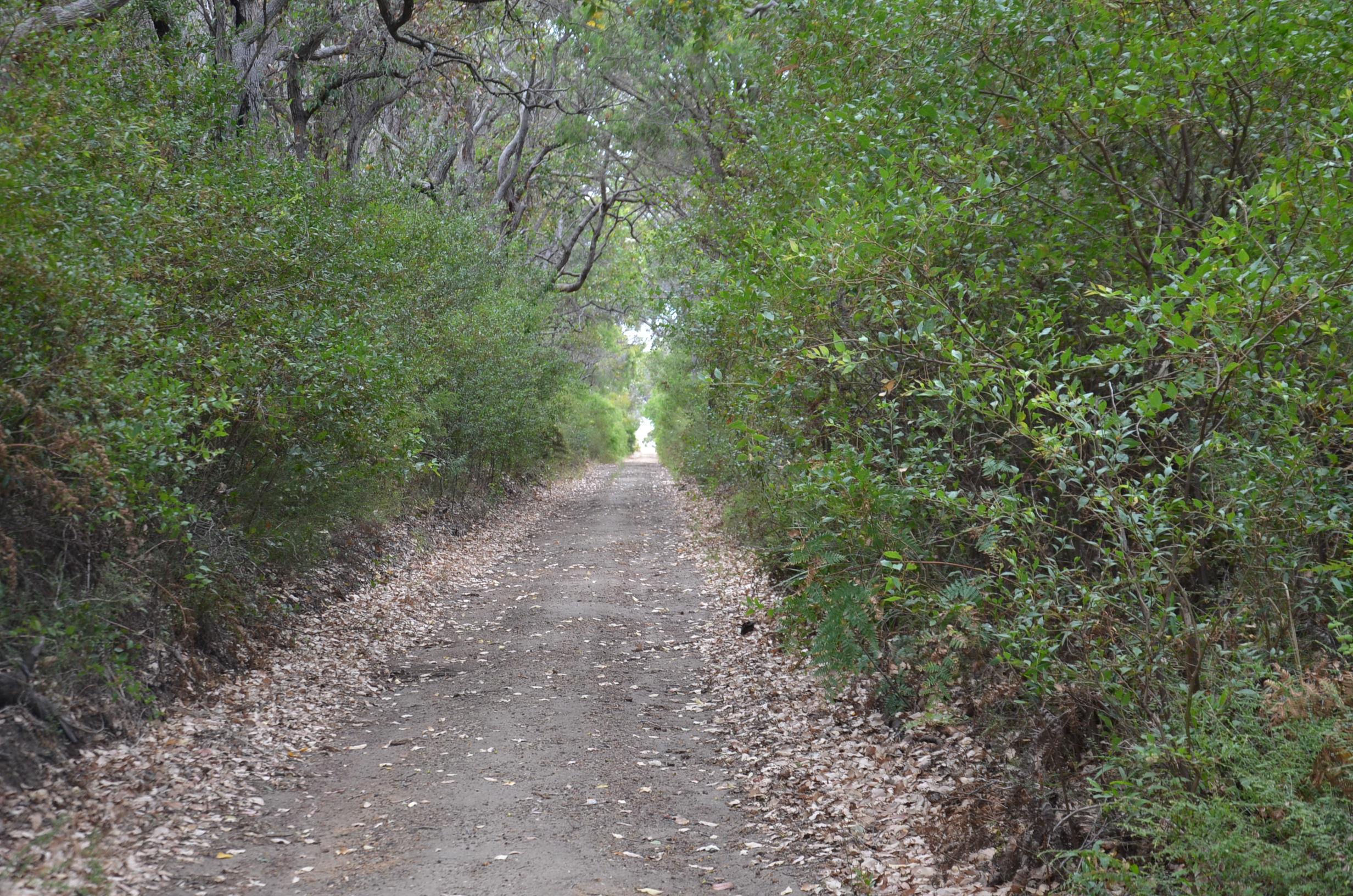
Former steep incline near Flinders Bay, 2018

== Wadandi track ==
In 2012, the Adelaide-based firm Mulloway created an interpretation plan for the Busselton to Flinders Bay Railway Rail Trail project, that converted the former railway right-of-way into a recreational, tourism, and educational trail. Initially, the track was called the Rails to Trails track.

The City of Busselton and the Shire of Augusta–Margaret River developed the rail alignment into the Wadandi Track Rail Trail, finishing on the Busselton foreshore. The sections from Busselton Jetty to the Carbunup River east of Marybrook and Cowaramup to Witchcliffe were completed in August 2020. The track takes its name from the traditional owners of the area, the Wadandi people, whose name means "people of the sea".

The trail is being extended from its current length of 54 km (34 mi) (across two separate sections) to the entire 109 km (68 mi) distance from Busselton to Flinders Bay, making it one of the longest rail trails in Australia. That is in line with the track being a core priority in the Leeuwin-Naturaliste 2050 Cycling Strategy, forming the primary cycle network spine between Busselton and Augusta.
