= Augusta, Western Australia =

Augusta
- Town
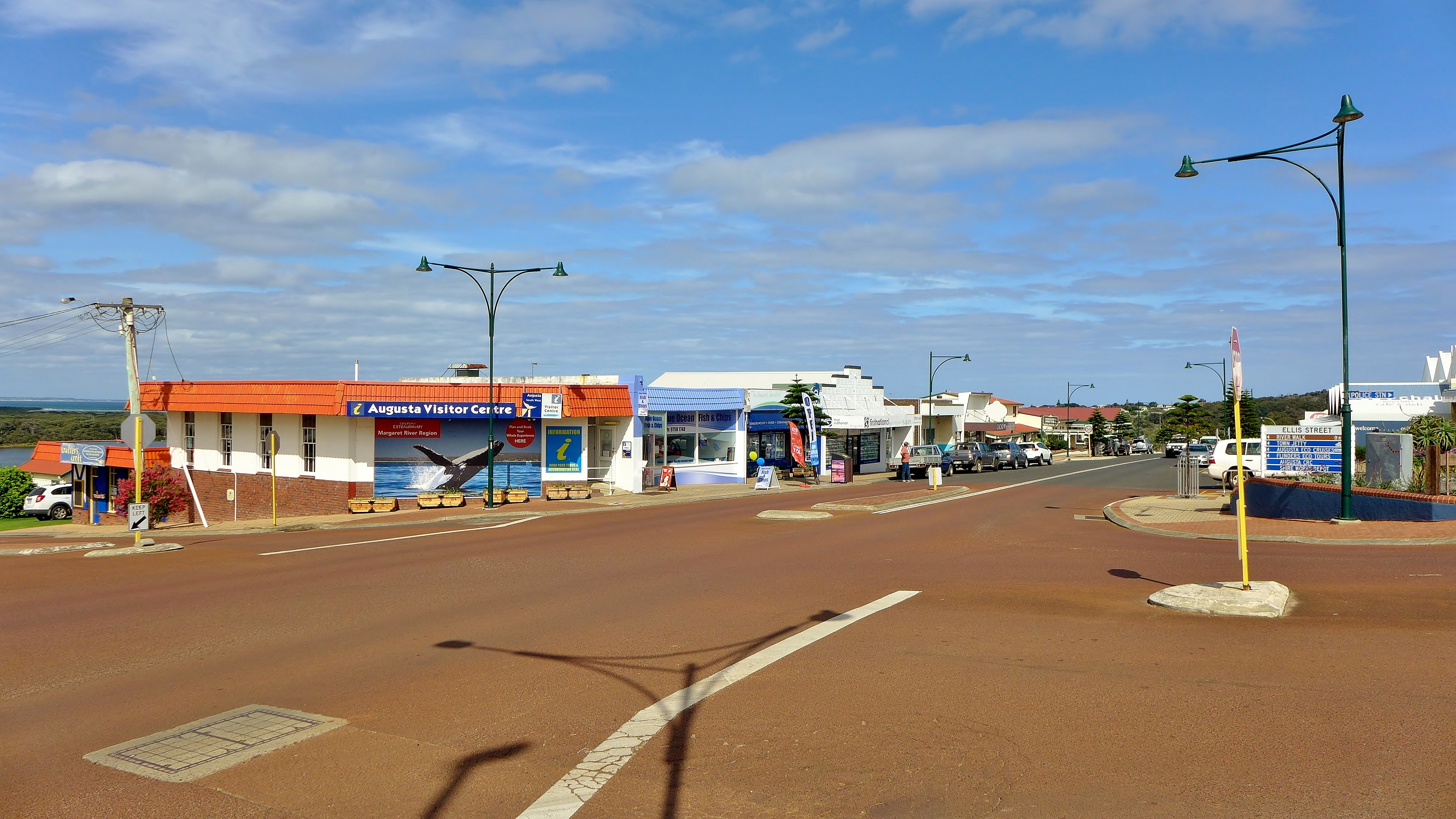
- Blackwood Avenue, Augusta, 2015

- Interactive map of Augusta
- Coordinates: 34.312°S 115.159°E
- Country: Australia
- State: Western Australia
- LGA: Shire of Augusta Margaret River
- Location: 322 km (200 mi) south of Perth; 146 km (91 mi) south of Bunbury; 169 km (105 mi) southwest of Manjimup
- Established: 1830

Government
  - State electorate: Warren-Blackwood
  - Federal division: Forrest

Area
  - Total: 37.8 km^{2} (14.6 sq mi)
- Elevation: 14 m (46 ft)

Population
  - Total: 1,211 (UCL 2021)
- Postcode: 6290
- Mean max temp: 19.7 °C (67.5 °F)
- Mean min temp: 14.1 °C (57.4 °F)
- Annual rainfall: 976.1 mm (38.43 in)

Augusta is a town on the south-west coast of Western Australia, where the Blackwood River flows into Flinders Bay. It is the nearest town to Cape Leeuwin, on the furthest southwest corner of the Australian continent. In the 2001 census it had a population of 1,091; by 2021 the population of the town was 1,211 (excluding East Augusta).

The town is within the Shire of Augusta Margaret River local government area, and is in the Leeuwin Ward. It is connected by public transport to Perth via Transwa coach service SW1. The town has its own airport.

Augusta was a summer holiday town for many during most of the twentieth century, but late in the 1990s many people chose to retire to the region for its cooler weather. As a consequence of this and rising land values in the Augusta-Margaret River area, the region has experienced significant social change.

== History ==
Noongar peoples, the Aboriginal Australian peoples of south-western Australia, inhabited the area for an estimated 45,000 years before the arrival of European settlers, with one site near Margaret River showing signs of human habitation around 47,000 years ago. Augusta lies within Wardandi land. Wardandi (often spelt Wadandi) traditional owners guided archaeological researchers to a spot on a granite outcrop near Flinders Bay which was excavated and reported on in 2021, revealing grooves and other signs that people ground stones to make tools here around 9,700 years ago.

The coastline near the Augusta area was first sighted by Europeans in March 1622 when the Dutch East India Company ship Leeuwin (Lioness) mapped and named the land north of Cape Leeuwin between Hamelin Bay and Point D'Entrecasteaux 't Landt van de Leeuwin. In 1801 Captain Matthew Flinders named the "south-western, and most projecting part of Leeuwin's Land" Cape Leeuwin.

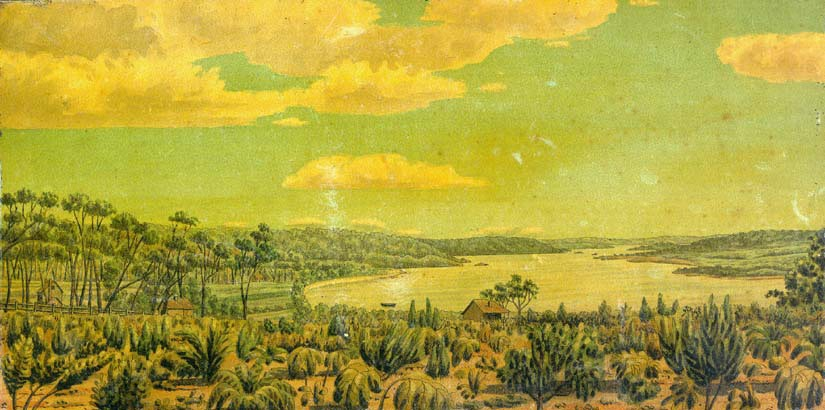
Painting of Augusta by Thomas Turner, 1830s.

Augusta was founded in 1830. In March of that year, a number of settlers, including John Molloy and members of the Bussell and Turner families, had arrived at the Swan River Colony on board Warrior. On their arrival the Lieutenant-Governor Captain James Stirling advised them that most of the good land near the Swan River had already been granted, and suggested that they form a new sub-colony in the vicinity of Cape Leeuwin.

The following month, Stirling sailed with a party of prospective settlers on board Emily Taylor. After arriving at the mouth of the Blackwood River, the party spent four days exploring the area. Stirling then confirmed his decision to establish a sub-colony, the settlers' property was disembarked, and the town of Augusta declared at the site.

Stirling named the town in honour of Prince Augustus Frederick, Duke of Sussex, the sixth son of George III, due to its location within Sussex County, one of the 26 counties of Western Australia that were designated in 1829 as cadastral divisions.

During the 1880s, an expansion of the timber industry occurred following the construction of a timber mill at nearby Kudardup and the completion of jetties at Hamelin Bay and Flinders Bay.

Augusta was a stopping place on the Busselton to Flinders Bay railway line (now converted into a walking and cycling trail named the Wadandi Track), which was government run from the 1920s to the 1950s. Prior to that M. C. Davies had a timber railway system that went to both Hamelin Bay and Flinders Bay jetties in the 1890s.

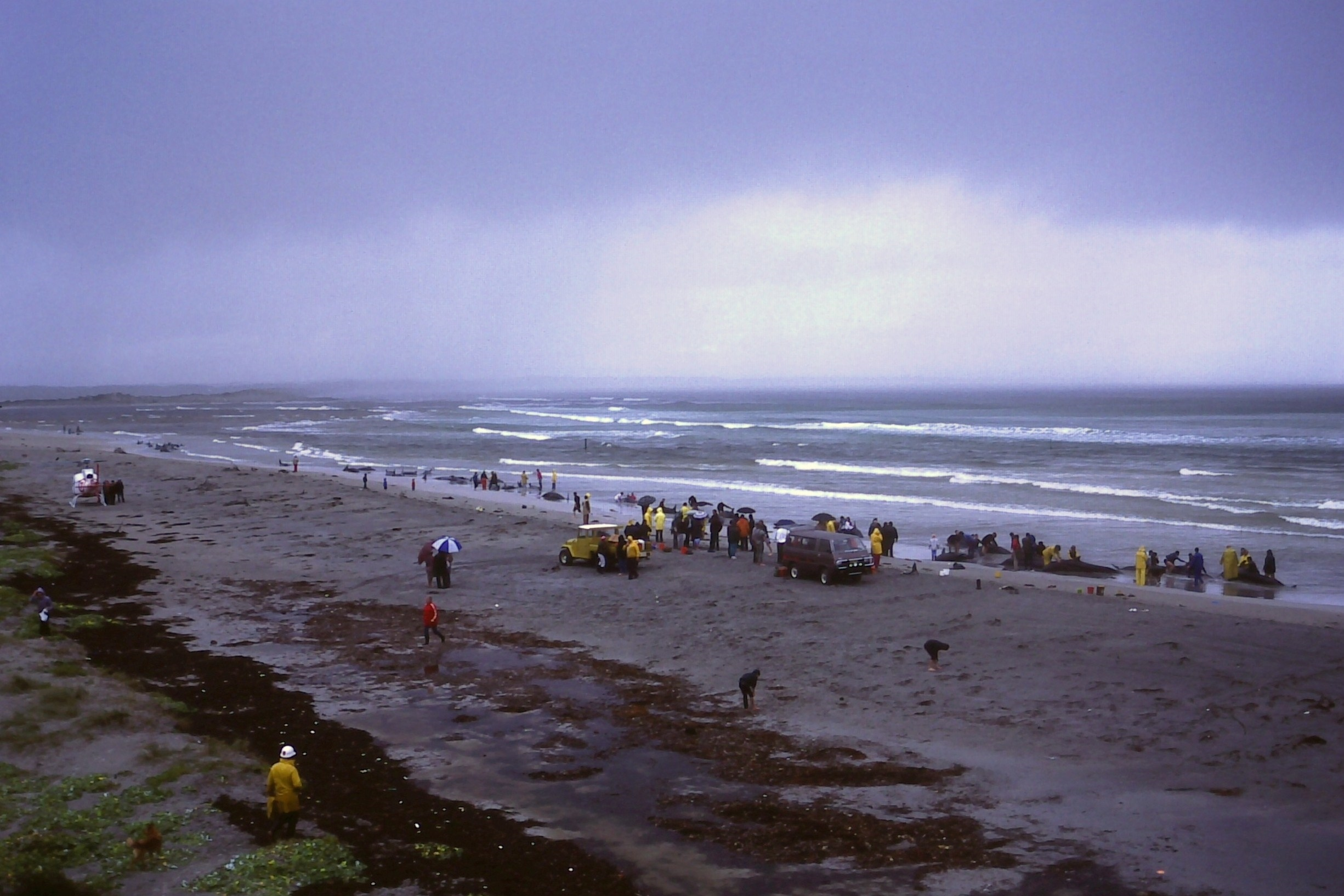
The Town Beach whale stranding, 1986.

On 30 July 1986, a pod of 114 false killer whales became stranded at Town Beach, Augusta. In a three-day operation, co-ordinated by the Department of Conservation & Land Management, volunteers from around Western Australia, including forestry workers, wildlife officers, surfers and townsfolk, carried 96 of the whales on trucks to more sheltered waters. The surviving whales were then successfully guided out into the bay, flanked by a flotilla of boats, board riders and swimmers. A memorial to the rescue now overlooks Town Beach. The Augusta boat harbour on the coast towards Cape Leeuwin has replaced a range of points where boats have operated from between the mouth of the Blackwood River around to the area of the former Flinders Bay jetties.

Many tourist websites and information conflate Augusta and Cape Leeuwin with features that exist nearby. The Augusta townsite now also includes the former separate Flinders Bay community at its southern end, where there had been a jetty, railway terminus, and whaling location. The new Augusta Boat Harbour to the south of Flinders Bay is well outside the townsite.

In 2009, 2 Oceans FM was set up at the Augusta Community Centre and began broadcasting on 97.1 MHz FM.

== Fires ==
In 1961, over 40,000 hectares (100,000 acres) of farms, bushland and forests between Margaret River and Augusta were destroyed by bushfires. Augusta was saved from these because a serious fire a few months earlier had created a low fuel zone north of the town. The Augusta residents cared for the school children who had been evacuated from Karridale and Kudardup.

A bushfire threatened the town in 2011 and over 200 residents were evacuated. The fire had already claimed 40,000 hectares (100,000 acres) before reaching the outskirts of East Augusta, but was later brought under control and no homes were destroyed.

In January 2018 the town was threatened by a bushfire.

== Tourism and culture ==
The CinefestOZ film festival stages some of its screenings and events in Augusta in late August each year.

== See also ==
- Cape Leeuwin Lighthouse
- Saint Alouarn Islands
- Wadandi Track, walking and cycling trail from Flinders Bay to Busselton
