= Kalgup, Western Australia =

Locality in the City of Busselton, Western Australia

Kalgup
- Suburb
- Interactive map of Kalgup
- Coordinates: 33.73°S 115.37°E
- Country: Australia
- State: Western Australia
- LGA: City of Busselton
- Location: 225 km (140 mi) from Perth; 9 km (5.6 mi) from Busselton

Government
  - State electorate: Vasse
  - Federal division: Forrest

Area
  - Total: 17 km^{2} (6.6 sq mi)

Population
  - Total: 91 (SAL 2021)
- Postcode: 6280
Suburbs around Kalgup
Ambergate	Bovell	Yalyalup
Ambergate	Kalgup	Yoongarillup
Chapman Hill	Acton Park	Sabina River

Kalgup is a rural locality of the City of Busselton in the South West region of Western Australia.

The City of Busselton and the locality of Kalgup are located on the traditional land of the Wardandi (also spelled Wadandi) people of the Noongar nation.

Kalgup was established as a Group Settlement with the group number 27 in August 1922.

From 1984 to 2018, the locality was home to the Vasse Research Station, an agricultural research station operated by the Western Australian Department of Agriculture and Food.
