= Reinscourt, Western Australia =

Locality in the City of Busselton, Western Australia

Reinscourt
- Suburb
- Interactive map of Reinscourt
- Coordinates: 33.65°S 115.40°E
- Country: Australia
- State: Western Australia
- LGA: City of Busselton
- Location: 216 km (134 mi) from Perth; 6 km (3.7 mi) from Busselton

Government
  - State electorate: Vasse
  - Federal division: Forrest

Area
  - Total: 8.6 km^{2} (3.3 sq mi)

Population
  - Total: 280 (SAL 2021)
- Postcode: 6280
Suburbs around Reinscourt
Busselton	Geographe	Wonnerup
Busselton	Reinscourt	Wonnerup
Bovell	Yalyalup	Yalyalup

Reinscourt is a semi-rural locality of the City of Busselton local government area in the South West region of Western Australia, located on the Vasse River south-east of the Busselton city centre. The southern border of the locality is formed by the Bussell Highway.

The City of Busselton and the locality of Reinscourt are located on the traditional land of the Wardandi (also spelled Wadandi) people of the Noongar nation.

The former Reinscourt Homestead was one of the earliest homesteads built in the area and belonged to the Bussell family.

The locality is home to the state heritage-listed Chapman's Mill, the first commercial flourmill built in Western Australia, dating back to the 1850s.
