= Walsall, Western Australia =

Locality in the City of Busselton, Western Australia

Walsall
- Suburb
- Coordinates: 33.79°S 115.37°E
- Country: Australia
- State: Western Australia
- LGA: City of Busselton
- Location: 236 km (147 mi) from Perth; 18 km (11 mi) from Busselton

Government
  - State electorate: Vasse
  - Federal division: Forrest

Area
  - Total: 23.2 km^{2} (9.0 sq mi)

Population
  - Total: 82 (SAL 2021)
- Postcode: 6280
Suburbs around Walsall
Chapman Hill	Acton Park	Yoganup
Chapman Hill	Walsall	Yoganup
Baudin	Baudin	Baudin

Walsall is a rural locality of the City of Busselton in the South West region of Western Australia. In the east, the locality borders Whicher National Park.

The City of Busselton and the locality of Walsall are located on the traditional land of the Wardandi (also spelled Wadandi) people of the Noongar nation.
