= Siesta Park, Western Australia =

Locality in the City of Busselton, Western Australia

Siesta Park
- Suburb
- Coordinates: 33.65°S 115.21°E
- Country: Australia
- State: Western Australia
- LGA: City of Busselton
- Location: 235 km (146 mi) from Perth; 12 km (7.5 mi) from Busselton

Government
  - State electorate: Vasse
  - Federal division: Forrest

Area
  - Total: 0.9 km^{2} (0.35 sq mi)

Population
  - Total: 60 (SAL 2021)
- Postcode: 6280
Suburbs around Siesta Park
	Geographe Bay
Marybrook	Siesta Park	Abbey
Marybrook	Kealy	Abbey

Siesta Park is a locality of the City of Busselton in the South West region of Western Australia. Siesta Park is located on a thin strip of land between Caves Road, which forms its southern border, and Geographe Bay to the north. It shares its name with a resort/holiday area that was named after a World War II-era launch named Siesta that belonged to a previous owner of the property. The area became a locality because the property's petrol station and general store was also used as a post office until the mid-1980s.

The City of Busselton and the locality of Siesta Park are located on the traditional land of the Wardandi (also spelled Wadandi) people of the Noongar nation.
