= Sabina River, Western Australia =

Locality in the City of Busselton, Western Australia

Sabina River
- Suburb
- Coordinates: 33.75°S 115.43°E
- Country: Australia
- State: Western Australia
- LGA(s): City of Busselton
- Location: 226 km (140 mi) from Perth; 16 km (9.9 mi) from Busselton

Government
  - State electorate(s): Vasse
  - Federal division(s): Forrest

Area
  - Total: 18.5 km^{2} (7.1 sq mi)

Population
  - Total(s): 79 (SAL 2021)
- Postcode: 6280
Suburbs around Sabina River
Kalgup	Yoongarillup	Hithergreen
Acton Park	Sabina River	Hithergreen
Acton Park	Yoganup	Yoganup

Sabina River is a rural locality of the City of Busselton in the South West region of Western Australia, located along the Sabina River, north of the Whicher National Park.

The City of Busselton and the locality of Sabina River are located on the traditional land of the Wardandi (also spelled Wadandi) people of the Noongar nation.

Sabina River was established as a Group Settlement with the group number 36 in November 1922.
