= List of heritage places in Busselton =

List of heritage places in Busselton is a list of important places within the City of Busselton as defined by the Western Australian Governments State Heritage Office.

== List ==
Building	SHO number	Built	Notes	Image
Keyser's Cottage	02947	1853	Demolished 1999	
Old Butter Factory	03568	1918	currently a museum and home of the Busselton Historical Society	
Ship Hotel & Barn	00420	1857, 1910	Multiple buildings, currently hotel with accommodation	
Prospect Villa	00389	1855	Built by James Chapman, oldest surviving house in Busselton	
St Davitt's	02936	1896, 1903	Built for Frederick Cammilleri, discovered gold at Brown Hill, Kalgoorlie	
The Retreat (Barnard's House)	00422	1890	Multiple uses over time, residence of George Barnard	
Weld Hall Theatre	00404	1874	Mechanics Institute, RSL, Repertory theatre	
Fairlawn Dwelling	08696			
Busselton Jetty	00423	1865–1911	1841 metres in length, damage by Cyclone Alby	
Broadwater Wetlands	13487		freshwater wetlands important nesting site, protected by EPA	
St Mary's Anglican Church and Graveyard	00402; 18161	1845, 1852; 1902, 1906	built in stages church, Harmonium, bell tower, vestry John Bussell from whom the area takes its name is buried in the Graveyard	
St Mary's Anglican Church rectory	18163	1895	Built in 1895 there are suggestions that it wasn't occupied until 1906	
St Joseph's Roman Catholic Church Precinct	00409	1933, 1971	Built in 1933 during The Great Depression to replace the former 1866 building renovated in 1971	
St Joseph's Church (fmr)	00400	1866–68	former church incorporated into shopping complex and youth centre	
Villa Carlotta	00386	1896–1904	Convent until sold 1952, since 1952 hotel accommodation	
Old Busselton Cemetery	00406	1847 to 1932		
Armstrong Cottage	02929	c1890	Cottage ornée style and former maternity hospital	
Busselton Court House and Police Complex	00401	1860 to 1900	now part of the ArtGeo Cultural Complex	
Bovell's Cottage	00385	1882	owned by Joseph Bovell early settler in Busselton area	
Site of Bryant Memorial Hall	00396	1873, 1985	Demolished and rebuilt in 1985 incorporating materials from the original building	
The Gulch Police Residence, Bond Store & Custom Officer's Residence	00395	1856		
Wonnerup Precinct	00424	1837, 1859; 1873, 1875	includes Wonnerup house, Wonnerup School, Teachers cottage	
Vasse-Wonnerup Wetlands	05376	1990	Ramsar site 484.	
Office of the Department of Agriculture	00405	1831	Also called Agricultural Bank of Western Australia and Agriculture Western Australia	
Lady Campion Hostel	05299	1926	Bush hospital until 1947, in private ownership since	
Slab Cottage Group, Quindalup	03478	1860	also called Old Quindalup Post Office, Harwoods Cafe, Inlet Villa, Beach Station	
Wonnerup Floodgates	05376	1907, 2004	gates built 1907, replaced 2004	
Ballarat Bridge & Vasse Floodgates	05376	1871, 1907, 2004	Bridge built in 1871, gates in 1907 both demolished 2004 though the gates were replaced Ballarat bridge derives its name from the first steam engine that operated on the line	
Ballarat Engine, Victoria Square	05381	1871	first steam locomotive to operate in Western Australia	
Busselton War Memorial	13481	1919–20	crafted by Pietro Porcelli	
