= Yallingup Siding, Western Australia =

Locality in the City of Busselton, Western Australia

Yallingup Siding
- Suburb
- Interactive map of Yallingup Siding
- Coordinates: 33.69°S 115.10°E
- Country: Australia
- State: Western Australia
- LGA: City of Busselton
- Location: 247 km (153 mi) from Perth; 28 km (17 mi) from Busselton; 33 km (21 mi) from Margaret River

Government
  - State electorate: Vasse
  - Federal division: Forrest

Area
  - Total: 20.2 km^{2} (7.8 sq mi)
- Elevation: 66 m (217 ft)

Population
  - Total: 324 (SAL 2021)
- Postcode: 6282
Suburbs around Yallingup Siding
Quindalup	Quindalup	Quindalup
Yallingup	Yallingup Siding	Carbunup River
Yallingup	Yelverton	Yelverton

Yallingup Siding is a rural locality of the City of Busselton in the South West region of Western Australia. In the south-west, the locality borders Yelverton National Park.

The Yallingup Siding School was open from 1925 to 1945.

The railway line on which the siding existed from the 1920s to the 1950s, the Flinders Bay branch railway, was the location of a railway derailment in the Yallingup Siding area in 1928.

The City of Busselton and the locality of Yallingup Siding are located on the traditional land of the Wardandi (also spelled Wadandi) people of the Noongar nation.
