= Bussell Highway =

Highway in the South West region of Western Australia

Bussell Highway Western Australia
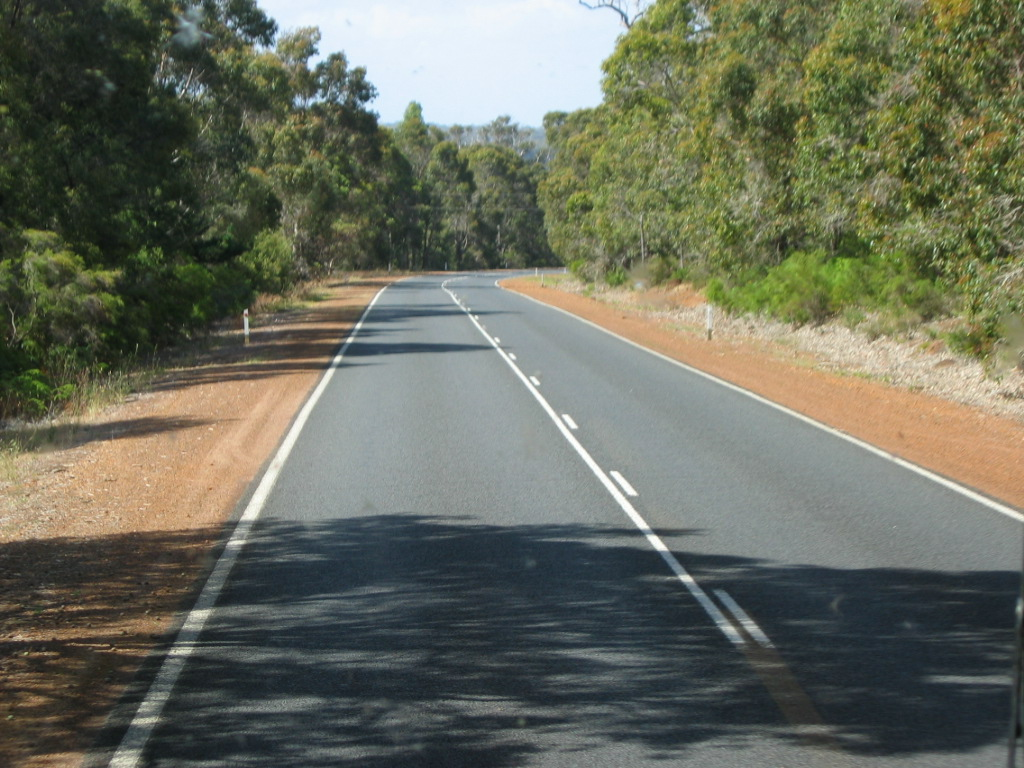
- Bussell Highway in Forest Grove

General information
- Type: Highway
- Length: 140 km (87 mi)
- Opened: 1894
- Route number(s): State Route 10 (excluding Busselton to Vasse and through Margaret River

Major junctions
- North end: Blair Street, Bunbury
- Robertson Drive (State Route 10); Vasse Highway (State Route 104); Brockman Highway (State Route 10)
- South end: Blackwood Avenue, Augusta

Location(s)
- Major settlements: Capel, Busselton, Vasse, Cowaramup, Margaret River, Karridale

Highway system
- Highways in Australia; National Highway • Freeways in Australia; Highways in Western Australia

Bussell Highway is a generally north–south highway in the South West region of Western Australia. The highway links the city of Bunbury with the town of Augusta and is approximately 140 kilometres (87 mi) in length. The highway is signed State Route 10, except in Busselton where the construction of the Busselton Bypass in 2000 resulted in this stretch being changed to Alternate State Route 10 with the Bypass signed State Route 10; as well as in Margaret River where the construction of the Perimeter Road in 2018 resulted in the latter road being signed State Route 10 with the original stretch now unsigned.

The highway is sealed dual carriageway from Bunbury to Capel and in the town of Busselton; and is single carriageway from Capel to Busselton and from Vasse to Augusta with regular overtaking lanes.

== History ==
Bussell Highway was built in 1894 after successful lobbying by M. C. Davies, a timber miller, as a road connecting Busselton with his mill at Karridale. The tender had been let to Davies by the State government under John Forrest. In 1932, the road from Busselton to Augusta was completed and named Bussell Highway after the Bussell family, some of the region's first settlers, on the suggestion of Premier James Mitchell in consultation with historian James Battye; the name, which incorporated a portion of Quindalup Road, was announced on 8 April of that year to coincide with Busselton's centenary celebrations. In 1946 Bunbury Road and Vasse Road were incorporated into Bussell highway, thus extending the highway to Bunbury. By the early 1960s, the road had been completely sealed. In 1995, the Ludlow deviation, a replacement of part of the highway that bypasses the Tuart Forest National Park, was opened; the old route through the forest is now named Tuart Drive. The Busselton Bypass was completed in December 2000, while the Vasse bypass was completed in January 2016.

In 2016, Main Roads asked the local government Shire of Capel to clear land along the final stretch for the proposed dual carriageway between Capel and Busselton.

In 2019, the Perimeter Road, which diverts heavy traffic from Bussell Highway around, rather than through, Margaret River, was completed.

In 2020, funding was brought forward for the dual carriageway to support jobs during the COVID-19 pandemic. The south-bound section of the first of two stages, between Capel and Hutton Road, was opened in December 2021.

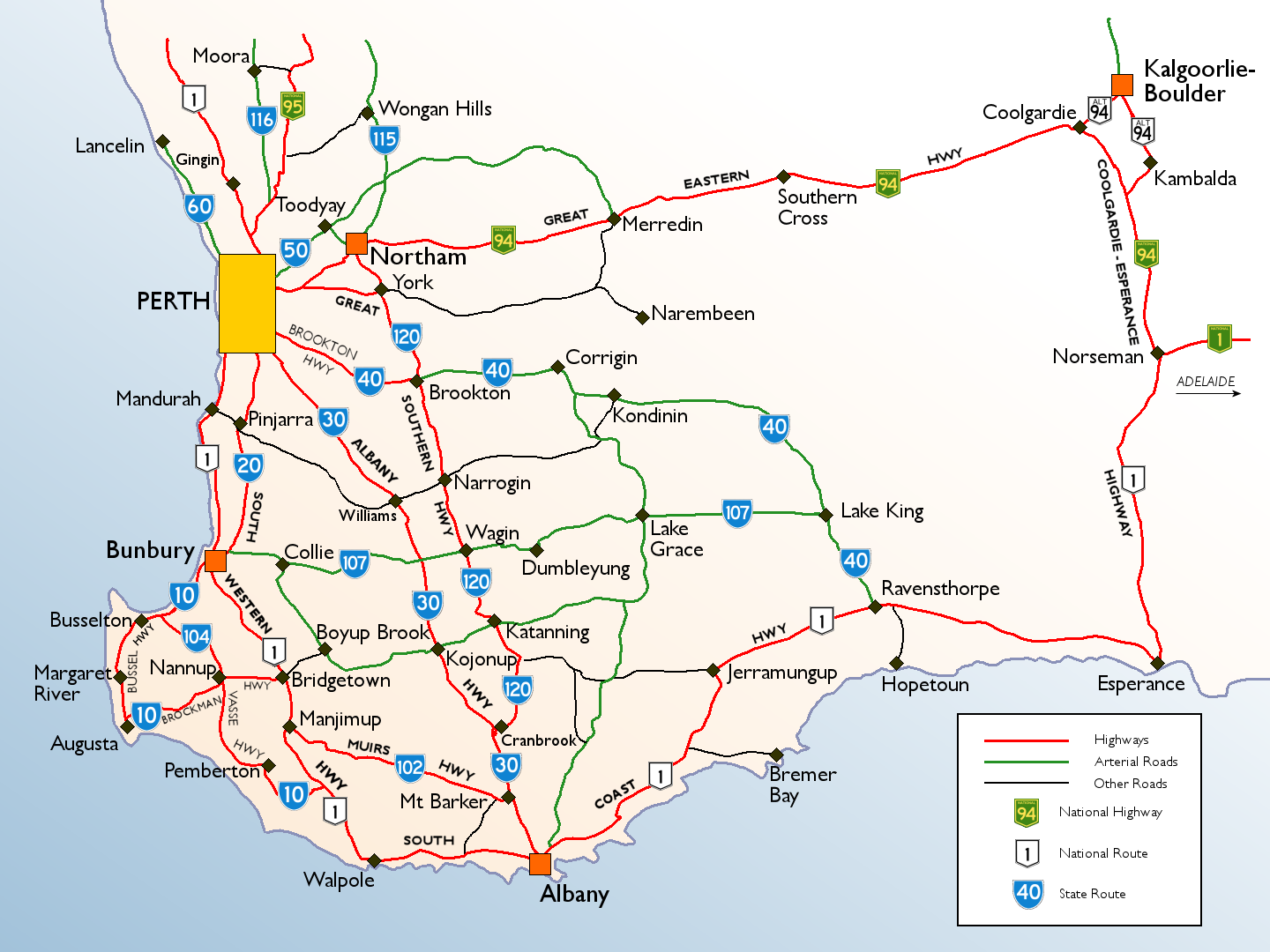
Bussell Highway and surrounding highways

== Route description ==
Departing Bunbury, the highway commences at the intersection of Blair Street and Parade Road outside the Bunbury Racecourse in Carey Park. After about 500 metres (1,600 ft), it intersects at a large roundabout with Bunbury's ring road, Robertson Drive, connecting the highway to several major routes: Australind Bypass and Forrest Highway lead to Perth via Mandurah; South Western Highway north-eastbound to Harvey, and to Collie via Coalfields Highway; and South Western Highway south-westbound to Donnybrook.

It exits Bunbury as a sealed dual carriageway, bypassing the town of Capel before becoming a single carriageway to Busselton. This section was considered the most dangerous road in regional Western Australia according to a 2019 survey by the Royal Automobile Club of Western Australia.

At a large roundabout, it intersects with the Busselton Bypass and changes its name to Causeway Road, then turns left into Albert Street in Busselton's CBD. After one block it reverts to Bussell Highway, proceeding for 9 kilometres (6 mi) as a dual carriageway through Busselton's western suburbs before turning left at Abbey. The road then proceeds as a single carriageway with regular overtaking lanes to Augusta through small dairy and crop farms, orchards and wineries – the only slow point on this entire journey is when it becomes the main street of the popular tourist and seachange town of Margaret River. The linked Perimeter Road bypasses the town.

The highway ends at the entrance to Augusta, but the road continues as Blackwood Avenue through the town and then as Leeuwin Road for 9 kilometres (6 mi) before reaching Cape Leeuwin, the southwestern tip of Western Australia.

== Major towns ==
- Gelorup
- Capel (bypass)
- Busselton
- Broadwater
- Carbunup River
- Cowaramup
- Margaret River
- Witchcliffe
- Karridale
- Kudardup
- Augusta

== Major intersections ==
LGA	Location	km	mi	Destinations	Notes
Bunbury	Carey Park, South Bunbury	0	0.0	Blair Street north / Nuytsia Avenue east – Bunbury city centre	Northern highway terminus: continues as Blair Street
Bunbury	Carey Park, Withers, College Grove	1.4	0.87	Robertson Drive (State Route 10) – Perth	Roundabout intersection; State Route 10 northern concurrency terminus: continues east
Capel	Dalyellup, Gelorup	5.1	3.2	Norton Promenade – Dalyellup	Traffic light controlled intersection
Capel	Dalyellup, Gelorup	10.3	6.4	Wilman Wadandi Highway north (State Route 101 – Picton, Australind	Partial-Y interchange with northbound exit and southbound entry only
Capel	Stratham	14.6	9.1	Boyanup West Road – Boyanup	
Capel	Capel	23.2	14.4	Capel Drive – Capel, Donnybrook	Northern loop road intersection
Capel	Capel	24.5	15.2	Capel Drive – Capel, Donnybrook	Southern loop road intersection
Capel	Capel	28.3	17.6	Tuart Drive (Ludlow Tuart Forest Tourist Drive) – Busselton (alternate route)	Old Bussell Highway route; Bussell Highway southbound is the main route to Busselton
Busselton	Yalyalup	41.9	26.0	Sues Road – Nannup, Pemberton, Augusta	
Busselton	Yalyalup	43.5	27.0	Tuart Drive (Ludlow Tuart Forest Tourist Drive) – Capel (alternate route)	Bussell Highway northbound is the main route to Capel
Busselton	Yalyalup, Bovell, Reinscourt	46.9	29.1	Vasse Highway (State Route 104) – Nannup, Pemberton	Access to Busselton Margaret River Airport
Busselton	Bovell, Reinscourt, Busselton	47.8	29.7	Busselton Bypass (State Route 10) south / Causeway Road (Bussell Highway) east – Dunsborough, Margaret River, Augusta, Busselton town centre	Roundabout intersection; State Route 10 concurrency terminus: continues south
Busselton	Busselton	49.7	30.9	Albert Street (Bussell Highway) west / Causeway Road (Bussell Highway) south / Albert Street east / Queen Street north – Busselton town centre	Traffic light controlled intersection
Busselton	Abbey	57.7	35.9	Caves Road to Caves Road Tourist Drive (Tourist Drive 250) – Dunsborough, Yallingup	Roundabout intersection
Busselton	Vasse	59.4	36.9	Busselton Bypass (State Route 10) east – Capel, Bunbury	Roundabout intersection; State Route 10 concurrency terminus: continues east
Augusta–Margaret River	Cowaramup	87.2	54.2	Cowaramup Bay Road – Gracetown	
Augusta–Margaret River	Bramley	94.9	59.0	Perimeter Road (State Route 10) - Margaret River Airport	Roundabout intersection; State Route 10 concurrency terminus: continues south
Augusta–Margaret River	Margaret River	97.4	60.5	Wallcliffe Road west / Forrest Street east – Prevelly	
Augusta–Margaret River	Margaret River	100.8	62.6	Perimeter Road (State Route 10) - Margaret River Airport	Roundabout intersection; State Route 10 concurrency terminus: continues south
Augusta–Margaret River	Karridale	126	78	Brockman Highway (State Route 10) – Nannup	State Route 10 also continues south along Bussell Highway to Augusta as a spur route
Augusta–Margaret River	Augusta	140	87	Blackwood Avenue North – Augusta Hospital	Highway terminus: Continues south as Blackwood Avenue towards Cape Leeuwin; State Route 10 southern terminus
1.000 mi = 1.609 km; 1.000 km = 0.621 mi: Concurrency terminus; Incomplete access; Route transition

== See also ==
- Highways in Australia
- List of highways in Western Australia
