= Caves Road =

Caves Road may refer to:

- Caves Road (Maryland), a road in Baltimore County
- Caves Road (Western Australia), a road in the state's South West region
