= Geographe, Western Australia =

Suburb of Busselton, Western Australia

Geographe
- Suburb
- Coordinates: 33°38′S 115°22′E
- Country: Australia
- State: Western Australia
- City: Busselton
- LGA(s): City of Busselton
- Location: 4 km (2.5 mi) from Busselton

Government
  - State electorate(s): Vasse
  - Federal division(s): Forrest

Area
  - Total: 6 km^{2} (2.3 sq mi)

Population
  - Total(s): 3,622 (SAL 2021)
- Time zone: UTC+8 (AWST)
- Postcode: 6280

Geographe is a suburb of the Western Australian city of Busselton. At the 2021 census, it had a population of 3,622.

Sandylands, one of the first houses built in Busselton, was constructed in the area beginning in 1840 by Charles Bussell, the younger brother of John Bussell. Geographe was developed as an urban area in the mid-1990s, with the Port Geographe Marina, which was opened in 1997, being constructed as part of the development. The suburb was established in 1998, being made up of the old East Busselton locality and parts of Wonnerup. Busselton Primary School was moved from the town centre to Geographe in that year, while Geographe Primary School was opened in the nearby suburb of Bovell in 2002. The construction of the marina caused seaweed to be trapped at the west of the development during winter, generating piles of the plants up to 2.5 metres (8 ft) high that rendered the beach unusable and resulted in health problems due to the hydrogen sulphide (rotten egg) smell; erosion also occurred at nearby Wonnerup Beach to the east due to the new marina. Therefore, from 2013 to 2015 the government Department of Transport funded works that reconfigured the port structures to reduce the severity of the seaweed accumulation and erosion. Since 2020, further works, such as ploughing channels in the seaweed, have been undertaken, which have significantly reduced the seagrass accumulation and reset it to a state closer to the way it was before the construction of the marina; by November 2020, the local beach was completely cleared of sea-grass for the first time since the marina was constructed.
