= Busselton (suburb) =

Central suburb of Busselton, Western Australia

- Suburb
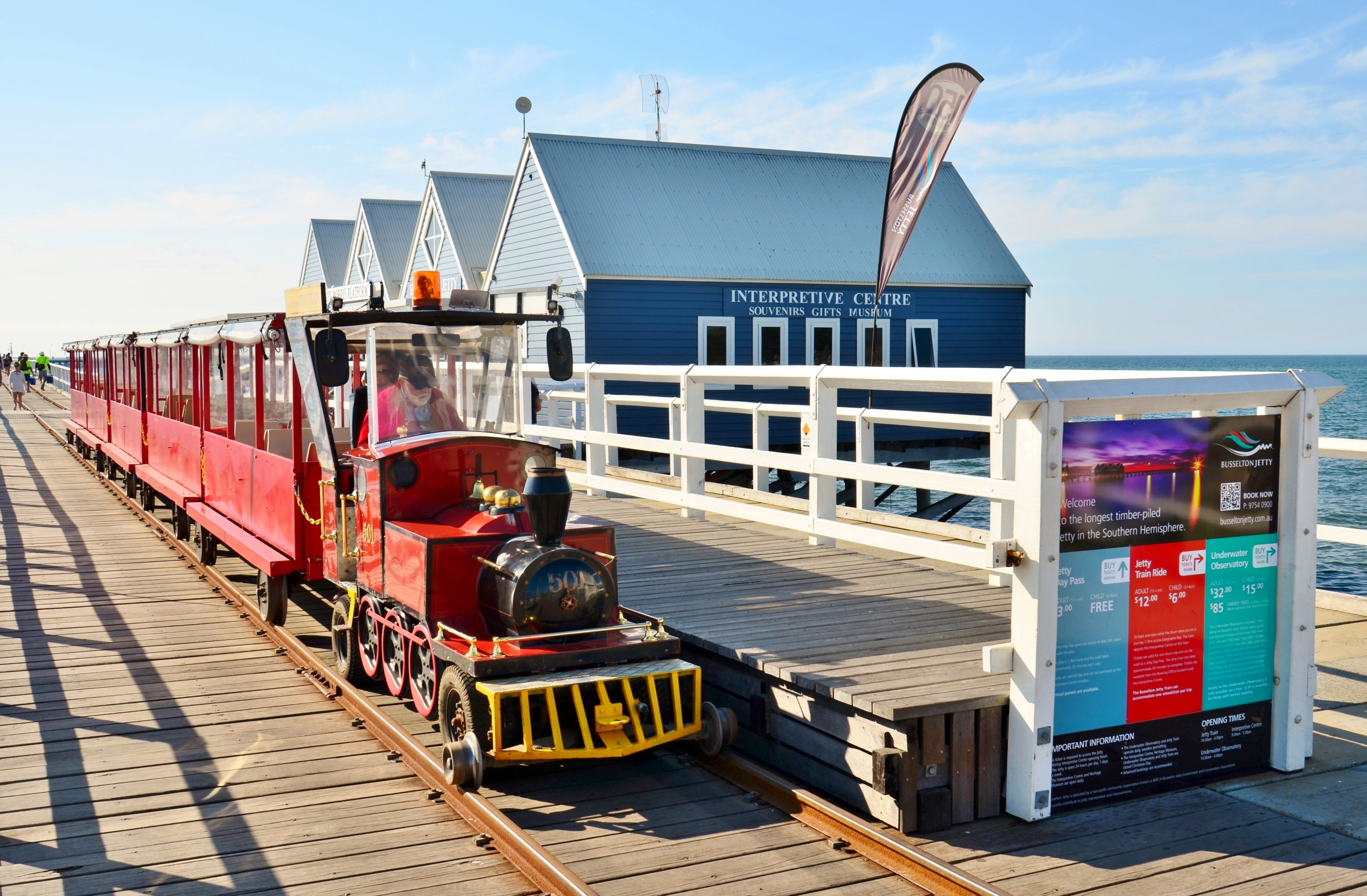
- Busselton Jetty, located within the suburb

- Coordinates: 33°39′S 115°20′E
- Country: Australia
- State: Western Australia
- City: Busselton
- LGA(s): City of Busselton

Government
  - State electorate(s): Vasse
  - Federal division(s): Forrest

Area
  - Total: 4.5 km^{2} (1.7 sq mi)

Population
  - Total(s): 1,838 (SAL 2021)
- Time zone: UTC+8 (AWST)
- Postcode: 6280

Busselton is the central suburb of the city of Busselton in Western Australia's South West region. At the 2021 census, it had a population of 1,838.
