= Kealy, Western Australia =

Suburb of Busselton, Western Australia

Kealy
- Suburb
- Coordinates: 33°40′S 115°13′E
- Country: Australia
- State: Western Australia
- City: Busselton
- LGA(s): City of Busselton
- Location: 12 km (7.5 mi) from Busselton

Government
  - State electorate(s): Vasse
  - Federal division(s): Forrest

Area
  - Total: 6.5 km^{2} (2.5 sq mi)

Population
  - Total(s): 1,119 (SAL 2021)
- Time zone: UTC+8 (AWST)
- Postcode: 6280

Kealy is a suburb of the Western Australian city of Busselton. At the 2021 census, it had a population of 1,119.

The Australian Broadcasting Corporation has a radio transmitter there. The area is being developed for residential uses relating to the nearby suburb of Vasse. On 1 August 2023, the boundary between Kealy and Vasse was moved north to Bussell Highway for easier recognition.
