= Quindalup =

- Town
- Interactive map of Quindalup
- Coordinates: 33°40′01″S 115°08′42″E
- Country: Australia
- State: Western Australia
- LGA: City of Busselton
- Location: 250 km (160 mi) WSW of Perth; 21 km (13 mi) W of Busselton
- Established: 1899

Government
  - State electorate: Vasse
  - Federal division: Forrest

Area
  - Total: 39.9 km^{2} (15.4 sq mi)
- Elevation: 4 m (13 ft)

Population
  - Total: 1,488 (SAL 2021)
- Postcode: 6281

Quindalup is a townsite and locality in the South West region of Western Australia. It is situated along Caves Road between Busselton and Dunsborough on Geographe Bay.

At the 2021 census, Quindalup had a population of 1,488.

The area was the site of one of the earliest timber industries in the state. Several timber mills were constructed in the area and the products were exported utilising a jetty that had been constructed on the coast in the 1860s. The first recorded use of the name was on a timber mill owned by Henry Yelverton and McGibbon. Land was reserved by the government in the 1870s and in 1899 local fishermen petitioned for a town to be declared along the beach front. Lots were surveyed the same year and the town was gazetted in 1899.

The name is Aboriginal in origin and means place of the Quenda.

The town was situated close to a shallow inlet, where the jetty was built, which was used to load timber sent up by a tramway, to boats that would ferry the timber to boats anchored a few kilometres offshore.

The only parts of the original settlement that are left are a slab cottage group, known as Harwoods Cottage, which was constructed around 1860 and associated with the original timber mill. The cottage group is composed of a cottage, gaol, post office, telephone exchange and Customs House. The buildings were almost derelict until restorations planned in 1998, commenced in 2000 and the operation was opened for business in 2000 with accommodation opening in 2004.
