= John Bussell =

Australian politician

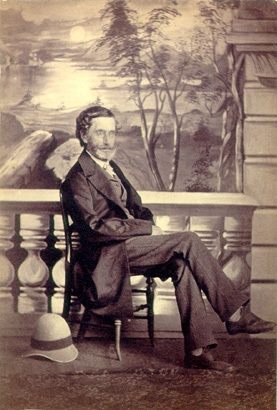
An 1840s studio portrait of John Garrett Bussell

John Garrett Bussell (16 August 1803 – 17 September 1875) was an early settler in Western Australia. Born at Portsea, Portsmouth, Hampshire in England on 16 August 1803, Bussell was educated at Winchester College in England. After the death of his father, the family decided to emigrate to Western Australia, and Bussell and three of his brothers sailed for Western Australia on board Warrior late in 1829, with the rest of the Bussell family to follow once the brothers were established.

On arriving at the Swan River Colony in March 1830, the Bussell brothers were advised that most of the good land near the Swan River had already been granted. James Stirling, the Governor of Western Australia, suggested they instead join with a number of other families in joining a new sub-colony at Augusta. The following month, Stirling sailed with a party of prospective settlers on board Emily Taylor. After arriving at the mouth of the Blackwood River, the party spent four days exploring the area. Stirling then confirmed his decision to establish a subcolony, the settlers' property was disembarked, and the town of Augusta declared at the site.

For four years the brothers tried unsuccessfully to establish a farm, initially at Augusta and then further up the Blackwood River. The brothers had immense difficulty clearing the land, and found the soil not particularly good for farming. John Bussell conducted numerous exploring expeditions in search of better land. He was particularly impressed with the quality of land at Busselton (then known as the Vasse), and explored the area thoroughly. When the Bussell's home was destroyed by fire in 1834, the family re-established themselves at the Vasse, where they became successful and prosperous farmers. John Bussell would remain at the homestead Cattle Chosen, now in Bovell, until his death.

John Bussell returned to England in 1837, with the intention of marrying his sweetheart Sophie Hayward. His relationship with her soured while he was in England, and their engagement was called off. However shortly afterwards Bussell met a widow named Charlotte Cookworthy (sister-in-law of Joseph Cookworthy), to whom he became engaged three weeks later. After marrying her in August 1838, they returned to Western Australia in 1839.

It is known that John Bussell in February 1841 was directly involved in the murder of seven Aboriginal people (after a dispute over pay resulted in the death of English farmer George Layman) and he then subsequently pursued a larger group of Noongar north towards Bunbury where many more were killed around Lake Mininup. This is known as the Wonnerup Massacre. These events were described in 1897 by historian Warren Bert Kimberly as "one of the most bloodthirsty deeds ever committed by Englishmen".

Bussell became a Justice of the Peace in 1855, and a member of the Vasse Board of Education in 1861. During 1864 he taught at Bishop Hale's School (now Hale School) in Perth. He later undertook theological studies, but was never ordained. From 4 November 1870 to 3 July 1872, Bussell served as a nominee Member of the Western Australian Legislative Council. He died near Busselton on 17 September 1875.

In 2016, a sculpture by Greg James, John Garrett Bussell, was unveiled by the City of Busselton in the ArtGeo Cultural Complex as part of the Busselton Settlement Art Project.

== Sources ==
- City of Busselton. "Busselton Settlement Art Project". City of Busselton.
- Heritage Council of Western Australia (30 July 2019). "Cattle Chosen". Heritage Council of Western Australia.
- Ryan, Lyndall; Pascoe, William; Debenham, Jennifer; Gilbert, Stephanie; Richards, Jonathan; Smith, Robyn; Owen, Chris; Anders, Robert J; Brown, Mark; Price, Daniel; Newley, Jack; Usher, Kaine (2019). Colonial Frontier Massacres in Australia. Newcastle: University of Newcastle. hdl:1959.13/1340762.
