= Chapman Hill, Western Australia =

Place in Western Australia

Chapman Hill
- Town
- Coordinates: 33°46′S 115°19′E
- Country: Australia
- State: Western Australia
- LGA(s): City of Busselton
- Location: 238 km (148 mi) from Perth; 18 km (11 mi) from Busselton

Government
  - State electorate(s): Vasse
  - Federal division(s): Forrest

Area
  - Total: 54.3 km^{2} (21.0 sq mi)

Population
  - Total(s): 109 (SAL 2021)
- Time zone: UTC+8 (AWST)
- Postcode: 6280

Chapman Hill is a locality in the South West region of Western Australia in the local government area of the City of Busselton. At the 2021 census, the area had a population of 109.

The eponymous hill, which is in the Whicher Range near the source of the Vasse River, was named after the Chapman brothers, early European settlers in the Busselton area. In the 1920s the area was settled by Group 40 of the Group Settlement Scheme; a memorial to the settlers is on Chapman Hill Road. Chapman Hill contained a signal station during World War II. Cattle-farming is a major industry in the area.
