= Abbey, Western Australia =

Suburb of Busselton, Western Australia

Abbey
- Suburb
- Coordinates: 33°39′S 115°15′E
- Country: Australia
- State: Western Australia
- City: Busselton
- LGA(s): City of Busselton
- Location: 8 km (5.0 mi) from Busselton
- Established: 1987

Government
  - State electorate(s): Vasse
  - Federal division(s): Forrest

Area
  - Total: 2.6 km^{2} (1.0 sq mi)

Population
  - Total(s): 1,321 (SAL 2021)
- Time zone: UTC+8 (AWST)
- Postcode: 6280

Abbey is a suburb of the Western Australian city of Busselton. At the 2021 census, it had a population of 1,321.

This suburb, which was the western part of an area known as Abbeyville, was part of Broadwater when it was gazetted in 1897. In 1955 the area of the Abbey locality was approved as a suburb, officially known as Abbeyville but usually referred to as Abbey; in 1987 it was approved as a bounded locality with the name of "Abbeys", which was changed to "Abbey" in 1993. The name honours D. Abbey, a local landholder; his family's house, constructed in 1851 and 1852, is now a restaurant. Caves Road starts in this suburb, where it meets Bussell Highway.
