= Cyclone Alby =

Category 5 Australian region cyclone in 1978

Severe Tropical Cyclone Alby
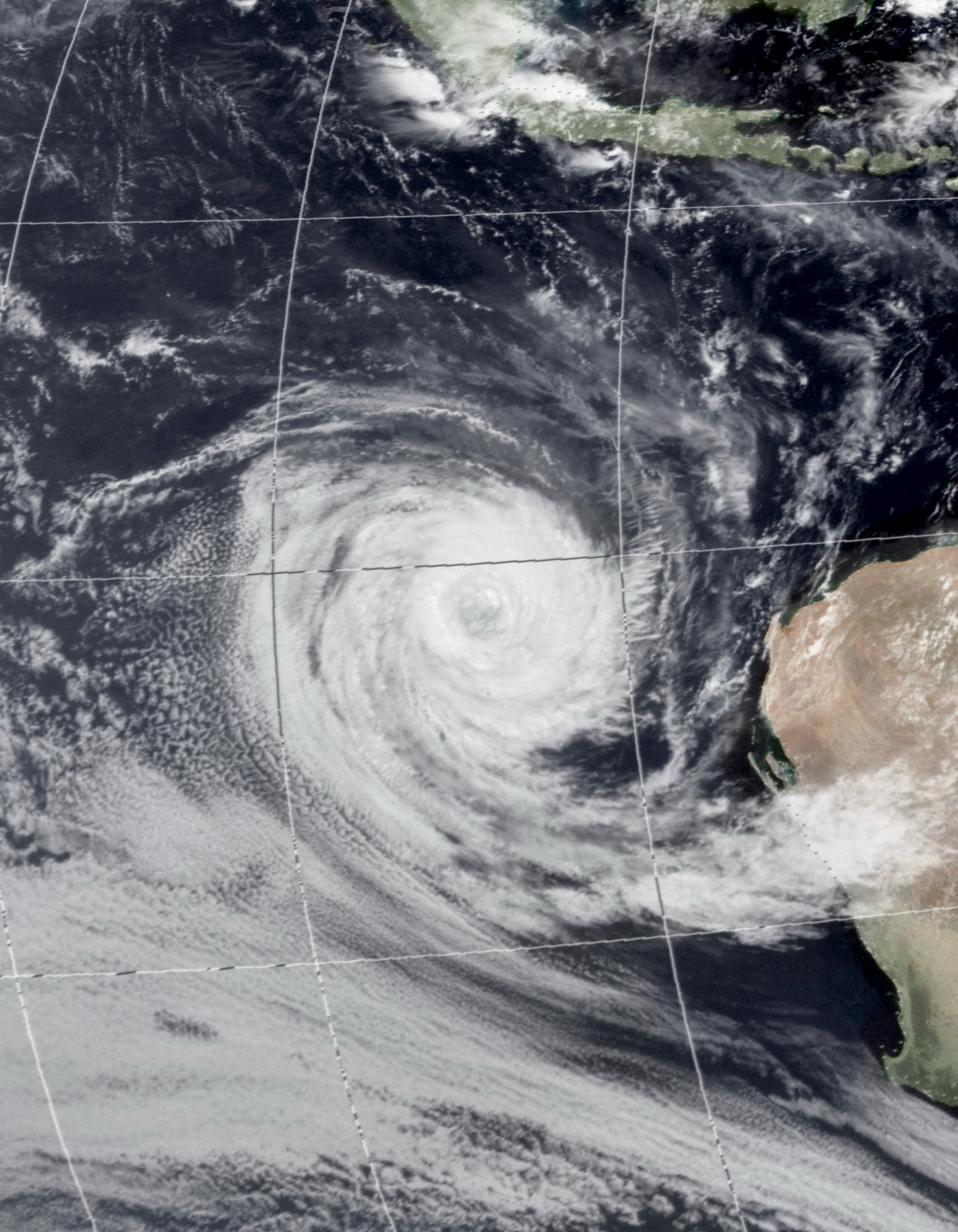
- GMS-1 satellite imagery of Cyclone Alby at peak intensity on 2 April

Meteorological history
- Formed: 27 March 1978
- Dissipated: 5 April 1978

Category 5 severe tropical cyclone
- 10-minute sustained (BOM)
- Highest winds: 205 km/h (125 mph)
- Lowest pressure: 930 hPa (mbar); 27.46 inHg

Category 4-equivalent tropical cyclone
- 1-minute sustained (SSHWS/JTWC)
- Highest winds: 215 km/h (130 mph)

Overall effects
- Fatalities: 2 direct, 3 indirect
- Damage: $45 million (1978 USD)
- Areas affected: Western Australia
- IBTrACS
- Part of the 1977–78 Australian region cyclone season

Severe Tropical Cyclone Alby was regarded as the most devastating tropical cyclone to impact southwestern Western Australia on record. Forming out of an area of low pressure on 27 March 1978, Alby steadily developed as it tracked southwestward, parallel to the west coast. Between 1 and 2 April, the storm quickly intensified and attained its peak intensity as a Category 5 cyclone on the Australian cyclone intensity scale. After turning to the southeast, the storm underwent an extratropical transition as it neared Cape Leeuwin. The storm brushed the cape on 4 April, bringing hurricane-force winds, before rapidly losing its identity the following day.

In Western Australia, the combination of Alby's fast movement and hurricane-force winds caused widespread damage. Along the coast, large swells flooded low-lying areas and numerous homes lost their roofs from high winds. Further inland, bushfires were worsened by the storm as it brought little rain, generally less than 20 mm (0.8 in) along the coast. These fires burned roughly 114,000 hectares (282,000 acres). Cyclone Alby and the associated bushfires caused five deaths, with the heaviest damage in the town of Albany, Western Australia.

A report at the time noted that "The Perth metropolitan area and nearly every town from Geraldton to Albany was extensively damaged." The resulting damage was extensive, with monetary losses reaching A$50 million (US$45 million). According to a Canadian newspaper, the Associated Press reported initially that officials in Perth said that "A tropical cyclone Tuesday tore across the southwestern tip of Australia, killing at least five persons and sparking bushfires that destroyed two towns." The two towns destroyed by fire were identified in an Australian report as Jarrahwood and Yornup.

== Meteorological history ==
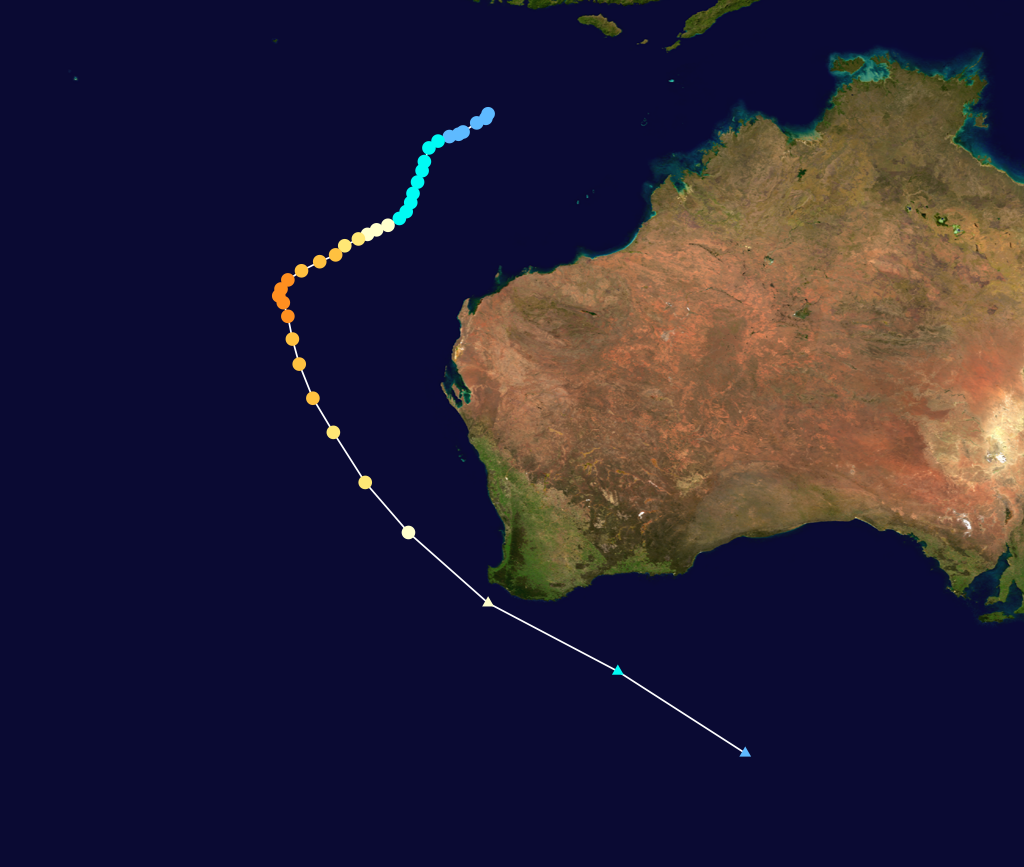
Map plotting the storm's track and intensity, according to the Saffir–Simpson scale Map key Saffir–Simpson scale Tropical depression (≤38 mph, ≤62 km/h) Tropical storm (39–73 mph, 63–118 km/h) Category 1 (74–95 mph, 119–153 km/h) Category 2 (96–110 mph, 154–177 km/h) Category 3 (111–129 mph, 178–208 km/h) Category 4 (130–156 mph, 209–251 km/h) Category 5 (≥157 mph, ≥252 km/h) Unknown Storm type Tropical cyclone Subtropical cyclone Extratropical cyclone, remnant low, tropical disturbance, or monsoon depression

Severe Tropical Cyclone Alby was first identified on 27 March 1978 as a disorganized area of low pressure situated roughly 800 km (500 mi) north-northwest of Karratha. At this time, the system was characterised as a large cluster of convection converging around the low. Notable development took place over the following three days as the system drifted towards the southwest. Convection began wrapping around the storm, forming banding features. Early on 29 March, the Joint Typhoon Warning Center (JTWC), classified the system as a tropical storm. Shortly thereafter, the Bureau of Meteorology in Perth classified it as a tropical cyclone, assigning it with the name Alby. Gale-force winds were later confirmed on 30 March by the Martha Bakke, located 385 km (239 mi) west-northwest of the storm's centre. By then, a large ragged eye developed and Alby steadily intensified through 2 April. At the end of this strengthening, Cyclone Alby attained its peak intensity as a Category 5 on the Australian cyclone intensity scale; a barometric pressure of 930 mbar (hPa; 27.46 inHg) was measured at the time and peak winds were estimated to be 205 km/h (127 mph) based on the Dvorak technique. Additionally, the JTWC assessed the storm to have attained winds of 215 km/h (134 mph), a low-range Category 4 on the Saffir–Simpson hurricane scale.

Shortly after reaching this intensity, Alby slowed as it began turning towards the southeast. By 3 April, the storm rapidly accelerated and attained a forward speed of 50 km/h (31 mph). This rapid acceleration was due to the cyclone's interaction with a cold front to its south. Gradually weakening, Alby also underwent an extratropical transition as the storm's structure became asymmetrical. Around 1300 UTC on 4 April, the storm passed within 100 km (62 mi) of Cape Leeuwin as an extratropical storm. Due to the rapid movement of Alby, the system maintained winds of 120 km/h (75 mph) as it reached this point, making it one of the most intense storms to strike the region. By 5 April, the cyclone rapidly lost its identity as it became caught up in a northwesterly flow before merging with the cold front over the Great Australian Bight.

== Impact and aftermath ==
Retaining winds in excess of 120 km/h (75 mph), Cyclone Alby brought damaging winds to much of the region in and around Cape Leeuwin. The highest winds reached 150 km/h (93 mph) in Albany. In Perth, a peak gust of 130 km/h (81 mph) was measured, the third-highest in the city's history. The intense winds, considered unprecedented for many in the region, were attributed to the fast movement of the storm and its location in relation to land. Moving at speeds up to 90 km/h (56 mph), winds along the northeastern edge of the storm were increased by that amount due to Alby's clockwise rotation. It also allowed for winds to cover a large area northeast of the centre, impacting many areas far from the storm. In general, rainfall was limited and generally less than 20 mm (0.8 in); this was due to the fast movement, as well as the asymmetrical structure with most of the thunderstorms south of the center.

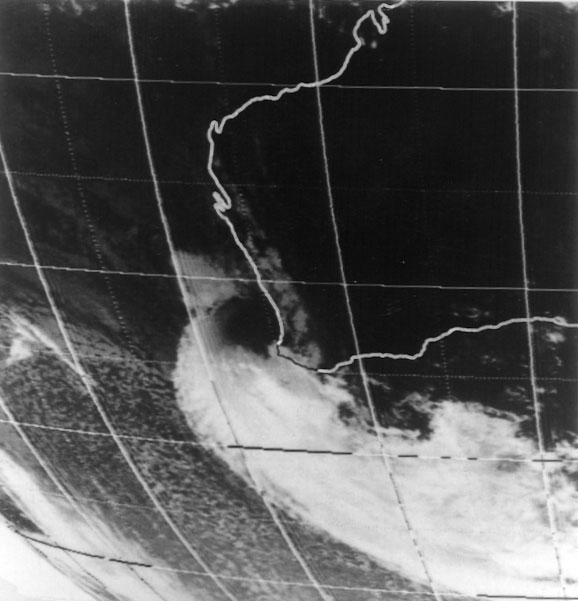
Satellite image of the remnants of Alby near Australia on 4 April

These winds resulted in widespread agricultural, environmental and structural damage. Hundreds of structures sustained severe damage, mostly consisting of roofs blowing off. The most severe losses took place in Albany where most homes had partial or complete roof failure. Air-borne debris also damaged buildings during the storm. Nearly 80% of the apple crop was lost in the Donnybrook–Manjimup area. A total of 154,400 m^{3} (5.4 million ft^{3}) of timber was lost as well as a potential 200,000 m^{3} (7 million ft^{3}) of future growth on established trees. Widespread dust storms also ruined crops and removed topsoil from many areas. Near the coast, the combined effects of strong, onshore winds and little rain led to significant inland sea spray. Numerous power lines and stations failed during the storm due to winds as well as dust and salt accretion. Large portions of the South-West Land Division were without electricity due to Cyclone Alby; Perth nearly sustained a complete breakdown of power services. This led to secondary losses attributable to the storm such as production failure. One person died in Toodyay after falling off his roof while trying to repair it. Newspapers connected the death of one person in a vehicle accident in Pemberton to the storm; however, the Bureau of Meteorology does not attribute it to Alby.

The large expanse of gale-force winds without precipitation exacerbated 92 ongoing brush fires in the region. These fires erupted into full-fledged wildfires, expanding at a rate of 5 to 10 km/h (3 to 6 mph). A total of 114,000 hectares (282,000 acres) of land was burned throughout Western Australia as a result of the fires. Within this area, more than 10,000 sheep and 500 cattle and horses were killed. Over 100 structures, 1,300 km (810 mi) of fencing and tens of thousands of hay bales were destroyed. According to newspaper reports, the towns of Jarrahwood and Yornup were leveled by the wildfires. At least 50 individual fires were fanned by the storm across the region, prompting more than 1,000 firefighters to assist in putting them out. Containment efforts were successful after six days, with the fires put under control by 10 April. Two people were killed while trying to suppress the fires: one from a fallen tree in Mount Barker and the other in Manjiump when a bulldozer clearing a firebreak flipped over.

Along the coast, large swells produced by the storm resulted in two fatalities in Albany Harbour as well as significant coastal damage. Tides across the region were expected to increase. Unexpectedly, all forecast values were exceeded by at least 0.3 m (0.98 ft). The highest storm tide was in Busselton at 2.5 m (8.2 ft), leading to a storm surge of 1.1 m (3.6 ft). Here, the surge penetrated roughly 200 m (656 ft) inland, forcing several evacuations. This led to significant coastal flooding that damaged dozens of structures, including Busselton Jetty. In Bunbury, water breached the sea wall, inundating 100 homes and prompting the evacuation of 130 residents. Throughout Western Australia, Cyclone Alby was responsible for five fatalities and A$50 million (US$45 million) in damage. There was also severe beach erosion associated with the storm, with some areas losing 30 m (98 ft) of land. Due to the extensive damage, the name Alby was retired from the list of Western Australian cyclone names following its usage.

In the wake of Cyclone Alby, an appeal for relief in the affected region was made by The Lord Mayor's Distress Relief Fund. The unprecedented scale of damage prompted meteorologists to vastly improve forecasting in the region to be better prepared for a similar storm in the future. At the time, little to no warning was given to residents in the South-West Land Division; this was the result of Alby's abrupt acceleration along a cold front, a complex forecasting situation. It was also regarded as a "wake up call" for the region, reminding residents that they are not immune to the effects of tropical cyclones. Cyclone Alby has been used as a benchmark to compare future storms in the region to, such as Severe Tropical Cyclone Bianca in 2011.

== See also ==
- List of cyclones in Western Australia
- List of retired Australian cyclone names
