= Yoganup, Western Australia =

Locality in the City of Busselton, Western Australia

Yoganup
- Suburb
- Interactive map of Yoganup
- Coordinates: 33.74°S 115.64°E
- Country: Australia
- State: Western Australia
- LGA: City of Busselton
- Location: 229 km (142 mi) from Perth; 24 km (15 mi) from Busselton

Government
  - State electorate: Vasse
  - Federal division: Forrest

Area
  - Total: 383.8 km^{2} (148.2 sq mi)

Population
  - Total: 15 (SAL 2021)
- Postcode: 6275

Yoganup is a rural locality of the City of Busselton in the South West region of Western Australia. It is the largest locality in the City of Busselton but has the second-lowest population, being almost completely forested. Whicher National Park is almost completely located within Yoganup and the small town of Jarrahwood is completely surrounded by the locality, but not part of it. The Vasse Highway passes through the south-west of Yoganup.

The City of Busselton and the locality of Yoganup are located on the traditional land of the Wardandi (also spelled Wadandi) people of the Noongar nation.

Yoganup was the location of the first railway in Western Australia, the Ballaarat tramline, a private timber railway constructed in 1871. The name of the area was previously spelt "Yokanup".
