= Broadwater, Western Australia =

Suburb of Busselton, Western Australia

Broadwater
- Suburb
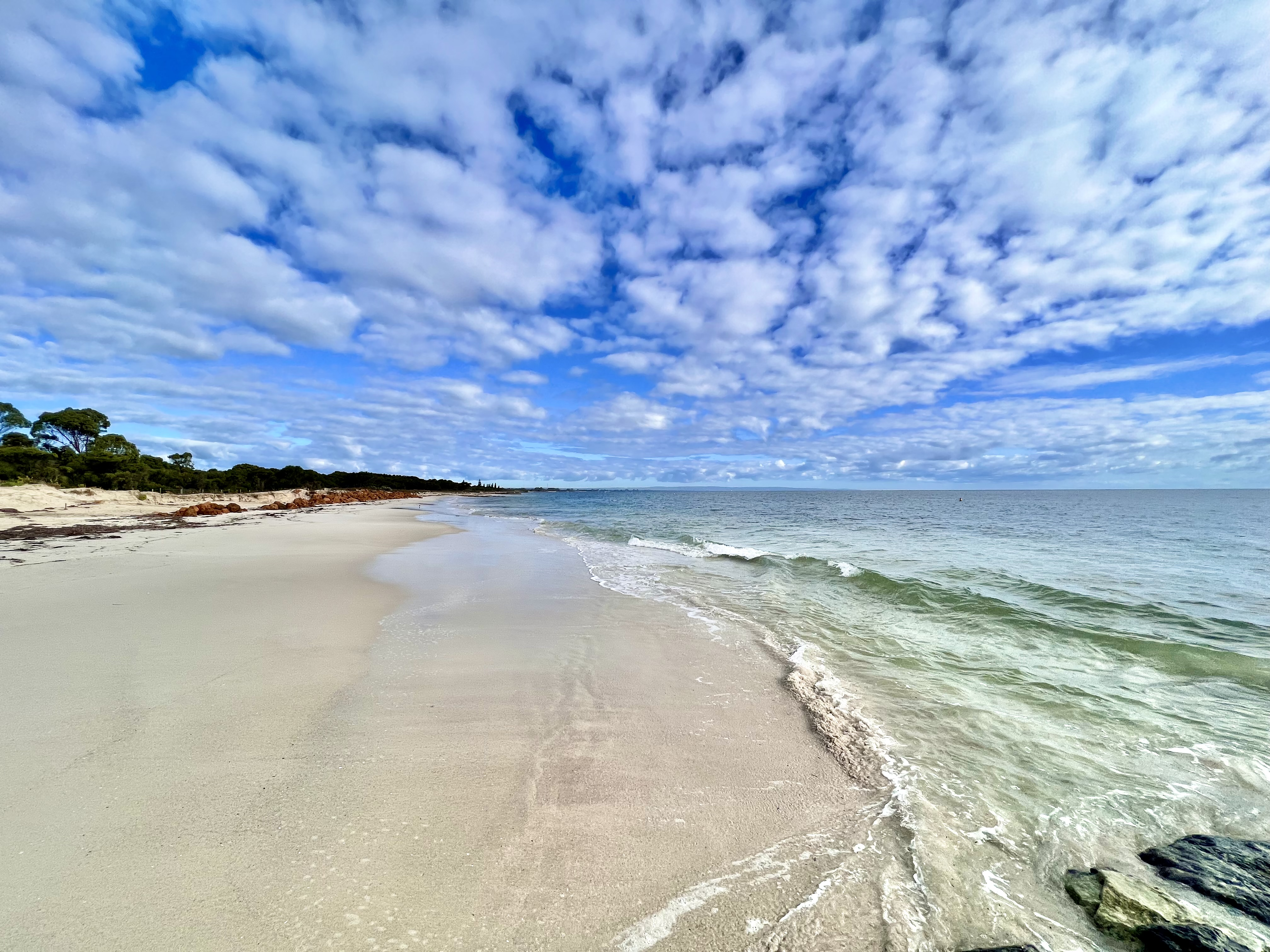
- Beach at Broadwater, Geographe Bay

- Interactive map of Broadwater
- Coordinates: 33°39′S 115°17′E
- Country: Australia
- State: Western Australia
- City: Busselton
- LGA: City of Busselton
- Location: 6 km (3.7 mi) from Busselton
- Established: 1897

Government
  - State electorate: Vasse
  - Federal division: Forrest

Area
  - Total: 6.2 km^{2} (2.4 sq mi)

Population
  - Total: 4,269 (SAL 2021)
- Time zone: UTC+8 (AWST)
- Postcode: 6280

Broadwater is a suburb of the Western Australian city of Busselton. At the 2021 census, it had a population of 4,269.

Broadwater was gazetted in 1897; it originally contained what is now the Busselton suburb of Abbey. It contains a mix of residential areas and tourist accommodation providers, which take advantage of its proximity to the foreshore at Geographe Bay. A drive-in cinema was built in Broadwater in 1960; by the time of its closure in 2015, it was one of the last such structures in Western Australia.
