= Ambergate, Western Australia =

Suburb of Busselton, Western Australia

Ambergate
- Suburb
- Coordinates: 33°42′42″S 115°19′35″E
- Country: Australia
- State: Western Australia
- LGA: City of Busselton
- Location: 8 km (5.0 mi) south of Busselton
- Established: 1987

Government
  - State electorate: Vasse
  - Federal division: Forrest

Area
  - Total: 38.4 km^{2} (14.8 sq mi)
- Elevation: 21 m (69 ft)

Population
  - Total: 564 (SAL 2021)
- Postcode: 6280

Ambergate is a semi-rural suburb of the city of Busselton in the South West region of Western Australia. At the 2021 census, it had a population of 564.

After European settlement, the community began to develop as part of the Group Settlement Scheme, with a school being open from 1924 to 1941 and a hall (which was also used as the school building) being constructed in 1935. It was established as a bounded locality in 1987, with its boundaries being modified in 1998 to follow cadastral and hydrographic boundaries. The suburb has been earmarked for urban development.
