= Baudin, Western Australia =

Baudin
- Interactive map of Baudin
- Coordinates: 33°51′25.71″S 115°26′26.52″E
- Country: Australia
- State: Western Australia
- LGA: Shire of Augusta-Margaret River

Government
  - State electorate: Vasse
  - Federal division: Forrest

Area
  - Total: 343.8 km^{2} (132.7 sq mi)

Population
  - Total: 0 (SAL 2016)
- Postcode: 6284

Baudin is a locality in the South West region of Western Australia in the Shire of Augusta-Margaret River.
