= Yoongarillup, Western Australia =

Locality in Western Australia

Yoongarillup
- Town
- Coordinates: 33°42′S 115°25′E
- Country: Australia
- State: Western Australia
- LGA(s): City of Busselton
- Location: 222 km (138 mi) from Perth; 11 km (6.8 mi) from Busselton

Government
  - State electorate(s): Vasse
  - Federal division(s): Forrest

Area
  - Total: 26.4 km^{2} (10.2 sq mi)

Population
  - Total(s): 79 (SAL 2021)
- Time zone: UTC+8 (AWST)
- Postcode: 6280

Yoongarillup is a locality in Western Australia's South West region in the local government area of the City of Busselton. At the 2021 census, the area had a population of 79.

The area's name is derived from the Wardandi dialect of the Noongar language and means "by the Nyungar who belong and come hither to burn on this district". Spanish settlers arrived in the early 20th century on the recommendation of Rutlan Casas, who had visited in the late 19th century. The Spanish grew potatoes and were later renowned winemakers in the area, which became known as the Spanish Settlement. The area also became part of the Group Settlement Scheme in the 1920s, with the Yoongarillup Hall being built in 1923 during this period. In 2017, a sculpture by Greg James, Spanish Settler, was unveiled by the City of Busselton in the ArtGeo Cultural Complex as part of the Busselton Settlement Art Project.
