= Caves Road (Western Australia) =

Road in Western Australia

Caves Road Western Australia
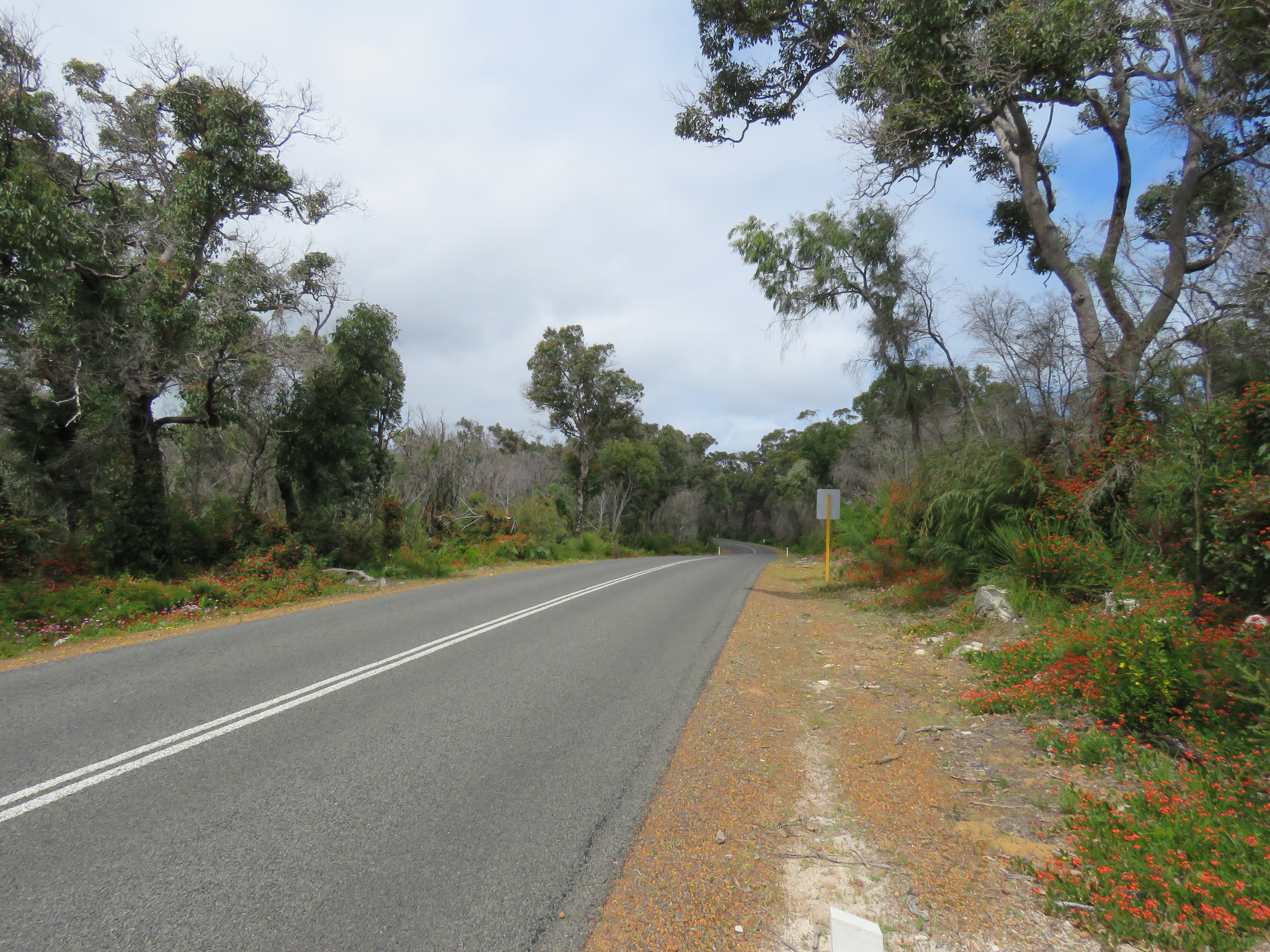
- Caves Road at Mammoth Cave, Boranup

General information
- Type: Rural road
- Length: 111 km (69 mi)
- Maintained by: Main Roads Western Australia
- Tourist routes: Tourist Drive 250 (south of Cape Naturaliste Road)

Major junctions
- North-east end: Bussell Highway, Abbey
- Cape Naturaliste Road (Tourist Drive 250); Cowaramup Bay Road; Wallcliffe Road; Boodjidup Road; Bushby Road
- South end: Bussell Highway (State Route 10), Augusta

Location(s)
- Major settlements: Dunsborough, Yallingup, Margaret River

Caves Road is a 111-kilometre-long (69 mi) scenic route in the South West region of Western Australia. It connects western Busselton with Augusta, running along or to the west of the Leeuwin-Naturaliste ridge, and is an alternative route to Bussell Highway. Caves Road is also a major component of the route from Cape Naturaliste to Cape Leeuwin, in what is known as the state's Capes Region.

== Route description ==
Starting at Bussell Highway in Abbey, west of Busselton, Caves Road initially heads west passing the Locke Estate or "Holy Mile" through Dunsborough to Yallingup. From there the road travels southwards, between the coast and Bussell Highway, which it rejoins at the northern edge of Augusta.

Caves Road forms the majority of Tourist Drive 250, which is named Caves Road Tourist Drive. The route runs from Cape Naturaliste, north-west of Dunsborough, to Cape Leeuwin, south of Augusta.

Most of the surfing locations that are on the coastline between Cape Leeuwin and Cape Naturaliste are accessed via Caves Road.

It is a narrow winding road in most parts, and much has been made of its picturesque quality and passage through Karri forest.

== History ==
Caves Road was named due to it being a way to access the caves of the region, though it was sometimes referred to as Margaret Caves Road. It has since also been considered as a tourist route within the road network, and designated as such in the 1990s.

In the early 1900s, loggers and tourists travelled by horse and cart on parts of what would become Caves Road to visit caves in the area. In August 1921, a key section of the road going northwards was paved, allowing motor-cars to travel the route both ways for the first time. In the 1930s to 1960s its condition was a problem. A few sections run for only short straight alignments; its upgrading and maintenance is an ongoing issue. There is an ongoing campaign to have the road heritage-listed at the state and federal level; the idea was first seriously considered in 2018.

== See also ==
- Leeuwin-Naturaliste National Park
- Tourist Drives in Western Australia
