= Busselton Jetty =

Heritage listed jetty in Busselton, Western Australia

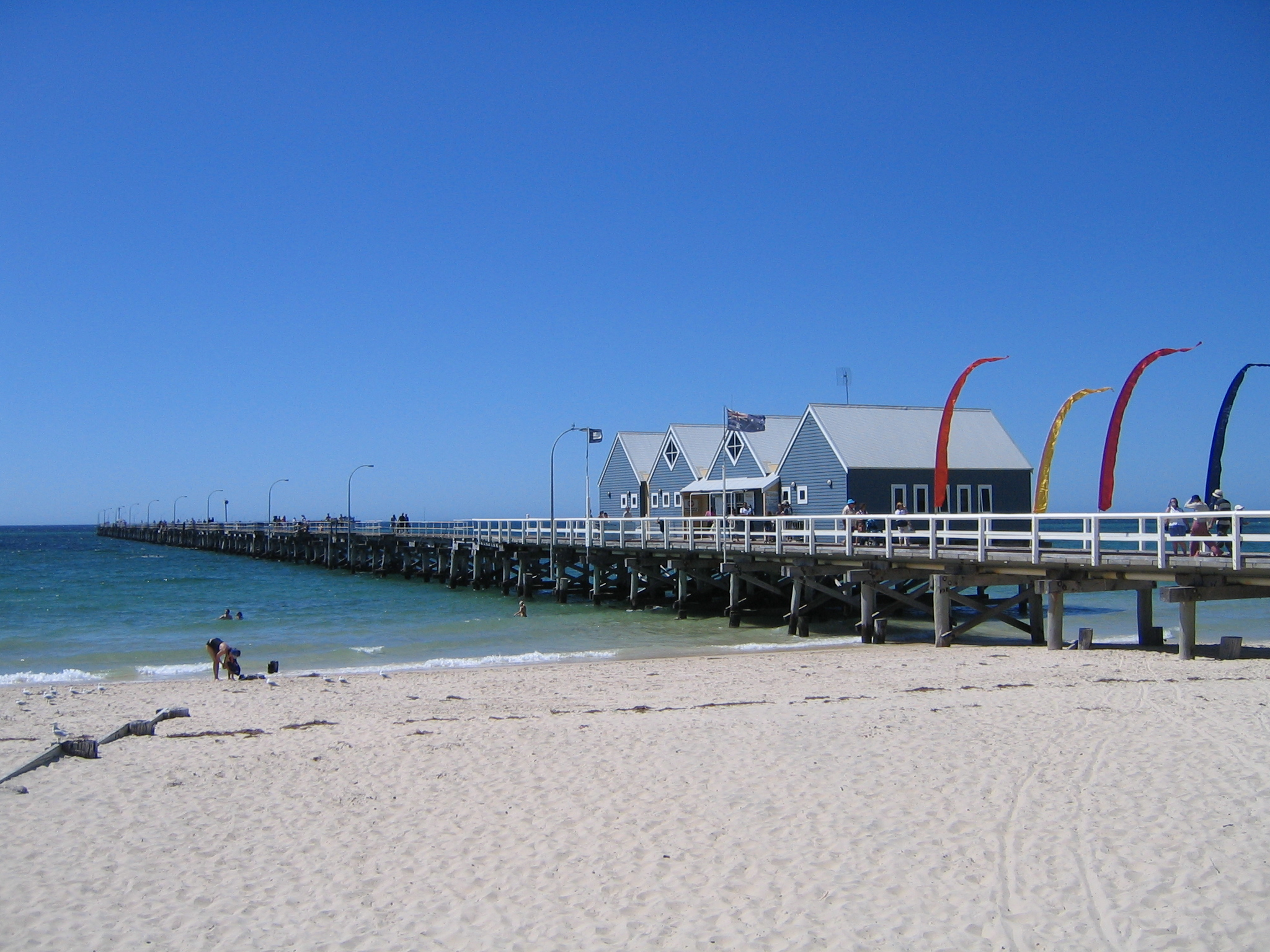
- At 1,841 metres (6,040 ft), the jetty is said to be the longest wooden structure in the Southern Hemisphere

- Location within Western Australia

General information
- Type: Jetty
- Location: Busselton, Western Australia
- Coordinates: 33.6369°S 115.3401°E

Website
- www.busseltonjetty.com.au

Western Australia Heritage Register
- Designated: 22 November 2013
- Reference no.: 423

Busselton Jetty is a jetty located in Busselton, Western Australia. It is the longest timber-piled jetty (pier) in the Southern Hemisphere at 1,841 metres (6,040 ft) long. The jetty is managed by a not-for-profit community organisation, Busselton Jetty Inc.

The jetty's construction commenced in 1864 and the first section was opened in 1865. The jetty was extended numerous times until the 1960s, ultimately reaching a length of 1,841 metres (6,040 ft). The last commercial vessel called at the jetty in 1971 and the jetty was closed the following year. It passed into the control of Busselton Shire and has been gradually restored and improved since. The jetty has survived Cyclone Alby in 1978, borers, weathering, several fires, and the threat of demolition, to have become a major regional tourist attraction.

The jetty features a rail line along its length, a relic of the railway line into Busselton from Bunbury. The line now carries tourists along the jetty to an underwater observatory, one of only six natural aquariums in the world.

== History ==
=== Early history ===
In 1839 Governor Hutt appointed "the place in Geographe Bay opposite the Settlement at The Vasse to be the legal place for the loading and unloading of goods". Construction of the jetty – originally known as the Vasse Jetty – commenced in 1864 after persistent pressure by settlers, among others timber merchant Henry Yelverton and magistrate Joseph Strelley Harris; Yelverton's company was awarded the tender for construction. In 1865 the first section, approximately 176 m (577 ft), of the jetty became available for ships to moor. In 1875 an additional 143 m (469 ft) was added to the original structure, as over 10 years' accumulation of drift sands had made the water too shallow for mooring. The jetty was continually extended until the 1960s when it reached its current length of 1,841 metres (6,040 ft). Fires on the jetty were commonplace, with some attributed to fishermen carelessly disposing of burning cigarettes, dropping lit matches or to sparks falling from the train's fire box.

=== Closure ===
Even while the port was operating commercially, maintenance costs were controversial. The last commercial ship visited the jetty on 17 October 1971. On 21 July 1972, the jetty was closed to shipping by Governor's Proclamation in the Western Australian Government Gazette after more than a century of use. Once closed, government maintenance of the jetty ceased and it began to deteriorate, suffering attack by wood borers, rot and the occasional fire.

=== Cyclone Alby ===
On 4 April 1978, Cyclone Alby swept south down the Western Australian coast from the North-West (a rare occurrence) and destroyed a large part of the shore end of the jetty. Subsequently, townspeople banded together to try to save the jetty and eventually persuaded the State Government and the Shire Council to provide some much needed funds for repair.

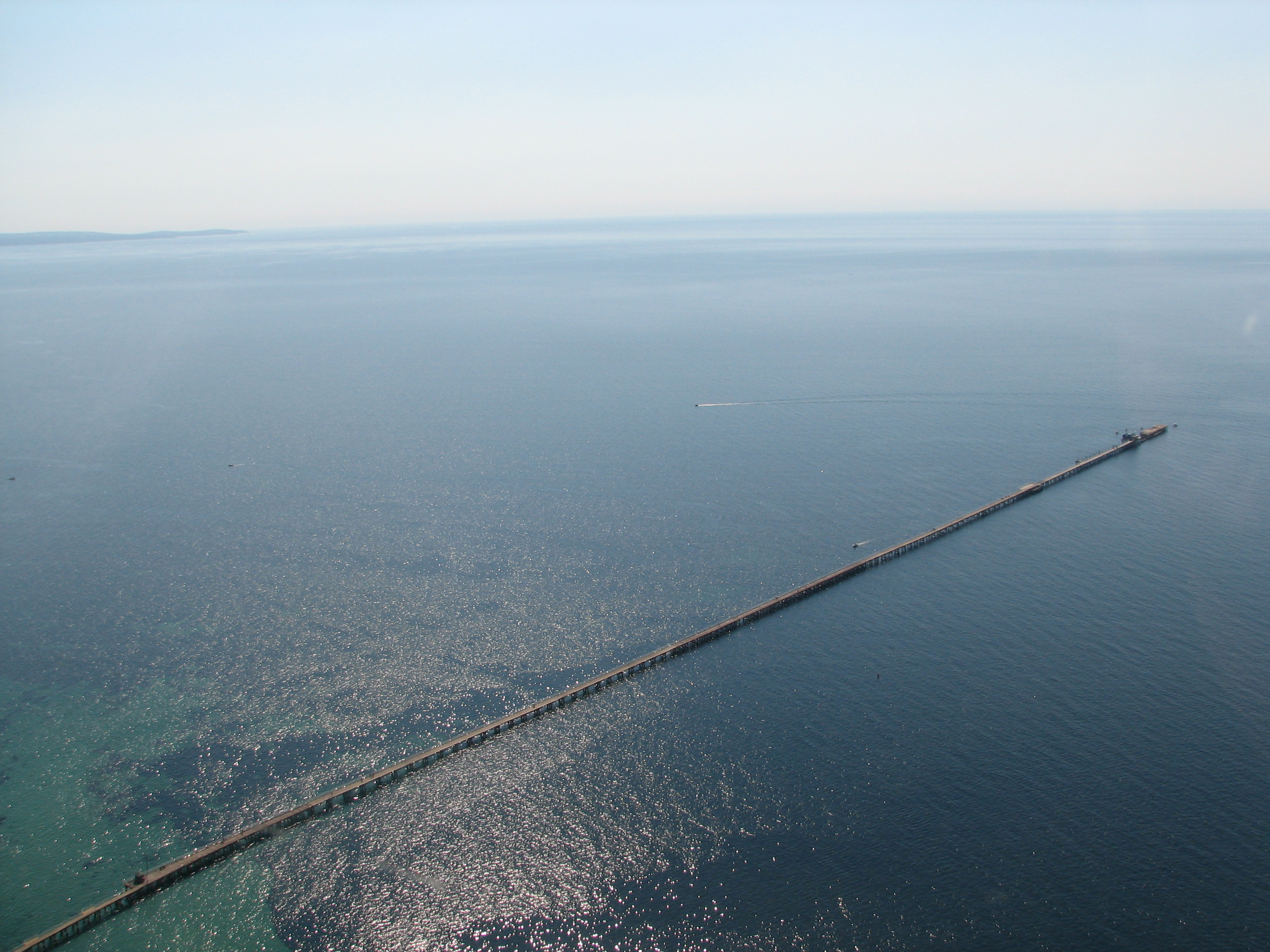
Busselton Jetty from the air

Rebuilding the timber jetty proved expensive and funds soon ran out. The Jetty Preservation Committee, formed in 1987, resorted to community fund-raising.

In December 1999, a fire burnt 65 metres of jetty to the water-line incurring damage totaling $900,000.

=== Revitalisation ===
By 2001, the Busselton Jetty Preservation Committee had raised just A$14,000 — a rate of A$1,000 per year since its founding in 1987. In 2001, a new community-development Non-Government Organization (NGO), named "The Busselton Challenge", assisted the Committee in designing and executing a new fund-raising project that raised A$220,000 in just six months — 440 times the previous rate of fund-raising. April that same year also saw the opening of an Interpretive Centre and museum near the shore end of the jetty.

On 13 December 2003, the underwater observatory opened at a cost of A$3.6 million. With the state government providing A$1 million in funding, the structure was built in Perth before being floated down to the jetty site.

Further storm damage occurred in 2004, but the fund-raising project continued. The jetty was re-positioned as an important state and national resource, enabling the Committee to attract funding for a A$27 million refurbishment project and enter the jetty into the State Register of Heritage Places, thereby securing its future.

On 9 February 2006, the Queen's Baton Relay passed through Busselton. The baton was taken along the Busselton Jetty and then taken underwater by a scuba diver. The baton passed by the underwater observatory during its swim to allow the media to view the event.

In 2011 the refurbishment project was completed and the pier and railway were reopened to the public. In 2017 the train was replaced with a solar-powered electric vehicle.

In 2019, it was announced that Federal government funding for a new discovery centre to replace the underwater observatory had been secured. In early 2021, the design for the new A$32 million Australian Underwater Discovery Centre was revealed: a semi-submerged four storey whale-shaped structure, it was designed to have a higher visitor capacity and contain larger viewing windows compared to the original underwater observatory, and was to contain a gallery, exhibition spaces and a marine research centre. Like the previous structure, it was planned to be constructed in Perth before being towed out to Busselton, with an intended opening in 2023. In addition, an accompanying "village" containing food and beverage outlets as well as spaces for weddings and corporate functions was also planned for the end of the jetty. However in 2022, construction of the Australian Underwater Discovery Centre was shelved after a blowout in costs due to the COVID-19 pandemic, though development of the village will move ahead and include a new onshore educational Marine Discovery Centre.

In early 2023 a number of steel and concrete sculptures began to be installed underwater underneath and alongside the jetty to create an artificial reef and diving trail.

In July 2024, the Marine Discovery Centre was opened.

== Attractions ==
=== Interpretive centre ===
A boatshed-style Interpretive Centre is located 50 m (160 ft) offshore. The Interpretive Centre features a museum that gives visitors a glimpse into the jetty's past and its future, and also contains a gift shop and a point of sale for tickets for the train and underwater observatory.

=== Underwater observatory ===
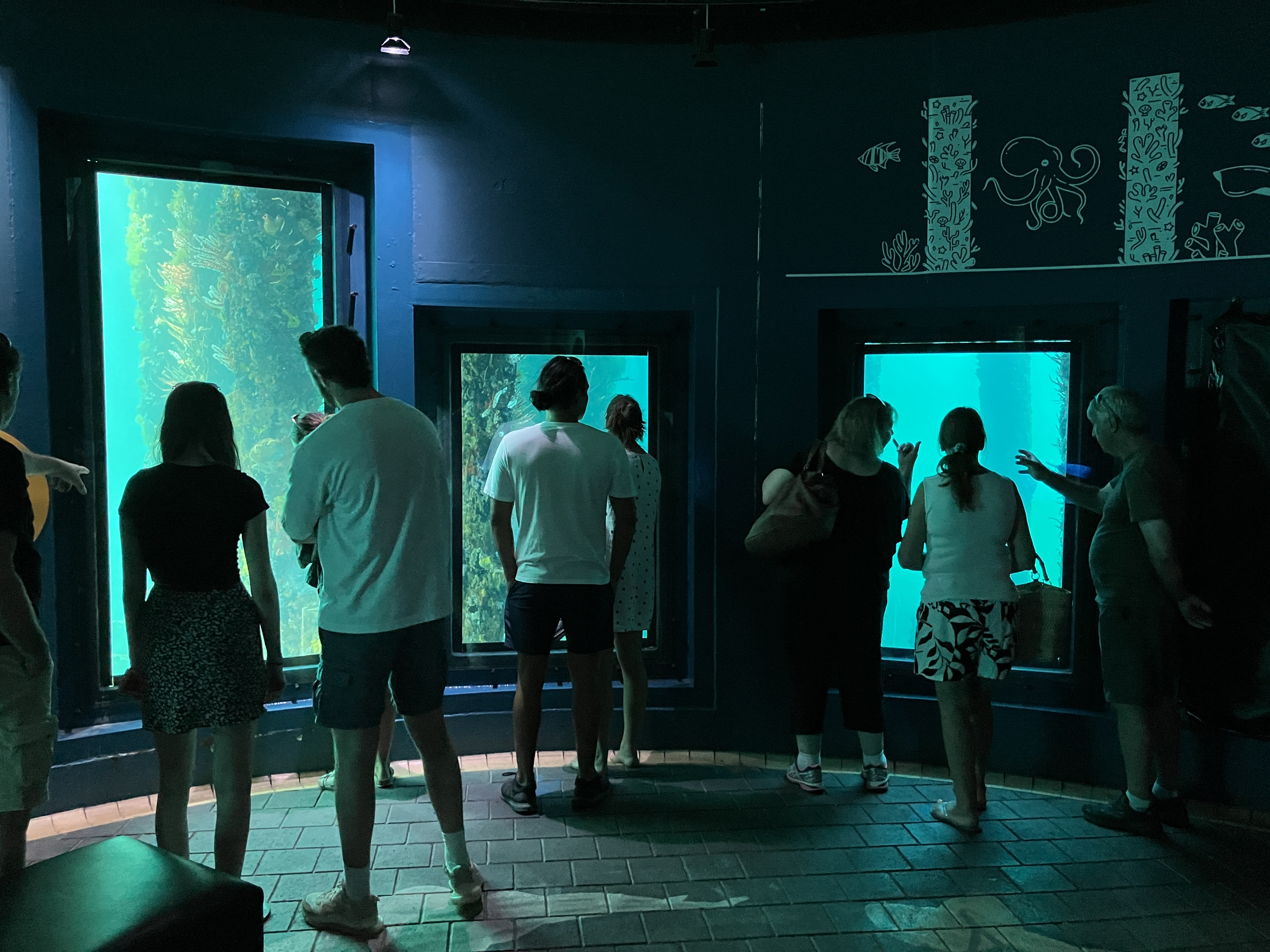
Busselton Jetty underwater observatory

The underwater observatory is located 1.8 kilometres (1.1 mi) from shore – almost at the end of the Busselton Jetty – and can accommodate up to 40 people at a time in its 9.5-metre (31 ft) diameter observation chamber. Descending 8 metres (26 ft) below sea level, visitors can view the corals and fish life through eleven viewing windows.

=== Marine Discovery Centre ===
The onshore facility, located in the nearby Railway House, features interactive displays and immersive exhibits of Australia’s offshore marine parks. It has been partially designed to cater to visitors when inclement weather forces jetty-based attractions such as the train or underwater observatory to close, as well as those with limited time to explore.

=== Sculpture reef ===
The sculpture reef consists of 13 underwater sculptures by Western Australian artists situated underneath and alongside the jetty. The sculptures form a diving trail as well as a habitat for sealife.

=== Memorial plaques ===
Along one side of a section of the jetty are a number of memorial plaques, commemorating people whose ashes have been scattered from the jetty.

In February 2012 the Busselton Council limited the placement of such plaques to "exceptional circumstances", for people who had made significant contributions to or associated with the jetty.

=== Former attractions ===
In 1981, a waterslide opened adjacent to the landward end of the Busselton jetty, called the Nautical Lady. It was built wrapping around the existing lighthouse tower and was driven by pumped seawater. In 2011, the land which was occupied by the waterslide and associated amusement park attractions was re-purchased by the City of Busselton and the slide was shut down. The Nautical Lady lighthouse was eventually demolished in 2015.

== See also ==
- Port Germein, South Australia jetty, opened in 1881, extended to 1,680 m (5,510 ft) in 1883, then reduced to 1,532 m (5,026 ft) following storm damage.
