= Acton Park, Western Australia =

Acton Park
- Town
- Interactive map of Acton Park
- Coordinates: 33°45′40″S 115°22′16″E
- Country: Australia
- State: Western Australia
- LGA: City of Busselton
- Location: 16 km (9.9 mi) from Busselton
- Established: 1987

Government
  - State electorate: Vasse
  - Federal division: Forrest

Area
  - Total: 23.7 km^{2} (9.2 sq mi)
- Elevation: 58 m (190 ft)

Population
  - Total: 92 (SAL 2021)
- Postcode: 6280

Acton Park is a small town and agricultural district in the South West region of Western Australia inland from Busselton along Jalbarragup Road. It was established as part of the Group Settlement Scheme in the 1920s and the local hall was constructed in 1924. The area was gazetted as a bounded locality in 1987. At the 2021 Australian census the area had a population of 92.
