= City of Busselton =

Coordinates: 33°38′53″S 115°20′46″E

- Local government area
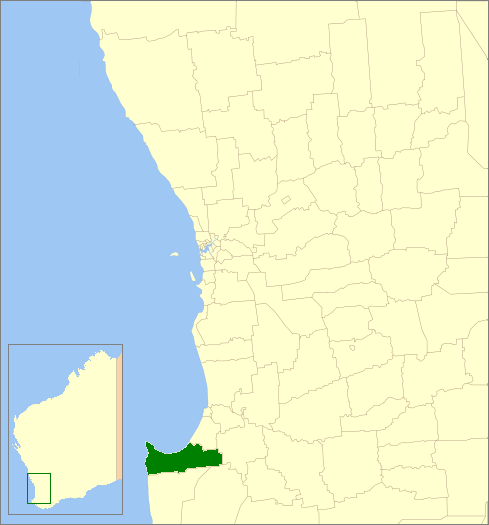
- Location in Western Australia

- Interactive map of City of Busselton
- Country: Australia
- State: Western Australia
- Region: South West
- Established: 1951
- Council seat: Busselton

Government
  - Mayor: Phill Cronin
  - State electorate: Vasse
  - Federal division: Forrest

Area
  - Total: 1,454.8 km^{2} (561.7 sq mi)

Population
  - Total: 40,640 (LGA 2021)
- Website: City of Busselton
LGAs around City of Busselton
	Geographe Bay	Capel
Indian Ocean	City of Busselton	Donnybrook- Balingup
	Augusta Margaret River	Nannup

The City of Busselton is a local government area in the South West region of Western Australia, approximately 230 km (140 mi) south of Perth, the state capital. The city covers an area of 1,455 km^{2} (562 sq mi) and had a population of 40,640 as at the 2021 census. It contains two large towns, Busselton and Dunsborough, and a number of smaller towns. The city office is located on Southern Drive, Busselton.

== History ==
The City of Busselton was established as the Busselton Road District on 11 May 1951 with the amalgamation of the Municipality of Busselton, governing the area of Busselton bounded by West Street and Ford Road, and the Sussex Road District, governing the remaining area. Both bodies had been established in 1871.

The road district was declared a shire and became the Shire of Busselton with effect from 1 July 1961 following the passage of the Local Government Act 1960, which reformed all remaining road districts into shires.

In 2007 it abolished its system of wards for electing councillors. On 21 January 2012 the Shire of Busselton gained city status and became the City of Busselton.

The City of Busselton and neighbouring Capel are among the state's fastest growing areas.

== Indigenous people ==
The City of Busselton is located on the traditional land of the Wardandi (also spelled Wadandi) people of the Noongar nation.

== Towns, suburbs and localities ==
The towns, suburbs and localities of the City of Busselton with population and size figures based on the most recent Australian census:

Locality	Population	Area	Map
Abba River	83 (SAL 2021)	28.4 km^{2} (11.0 sq mi)	
Abbey	1,321 (SAL 2021)	2.6 km^{2} (1.0 sq mi)	
Acton Park	92 (SAL 2021)	23.7 km^{2} (9.2 sq mi)	
Ambergate	564 (SAL 2021)	38.4 km^{2} (14.8 sq mi)	
Anniebrook	53 (SAL 2021)	13.1 km^{2} (5.1 sq mi)	
Boallia	39 (SAL 2021)	37.5 km^{2} (14.5 sq mi)	
Bovell	475 (SAL 2021)	13.3 km^{2} (5.1 sq mi)	
Broadwater	4,269 (SAL 2021)	6.2 km^{2} (2.4 sq mi)	
Busselton	1,838 (SAL 2021)	4.5 km^{2} (1.7 sq mi)	
Carbunup River	112 (SAL 2021)	28 km^{2} (11 sq mi)	
Chapman Hill	109 (SAL 2021)	54.3 km^{2} (21.0 sq mi)	
Dunsborough	6,413 (SAL 2021)	16.3 km^{2} (6.3 sq mi)	
Eagle Bay	120 (SAL 2021)	1.9 km^{2} (0.73 sq mi)	
Geographe	3,622 (SAL 2021)	6 km^{2} (2.3 sq mi)	
Hithergreen	61 (SAL 2016)	24.2 km^{2} (9.3 sq mi)	
Jarrahwood	9 (SAL 2021)	1 km^{2} (0.39 sq mi)	
Jindong	68 (SAL 2021)	22.4 km^{2} (8.6 sq mi)	
Kalgup	91 (SAL 2021)	17 km^{2} (6.6 sq mi)	
Kaloorup	90 (SAL 2021)	45.1 km^{2} (17.4 sq mi)	
Kealy	1,119 (SAL 2021)	6.5 km^{2} (2.5 sq mi)	
Ludlow *	132 (SAL 2021)	49.2 km^{2} (19.0 sq mi)	
Marybrook	229 (SAL 2021)	15.4 km^{2} (5.9 sq mi)	
Metricup	263 (SAL 2021)	57.2 km^{2} (22.1 sq mi)	
Naturaliste	107 (SAL 2021)	56 km^{2} (22 sq mi)	
North Jindong	75 (SAL 2021)	19.1 km^{2} (7.4 sq mi)	
Quedjinup	420 (SAL 2021)	8 km^{2} (3.1 sq mi)	
Quindalup	1,488 (SAL 2021)	39.9 km^{2} (15.4 sq mi)	
Reinscourt	280 (SAL 2021)	8.6 km^{2} (3.3 sq mi)	
Ruabon	82 (SAL 2021)	31.6 km^{2} (12.2 sq mi)	
Sabina River	79 (SAL 2021)	18.5 km^{2} (7.1 sq mi)	
Siesta Park	60 (SAL 2021)	0.9 km^{2} (0.35 sq mi)	
Tutunup	75 (SAL 2021)	41.5 km^{2} (16.0 sq mi)	
Vasse	2,853 (SAL 2021)	36.1 km^{2} (13.9 sq mi)	
Walsall	82 (SAL 2021)	23.2 km^{2} (9.0 sq mi)	
West Busselton	8,869 (SAL 2021)	8.2 km^{2} (3.2 sq mi)	
Wilyabrup	193 (SAL 2021)	81.7 km^{2} (31.5 sq mi)	
Wonnerup	196 (SAL 2021)	17.6 km^{2} (6.8 sq mi)	
Yallingup	1,195 (SAL 2021)	75.3 km^{2} (29.1 sq mi)	
Yallingup Siding	324 (SAL 2021)	20.2 km^{2} (7.8 sq mi)	
Yalyalup	2,950 (SAL 2021)	32.2 km^{2} (12.4 sq mi)	
Yelverton	72 (SAL 2021)	34.1 km^{2} (13.2 sq mi)	
Yoganup	15 (SAL 2021)	383.8 km^{2} (148.2 sq mi)	
Yoongarillup	79 (SAL 2021)	26.4 km^{2} (10.2 sq mi)	

- (* indicates locality is only partially located within this city)

== Population ==
The historical populations of the Busselton Municipal District and the Sussex Road District were as follows before their amalgamation:

Year	Population	Busselton	Sussex
1911	1,786	693	1,093
1921	1,846	610	1,236
1933	4,053	916	3,137
1947	4,024	1008	3,016

The figures for the censuses since the council amalgamation are as follows:

Historical population

Year	Pop.	±% p.a.
1954	5,265	—
1961	6,120	+2.17%
1966	6,803	+2.14%
1971	7,426	+1.77%
1976	7,897	+1.24%
1981	9,369	+3.48%
1986	11,933	+4.96%

Year	Pop.	±% p.a.
1991	14,592	+4.11%
1996	18,158	+4.47%
2001	23,099	+4.93%
2006	26,638	+2.89%
2011	30,330	+2.63%
2016	36,686	+3.88%
2021	40,640	+2.07%

== Heritage-listed places ==
As of 2023, 225 places are heritage-listed in the City of Busselton, of which 33 are on the State Register of Heritage Places, among them the Cape Naturaliste Lighthouse, Busselton Jetty and Wonnerup House.

== See also ==
- List of heritage places in Busselton
