= Bovell, Western Australia =

Suburb of Busselton, Western Australia

Bovell
- Suburb
- Coordinates: 33°40′S 115°21′E
- Country: Australia
- State: Western Australia
- City: Busselton
- LGA(s): City of Busselton
- Location: 2 km (1.2 mi) from Busselton

Government
  - State electorate(s): Vasse
  - Federal division(s): Forrest

Area
  - Total: 13.3 km^{2} (5.1 sq mi)

Population
  - Total(s): 475 (SAL 2021)
- Time zone: UTC+8 (AWST)
- Postcode: 6280

Bovell is a semi-rural suburb of the Western Australian city of Busselton. At the 2021 census, it had a population of 475. The area has been earmarked for future urban development. Bovell contains Geographe Primary School, named after the nearby suburb, which was established in 2002.

The farmhouses Cattle Chosen and Fairlawn were built by the early European settlers John Bussell and John Molloy, respectively, in what is now the suburb of Bovell.
