= Yalyalup, Western Australia =

Suburb of Busselton, Western Australia

Yalyalup
- Suburb
- Interactive map of Yalyalup
- Coordinates: 33°40′S 115°24′E
- Country: Australia
- State: Western Australia
- City: Busselton
- LGA: City of Busselton
- Location: 5 km (3.1 mi) from Busselton

Government
  - State electorate: Vasse
  - Federal division: Forrest

Area
  - Total: 32.2 km^{2} (12.4 sq mi)

Population
  - Total: 2,950 (SAL 2021)
- Time zone: UTC+8 (AWST)
- Postcode: 6280

Yalyalup is a suburb of the Western Australian city of Busselton. At the 2021 census, it had a population of 2,950.

The word "Yalyalup" means "place of many holes" in the local Noongar dialect, being a reduplication of "yal", the Wardandi word for "large hole", plus the -up suffix, meaning "place of". After European settlement the area began to be used for timber-milling; the local mill was reworked using state-of-the-art technology in 1963 and finally closed in 1979. The area has also been used for farming, with the Mullgarnup Aboriginal Mission operating on a farm site for about ten years from 1887, and a state school being open from 1910 to 1921.

The first major estate in the suburb, built by Satterley property Group, was established in 2008. The suburb also contains Georgiana Molloy Anglican School, Busselton Margaret River Airport, and Busselton Cemetery.
