= Busselton =

City in the South West region of Western Australia

Busselton Undalup (Noongar)
- City
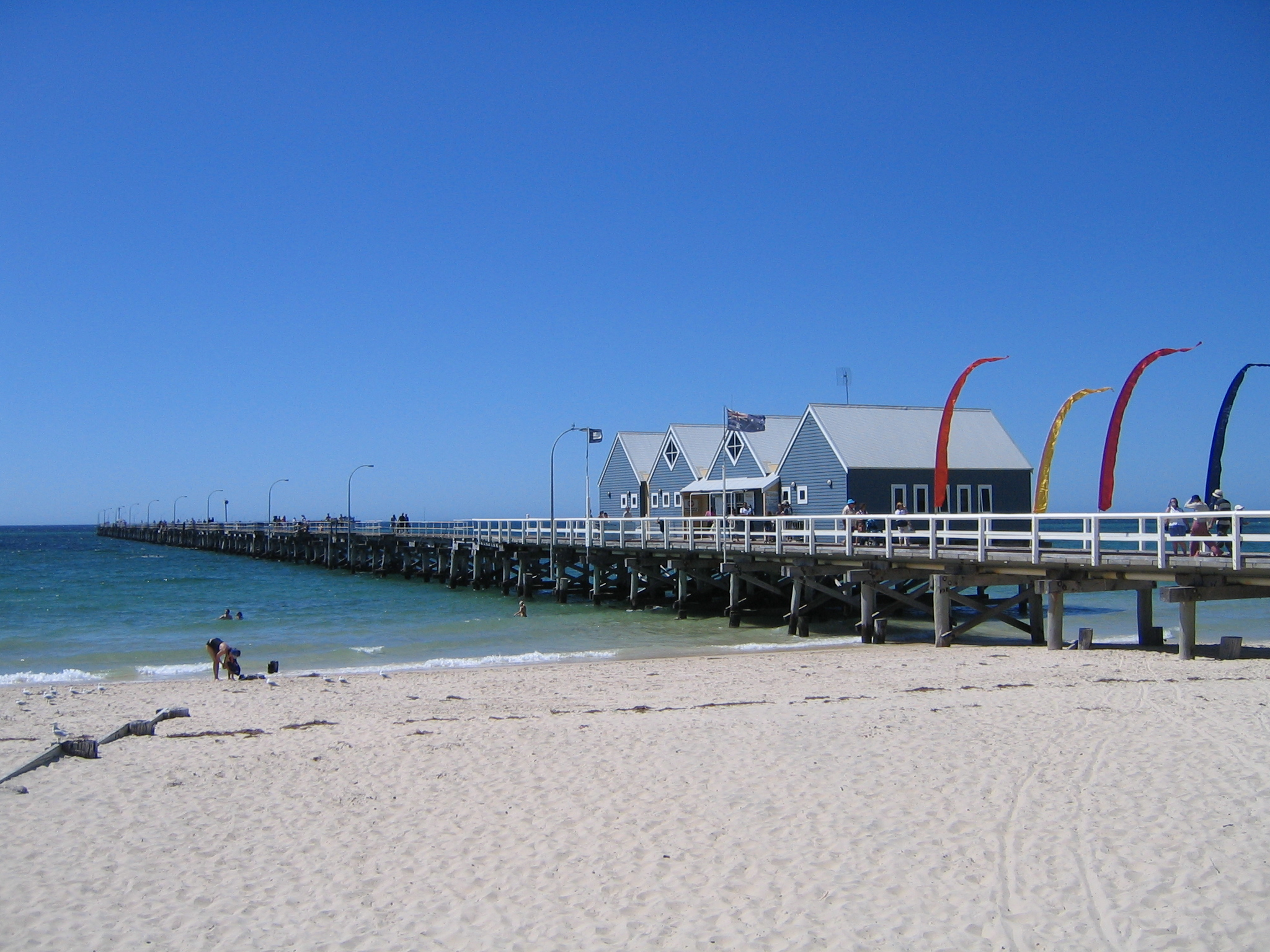
- At 1,841 metres (6,040 ft), the Busselton Jetty is the longest wooden jetty (pier) in the Southern Hemisphere.

- Coordinates: 33°38′52″S 115°20′45″E
- Country: Australia
- State: Western Australia
- LGA: City of Busselton
- Location: 220 km (140 mi) SSW of Perth; 52 km (32 mi) SW of Bunbury; 50 km (31 mi) NE of Margaret River
- Established: 1832

Government
  - State electorate: Vasse
  - Federal division: Forrest

Area
  - Total: 50 km^{2} (19 sq mi)
- Elevation: 4 m (13 ft)

Population
  - Totals: 27,233 (2021 census); 28,651 (statistical areas) (2021)
  - Density: 540/km^{2} (1,410/sq mi)
- Time zone: UTC+8 (AWST)
- Postcode: 6280
- Mean max temp: 23.2 °C (73.8 °F)
- Mean min temp: 10.4 °C (50.7 °F)
- Annual rainfall: 803.2 mm (31.62 in)

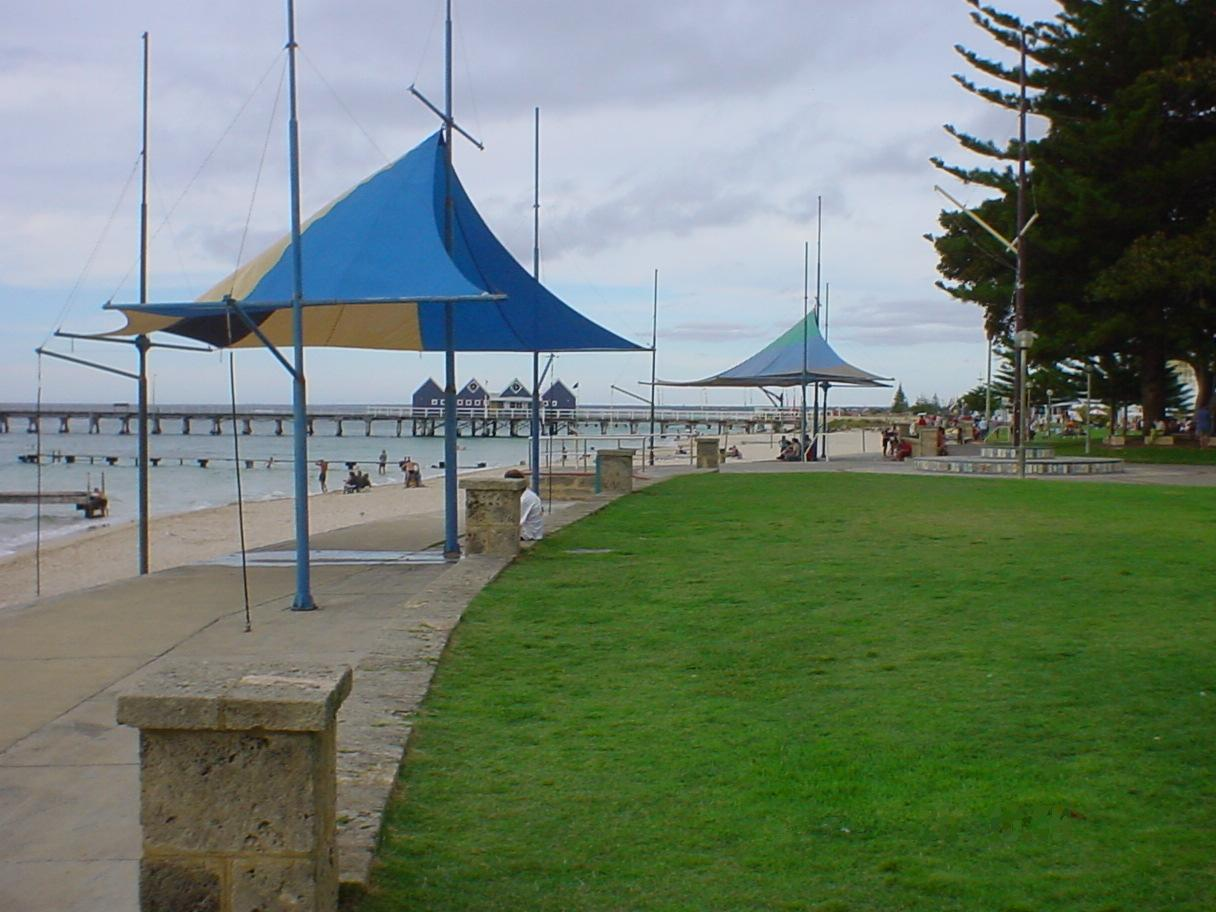
Busselton foreshore

Busselton (Noongar: Undalup) is a city in the South West region of the state of Western Australia approximately 220 km (140 mi) south-west of Perth. Busselton has a long history as a popular holiday destination for Western Australians; however, the closure of the Busselton Port in 1972 and the contemporaneous establishment of the nearby Margaret River wine region have seen tourism become the dominant source of investment and development, supplemented by services and retail. The city is best known for the Busselton Jetty, the longest wooden jetty in the Southern Hemisphere.

== Toponymy ==
Busselton is named after the Bussell family, one of the four groups of first European settlers to take up residence in the area in 1834. The name Busselton was first officially used in June 1835.

The Bussells, who were not consulted about the name's use, had a preference for the name Capel, which would have honoured a relative of theirs in England, Capel Carter. However, the official name Busselton was retained, and a town named Capel was later established to the north of Busselton.

Until the end of the 19th century, the name "The Vasse" was also used for the Busselton area, interchangeably with its official name.

In the Noongar language variety spoken by the local Wadandi people, the name of the area is Undalup, which honours 'Undal', "... a great Wadandi Warrior ..." and leader.

== History ==
=== Pre European settlement and 19th century ===
The Busselton area is part of the Noongar country known as Wadandi Boodja. Before white settlement in 1832, and for at least 40,000 years, the area was home to the Noongar Aboriginal people from the Wardandi and Bibulman language/ancestral groups.

The colonisation of Western Australia in 1829 had a major impact on the life of the Noongar people. Many towns in the Busselton area, such as Wonnerup, Yallingup and Carbunup River, still hold their original Noongar names. The Wonnerup massacre of Wardandi Noongar people by European settlers occurred in the vicinity of Wonnerup in 1841.

The early history of European exploration of the Busselton area focused on the French expedition of 1801 which brought Nicholas Baudin, with his ships Géographe and Naturaliste, to the coast of Western Australia. Baudin named Geographe Bay and Cape Naturaliste after his vessels, and named the river Vasse after a sailor, Thomas Vasse, who was lost as he went overboard and was believed to have drowned.

Busselton was one of the earliest settlements in Western Australia. It was first settled by the Bussell family, George Layman, and the Chapman brothers, who relocated there from their location on the Blackwood River. John Garrett Bussell first visited Busselton in December 1831, describing the land as follows: "The country as we advanced improved rapidly; the ground on which we trod was a vivid green, unsullied with burnt sticks and blackened grass trees". Bussell was granted land in the area in July 1832 and the settlers moved there in April 1834. The Bussells established a cattle station which they named Cattle Chosen, which quickly became one of the most prosperous stations in the colony, and as a result, nearly all of the settlers at Augusta relocated to the area within a few years. A number of settlers established themselves at Wonnerup, and eventually a contingent of troops was stationed there under Lieutenant Henry Bunbury. It was originally intended to locate the townsite at Wonnerup, but the area was low-lying and marshy, and Bunbury considered it unsuitable for a townsite. The present area was then recommended by the Surveyor General, John Septimus Roe.

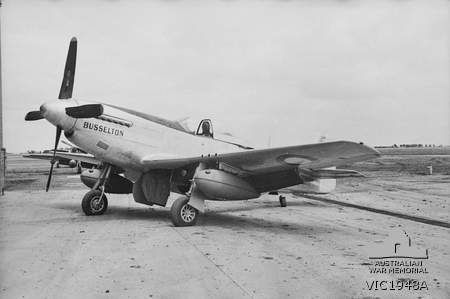
The P-51 Mustang which was given the nickname Busselton at RAAF Base Laverton in 1945

The townsite was planned and surveyed in 1836 by Bunbury and in 1839, by which time it had a population of 77, it was laid out by surveyor Henry Ommaney. This was followed by the opening of the post office in 1842 and St Mary's Church in 1845. In 1847, the town was officially gazetted as Busselton, and the first government-assisted school was opened there in 1848. In the early days of the settlement, and for some time afterwards, the area was visited by whaling ships from the US, France, and England. The Americans in particular traded with the settlers, who gained vital supplies such as iron, flour, and clothing in exchange for fresh food; there was also a trade in smuggled rum and tobacco. The American whalers delivered mail to England via the US, providing an alternative to infrequent government schooners. Visits from foreign whalers declined in the 1860s due to the introduction of fossil fuels to replace whale oil, but a nearby whaling group in what is now part of the Meelup Regional Park, the Castle Bay Whaling Company, survived until 1872.

Being in close proximity to the tall timber country, Busselton soon established itself as a leading port. In 1850, timber was being exported and the small town prospered. Jetties for this purpose were built at Wonnerup, Busselton, and Quindalup. Of these, only the Busselton Jetty remains. During the 1850s, Busselton began to receive convicts who were beginning to arrive in Western Australia; they particularly helped with the timber industry. Western Australia's first railway line, the Ballaarat tramline, was built just north of Busselton at Lockville in 1871, the original engine being known as the Ballaarat steam engine. The privately owned line was used for the transport of timber to the Wonnerup jetty across the Ballaarat Bridge. By the 1880s Busselton had a regular mail and passenger coach service from Perth and Bunbury and, in 1894, a passenger rail service commenced between Busselton and Bunbury on the South Western Railway via Boyanup; it operated until 1985.

=== Federation to present day ===
By the early 20th century, Busselton had become well known as a resort town, aided by the railway along with the 1890s Western Australian gold rushes, which greatly increased the state's population and prosperity. Caves in the area of what is now the Leeuwin-Naturaliste National Park including Yallingup Cave (now Ngilgi Cave) had been discovered and developed, and the strip of coastline between Cape Yallingup and Cape Naturaliste had become popular for camping and seaside holidays. The 1913 Cyclopedia of Western Australia stated:

Busselton which has come to be known as the sanatorium of Western Australia lies within the shelter of Geographe Bay some 30 miles south of Bunbury. Up to some 20 years ago, it was merely a charming country village, with grass-grown streets where arum lilies rioted in profusion. ... Its cool temperate climate, excellent beach and well-established bathing facilities have made it one of the favourite summer resorts. If to these we add the caves reached daily by motor service from the town and, in addition to the scenery, this excellent boating, bathing and fishing, Busselton can probably claim to be the most favoured haunt of the holiday seeker.

Busselton began to grow significantly when the Group Settlement Scheme brought people to the area between 1923 and 1926; nine of the first sixteen groups were organised in the Busselton area. In about 1927, the Flinders Bay branch railway was developed, which connected Busselton to Flinders Bay; it was closed around 1957. In the 1930s, agricultural prices dropped due to the Great Depression, causing many people to leave the area. During World War II, 476 Busselton-born men signed up for service; 20 in the Royal Australian Navy, 110 in the Royal Australian Air Force, and 346 in the Australian Army. The names of the fallen are displayed on the town's war memorial alongside those of World War I in St Marys Park. During the war, Busselton was home to an Air Force training base; remains of the base can still be seen today from the Busselton Bypass Road. A Royal Australian Air Force P-51 Mustang fighter was given the nickname Busselton in honour of the people of Busselton and their support of War Loan fundraising activities.

In the 1950s many facilities for holiday-makers were built west of Busselton and the 1960s saw the beginnings of the professional fishing industry and, in particular, the Margaret River wine region, which greatly increased tourist numbers in and around Busselton. The Busselton port closed in 1972. From the 1970s Busselton began growing particularly as a tourism centre and retirement location. By 1996 it had become one of the fastest-growing areas in Western Australia. In 2012, the Shire of Busselton gained city status.

== Geography ==
Busselton is in the South West region of Western Australia, about 220 kilometres (140 mi) south-west of Perth. The city is composed of a city centre along with the suburbs of Abbey, Ambergate, Bovell, Broadwater, Geographe, Kealy, Vasse, West Busselton, and Yalyalup. It is bordered by Geographe Bay to the north, with urban development traditionally being concentrated on the bay, extending from Abbey in the west to Geographe in the east. Urban development south of this area has traditionally been obstructed by wetlands and estuaries; however, since the 1980s, development has taken place to the south of these waterway systems. The Vasse River flows through the city to the Vasse-Wonnerup Estuary; reserves adjoining this estuary to the north form Busselton's eastern border. The city's western border is formed by The corner of Caves Road and Bussell Highway. Caves Road leads to the nearby town of Dunsborough, which is separated from Busselton by a green belt, notably including the Locke Estate, known locally as the "Holy Mile". Busselton's nearest city is Bunbury which is 52 kilometres (32 mi) north-east of Busselton.

=== Climate ===
Busselton has a borderline warm/hot summer Mediterranean climate (Köppen: Csb/Csa), depending on the recording station used, as the warmest months have mean temperatures around 22 °C (72 °F), the cut-off mark between these two climate types. The Bureau of Meteorology has had three major temperature-recording sites in Busselton: the Busselton Shire office, with temperatures recorded from 1900 to 1975 and rainfall from 1877 to the present, Busselton Town near The Busselton District Hospital site on Mill Road in West Busselton (recording from 1998 to 2011), and the Busselton Margaret River Airport, 6 kilometres (4 mi) east of the Busselton Shire station (recording since 1997). Wind observations have been made at Busselton Jetty since 1997, and temperature observations have been made in the general area at Ludlow, Jarrahwood, and Cape Naturaliste. Summers are generally warm to hot with afternoon sea breezes, with average daily maxima of 28 °C (82 °F) at the shire station and 30 °C (86 °F) at the airport station, and a winter that delivers cooler temperatures of 7 to 18 °C (45 to 64 °F) and wetter weather. The annual average rainfall at the Busselton Shire station is 803.2 millimetres (31.62 in), with the wettest period being from May to September.

Climate data for Busselton Aero (almost all averages and extremes: 1997–2026; humidity: 1997–2010)
Month	Jan	Feb	Mar	Apr	May	Jun	Jul	Aug	Sep	Oct	Nov	Dec	Year
Record high °C (°F)	41.1 (106.0)	40.1 (104.2)	39.0 (102.2)	34.2 (93.6)	29.0 (84.2)	23.6 (74.5)	22.0 (71.6)	24.3 (75.7)	28.8 (83.8)	32.2 (90.0)	38.1 (100.6)	41.4 (106.5)	41.4 (106.5)
Mean maximum °C (°F)	38.3 (100.9)	37.2 (99.0)	35.7 (96.3)	30.1 (86.2)	24.9 (76.8)	21.3 (70.3)	19.9 (67.8)	20.6 (69.1)	23.8 (74.8)	28.6 (83.5)	33.1 (91.6)	36.8 (98.2)	39.0 (102.2)
Mean daily maximum °C (°F)	30.4 (86.7)	30.2 (86.4)	28.0 (82.4)	23.9 (75.0)	20.5 (68.9)	17.9 (64.2)	16.9 (62.4)	17.3 (63.1)	18.6 (65.5)	21.3 (70.3)	25.0 (77.0)	28.3 (82.9)	23.2 (73.8)
Daily mean °C (°F)	22.4 (72.3)	22.5 (72.5)	20.8 (69.4)	17.5 (63.5)	14.8 (58.6)	12.8 (55.0)	12.0 (53.6)	12.3 (54.1)	13.2 (55.8)	15.0 (59.0)	17.9 (64.2)	20.4 (68.7)	16.8 (62.2)
Mean daily minimum °C (°F)	14.3 (57.7)	14.8 (58.6)	13.7 (56.7)	11.1 (52.0)	9.0 (48.2)	7.7 (45.9)	7.0 (44.6)	7.3 (45.1)	7.9 (46.2)	8.7 (47.7)	10.7 (51.3)	12.5 (54.5)	10.4 (50.7)
Mean minimum °C (°F)	7.4 (45.3)	8.1 (46.6)	6.8 (44.2)	4.9 (40.8)	3.5 (38.3)	2.1 (35.8)	1.6 (34.9)	1.9 (35.4)	2.3 (36.1)	2.9 (37.2)	4.4 (39.9)	5.9 (42.6)	0.9 (33.6)
Record low °C (°F)	4.0 (39.2)	5.3 (41.5)	3.1 (37.6)	3.0 (37.4)	0.0 (32.0)	−1.0 (30.2)	−0.4 (31.3)	0.0 (32.0)	0.3 (32.5)	0.8 (33.4)	0.9 (33.6)	2.2 (36.0)	−1.0 (30.2)
Average precipitation mm (inches)	12.0 (0.47)	6.0 (0.24)	20.5 (0.81)	37.3 (1.47)	95.0 (3.74)	123.3 (4.85)	139.4 (5.49)	110.2 (4.34)	73.2 (2.88)	33.5 (1.32)	22.4 (0.88)	8.6 (0.34)	686.4 (27.02)
Average precipitation days	2.2	2.2	4.6	8.9	13.9	18.3	20.6	19.1	15.9	10.4	6.4	3.5	126.0
Average afternoon relative humidity (%)	35	36	40	50	59	68	68	66	63	54	45	39	52
Average dew point °C (°F)	10.4 (50.7)	11.1 (52.0)	10.7 (51.3)	10.8 (51.4)	10.6 (51.1)	10.1 (50.2)	9.3 (48.7)	9.2 (48.6)	9.1 (48.4)	9.3 (48.7)	9.5 (49.1)	9.8 (49.6)	10.0 (50.0)
Source: Australian Bureau of Meteorology

Climate data for Busselton Town (most averages and extremes: 1998–2011; humidity: 1998–2010)
Month	Jan	Feb	Mar	Apr	May	Jun	Jul	Aug	Sep	Oct	Nov	Dec	Year
Record high °C (°F)	38.9 (102.0)	39.9 (103.8)	37.3 (99.1)	33.0 (91.4)	27.9 (82.2)	22.2 (72.0)	21.0 (69.8)	21.3 (70.3)	27.7 (81.9)	32.7 (90.9)	34.4 (93.9)	37.1 (98.8)	39.9 (103.8)
Mean maximum °C (°F)	36.0 (96.8)	36.5 (97.7)	34.4 (93.9)	29.0 (84.2)	24.5 (76.1)	21.0 (69.8)	19.7 (67.5)	20.1 (68.2)	22.8 (73.0)	26.7 (80.1)	31.0 (87.8)	34.7 (94.5)	37.3 (99.1)
Mean daily maximum °C (°F)	29.3 (84.7)	29.3 (84.7)	27.3 (81.1)	23.5 (74.3)	20.6 (69.1)	18.2 (64.8)	17.1 (62.8)	17.5 (63.5)	18.4 (65.1)	20.9 (69.6)	24.3 (75.7)	27.1 (80.8)	22.8 (73.0)
Daily mean °C (°F)	22.1 (71.8)	22.4 (72.3)	20.7 (69.3)	17.7 (63.9)	15.5 (59.9)	13.5 (56.3)	12.6 (54.7)	12.9 (55.2)	13.7 (56.7)	15.3 (59.5)	18.1 (64.6)	20.2 (68.4)	17.1 (62.7)
Mean daily minimum °C (°F)	14.8 (58.6)	15.5 (59.9)	14.1 (57.4)	11.8 (53.2)	10.4 (50.7)	8.8 (47.8)	8.0 (46.4)	8.3 (46.9)	8.9 (48.0)	9.7 (49.5)	11.9 (53.4)	13.2 (55.8)	11.3 (52.3)
Mean minimum °C (°F)	9.0 (48.2)	9.8 (49.6)	7.9 (46.2)	6.0 (42.8)	5.1 (41.2)	3.3 (37.9)	2.8 (37.0)	2.8 (37.0)	3.8 (38.8)	4.9 (40.8)	6.4 (43.5)	7.3 (45.1)	2.1 (35.8)
Record low °C (°F)	6.8 (44.2)	7.9 (46.2)	4.7 (40.5)	4.3 (39.7)	2.3 (36.1)	0.4 (32.7)	0.9 (33.6)	1.2 (34.2)	2.1 (35.8)	3.7 (38.7)	3.3 (37.9)	5.2 (41.4)	0.4 (32.7)
Average precipitation mm (inches)	14.6 (0.57)	4.0 (0.16)	11.3 (0.44)	40.4 (1.59)	93.8 (3.69)	133.6 (5.26)	140.8 (5.54)	113.0 (4.45)	80.7 (3.18)	33.5 (1.32)	25.0 (0.98)	9.6 (0.38)	704.6 (27.74)
Average precipitation days	2.9	2.5	4.4	9.4	13.5	17.0	19.6	18.9	16.4	10.0	6.7	3.8	125.1
Average afternoon relative humidity (%)	43	44	48	56	62	66	67	65	62	56	50	44	55
Average dew point °C (°F)	12.7 (54.9)	13.2 (55.8)	12.6 (54.7)	12.2 (54.0)	11.6 (52.9)	10.2 (50.4)	9.4 (48.9)	9.3 (48.7)	9.2 (48.6)	9.7 (49.5)	11.0 (51.8)	11.5 (52.7)	11.1 (51.9)
Source: Bureau of Meteorology

Climate data for Busselton shire (temperature daily averages: 1900–1975); temperature & monthly average extremes: 1957–1975; rainfall: 1877–2026)
Month	Jan	Feb	Mar	Apr	May	Jun	Jul	Aug	Sep	Oct	Nov	Dec	Year
Record high °C (°F)	38.5 (101.3)	39.1 (102.4)	38.3 (100.9)	31.6 (88.9)	26.1 (79.0)	21.7 (71.1)	20.0 (68.0)	22.8 (73.0)	27.0 (80.6)	32.2 (90.0)	35.3 (95.5)	38.5 (101.3)	39.9 (103.8)
Mean maximum °C (°F)	36.1 (97.0)	36.0 (96.8)	33.6 (92.5)	28.0 (82.4)	23.4 (74.1)	20.1 (68.2)	18.8 (65.8)	19.8 (67.6)	22.6 (72.7)	27.1 (80.8)	30.6 (87.1)	34.9 (94.8)	37.0 (98.6)
Mean daily maximum °C (°F)	28.5 (83.3)	28.4 (83.1)	26.1 (79.0)	22.8 (73.0)	19.3 (66.7)	17.3 (63.1)	16.3 (61.3)	16.7 (62.1)	18.1 (64.6)	20.1 (68.2)	23.6 (74.5)	26.5 (79.7)	22.0 (71.6)
Daily mean °C (°F)	21.2 (70.2)	21.2 (70.2)	19.4 (66.9)	16.8 (62.2)	14.3 (57.7)	12.8 (55.0)	11.9 (53.4)	12.1 (53.8)	13.3 (55.9)	14.7 (58.5)	17.3 (63.1)	19.5 (67.1)	16.2 (61.2)
Mean daily minimum °C (°F)	13.8 (56.8)	14.0 (57.2)	12.7 (54.9)	10.7 (51.3)	9.3 (48.7)	8.3 (46.9)	7.5 (45.5)	7.5 (45.5)	8.4 (47.1)	9.3 (48.7)	10.9 (51.6)	12.5 (54.5)	10.4 (50.7)
Mean minimum °C (°F)	9.1 (48.4)	8.6 (47.5)	6.9 (44.4)	5.1 (41.2)	4.1 (39.4)	3.6 (38.5)	2.9 (37.2)	3.3 (37.9)	3.7 (38.7)	4.4 (39.9)	5.7 (42.3)	8.2 (46.8)	1.7 (35.1)
Record low °C (°F)	6.7 (44.1)	6.1 (43.0)	4.6 (40.3)	2.2 (36.0)	0.4 (32.7)	0.9 (33.6)	1.1 (34.0)	1.1 (34.0)	0.7 (33.3)	1.0 (33.8)	3.3 (37.9)	5.6 (42.1)	0.4 (32.7)
Average precipitation mm (inches)	10.0 (0.39)	10.4 (0.41)	21.0 (0.83)	41.6 (1.64)	112.4 (4.43)	164.2 (6.46)	160.6 (6.32)	114.6 (4.51)	73.9 (2.91)	48.7 (1.92)	24.3 (0.96)	12.5 (0.49)	803.2 (31.62)
Average precipitation days	2.5	2.4	4.1	7.9	14.3	18.2	20.6	18.7	15.2	11.6	6.8	3.5	125.8
Source: Bureau of Meteorology

== Demographics ==
The 2021 Australian census recorded Busselton's population as 27,233, 67.0% of the population of the City of Busselton local government area, which was 40,640. The 2021 census also recorded Busselton's median age as 45, higher than the national average of 38. Australian-born residents made up 75.9% of Busselton's population, followed by those born in England (7.8%), New Zealand (2.3%), South Africa (1.1%), Scotland (0.7%), and the Philippines (0.5%). English was the only language spoken at home by 89.5% of residents, with the next most common languages being Afrikaans and German (0.5%), Italian and Hazaragi (0.3%), and French (0.2%). The most common industry for employed people in Busselton was listed as "accommodation" at 3.7%, compared to the national average of 0.9%; others were cafes and restaurants" (3.6%), "supermarket and grocery stores" (3.5%), "iron ore mining" on a fly-in fly-out basis (3.2%), and "hospitals (except psychiatric hospitals)" (3.2%).

At the 2021 census the combined population of the Busselton East and Busselton West statistical areas was 28651. It has been estimated that by 2050 Busselton's population will be between 50,000 and 70,000, with the local government area containing between 70,000 and 100,000 people.

== Transport ==
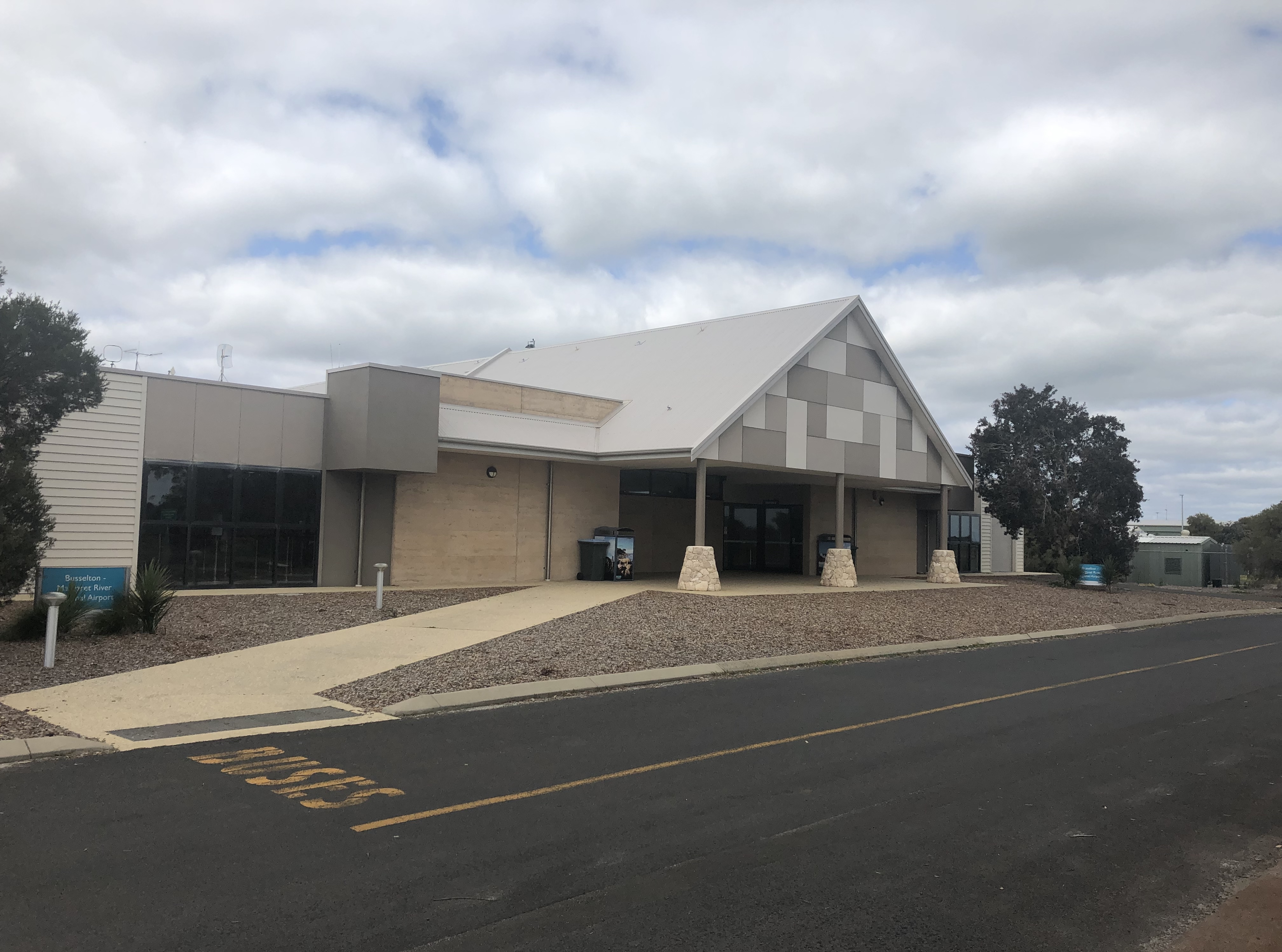
Busselton Margaret River Airport

Bussell Highway links Busselton with Bunbury and Augusta, while the Vasse Highway goes from Busselton to Pemberton and beyond. Caves Road provides an alternative scenic route from Busselton to Augusta; Sues Road is another alternative route via the Brockman Highway. In December 2000, the 10.7 kilometre Busselton Bypass opened.

The TransBusselton town bus service has been operated by Swan Transit with three routes since 2015. South West Coach Lines and Transwa provide coach services for connections to other south west towns and Perth. Busselton is served by Busselton Margaret River Airport.

== Economy ==
The main industries of the Busselton area are services (e.g. retail, wholesale, manufacturing, and recreation). The economic focus of the region has gradually shifted from agriculture as the population has increased and tourism has grown in the district.

=== Tourism ===
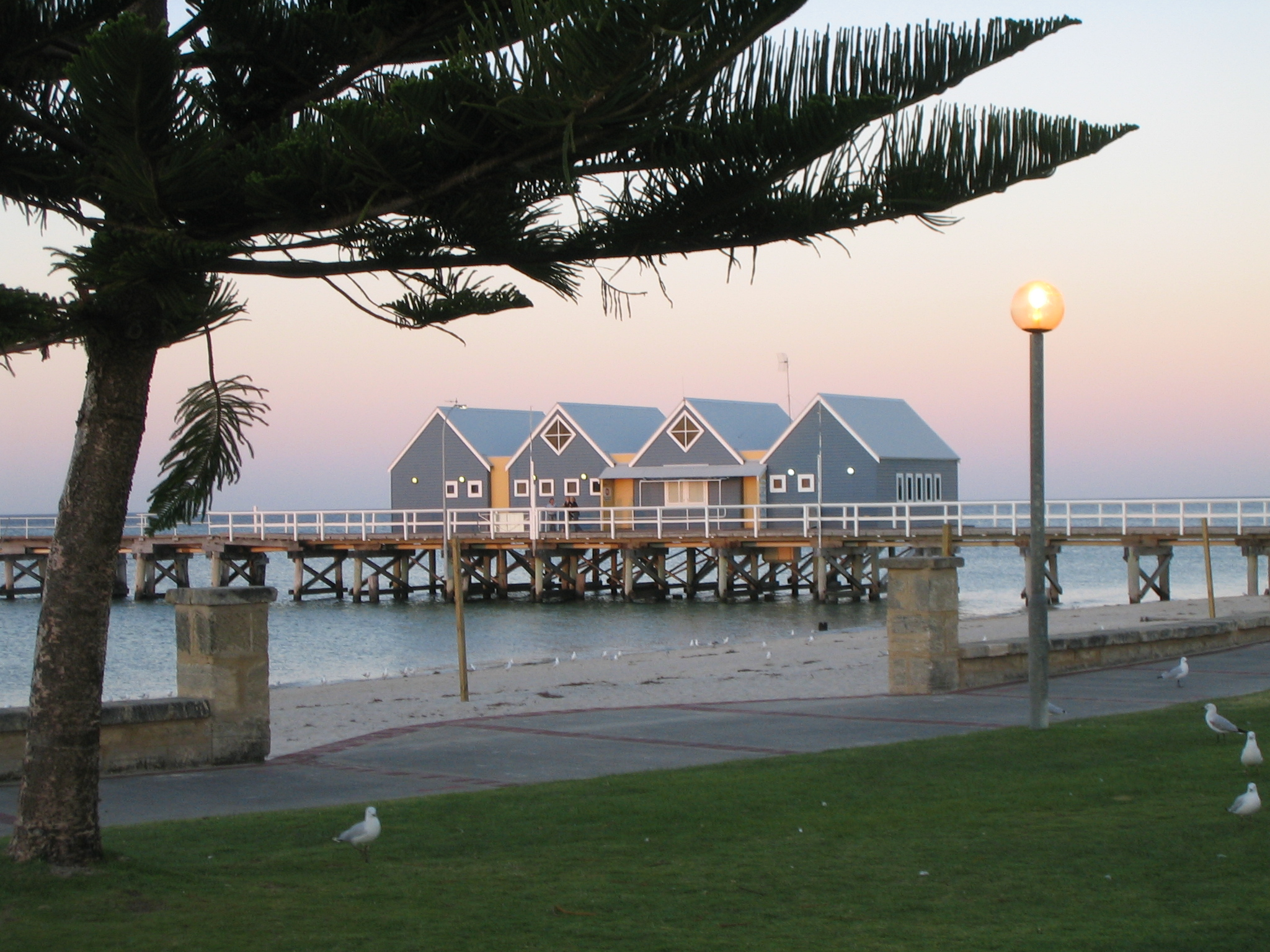
Busselton foreshore at sunset

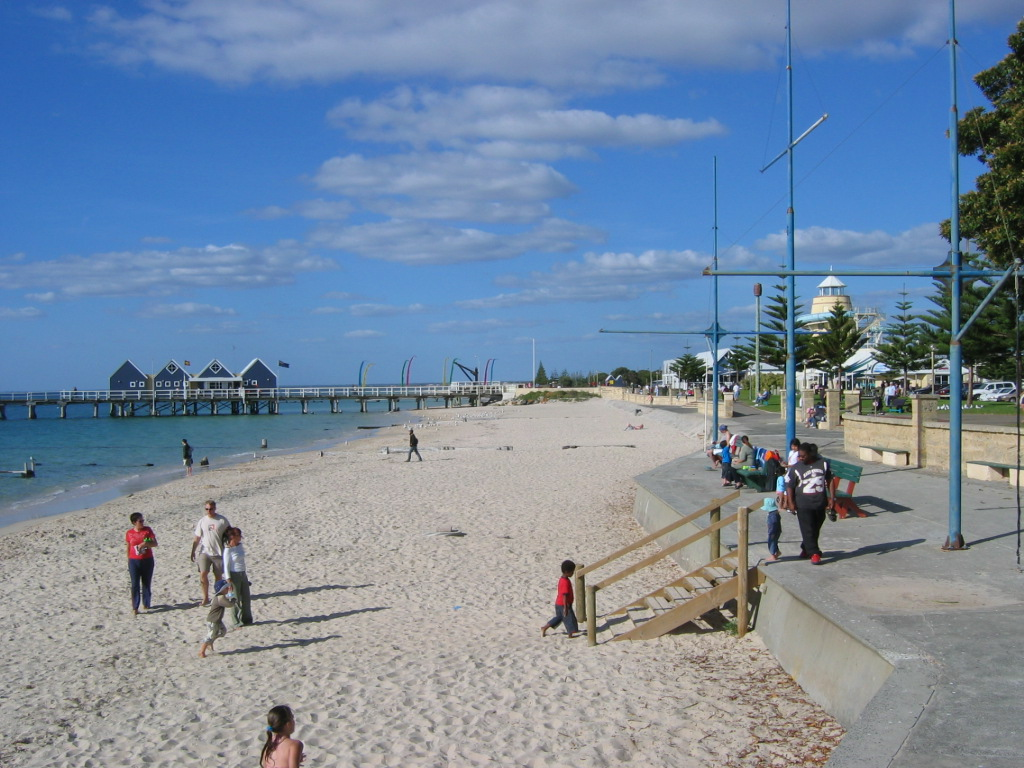
Busselton Beach

Many sites of interest are in the Busselton region. Busselton Beach is known for the turquoise-coloured, tranquil waters and white sands.

The City of Busselton markets itself as "The Events Capital of WA".

==== Busselton Jetty ====
Busselton is home to the longest wooden jetty (pier) in the Southern Hemisphere, stretching 1,841 metres (6,040 ft) out to sea. Construction of the jetty began in 1864 and it was continually extended until the 1960s, when it reached its current length. It was closed to shipping in 1972, and maintenance was discontinued for a time. Following major damage caused by Cyclone Alby in 1978 and a fire in 1999, it was restored and improved. Since 2003, the jetty has offered visitors a tourist train ride, an underwater observatory, and an interpretive centre.

==== Wonnerup House ====
The current Wonnerup House was built in 1859 by the Layman family (original settlers). The original building built between 1837 and 1841 was destroyed by fire in 1858. The complex also includes the dairy and kitchen, which antedate the main house (and survived the fire of 1858 because they were separate buildings). Over the road are the Teacher's House (1885) and School (1873). Since 1973, the National Trust of Australia has operated the property as a museum open to the public.

==== Old Butter Factory/Busselton Museum ====
The Old Butter Factory was built in 1918 by the government Department of Agriculture to replace a previous privately owned dairy, Western Australia's first butter factory and creamery, that was established in 1898. In 1926 the factory was sold to South-West Dairy Produce Co-operative, which was later renamed "Sunny West" and merged into Wesfarmers. The factory also operated as an ice works for local residents and fishermen before the widespread availability of mechanical refrigeration. It ceased butter-making operations in 1952 and became a cream depot and dried milk plant, then a truck depot. In 1974 it was sold to the Shire of Busselton, which leased most of the building to the Busselton Historical Society; they opened the Busselton Museum there in 1975. It was listed on the state's Register of Heritage Places in 2002. In March 2018, the building was heavily damaged by fire. the outside areas were re-opened in January 2019 and the rest of the building was opened in December 2020.

==== St Mary's (Church of England) ====
St Mary's (Church of England), built in 1844–1845, is allegedly the oldest stone church in Western Australia. John Molloy and John Garrett Bussell were the main forces behind the construction of the church. The church was not consecrated until 1848 and a clergyman was not attracted to the region for another decade. Alongside the church is a graveyard; some of the graves date back to 1841 – before the building of the church.

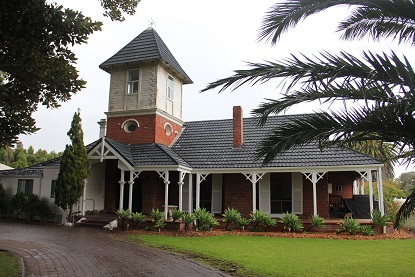
Ithaca

==== Ithaca (Villa Carlotta) ====
Ithaca (formerly known as Villa Carlotta) is located at 110 Adelaide St, Busselton, and was built by Frank Backhouse in 1896. Ithaca is listed on the state's Register of Heritage Places in recognition of its significant historical and community values. Ithaca has a two-storey tower and was originally built as a private residence; in 1904, Ithaca was acquired by Sisters of Our Lady of the Missions for use as a Catholic convent. Subsequently, it has been a school and a hotel, and now is a motel.

==== Weld Hall ====
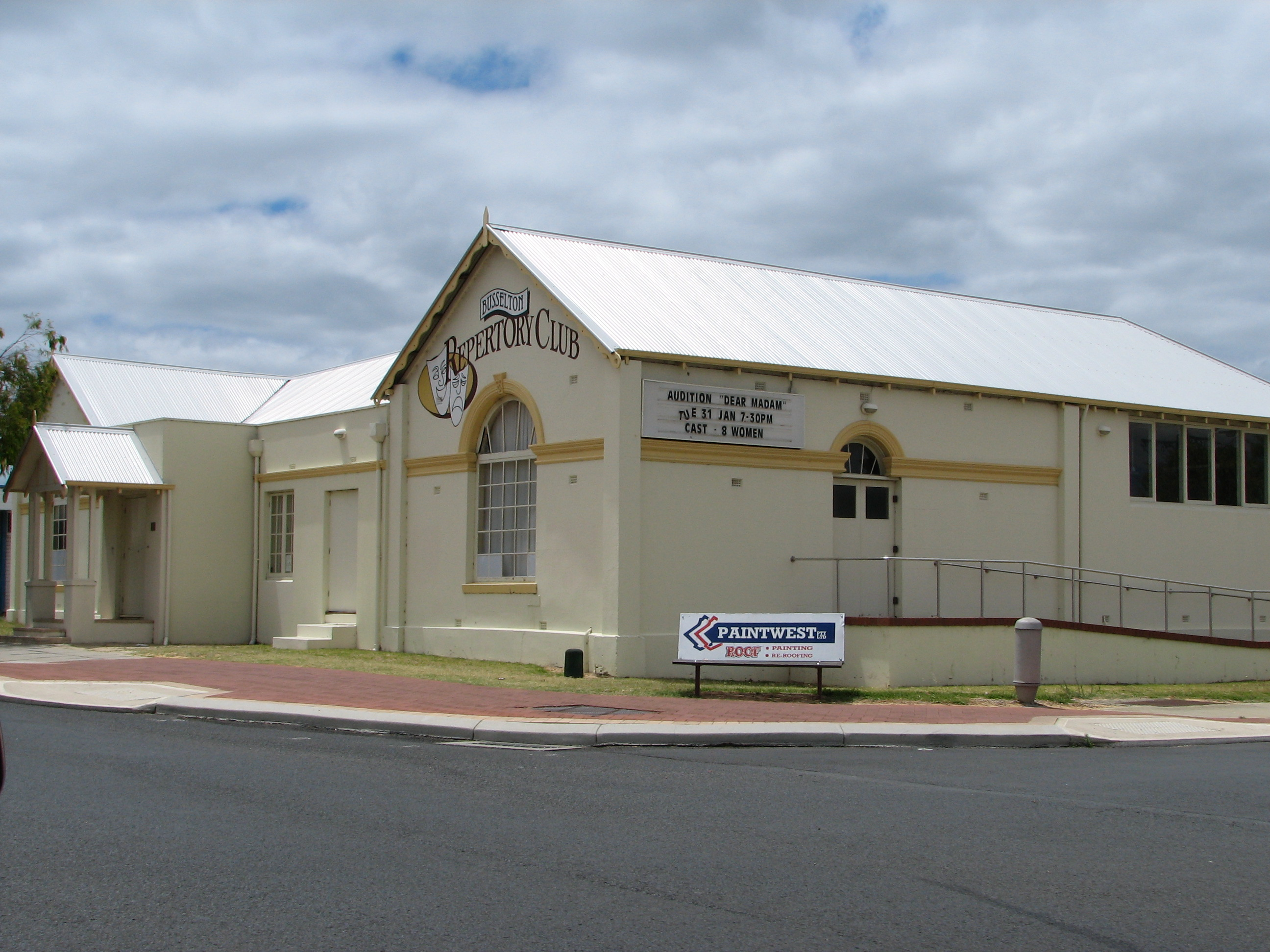
Weld Hall

Weld Hall located on the corner of Queen and Adelaide St was built in 1881. In August 2001, the Western Australian government announced that Weld Hall had been listed on the Register of Heritage Places in recognition of its significant historical and cultural value to the local community. The hall is a single-storey brick building with a galvanised roof, and is constructed in a simplified Victorian Italianate style; it is one of the oldest remaining structures in the town.

==== Augusta-Busselton Heritage Trail ====
The trail retraces the Pioneer Route from Augusta to Busselton taken by the original settlers in the 1800s. It is over 100 km long, starting at the jetty and finishing in Augusta.

== Facilities ==
=== Education ===
There are nine schools in the Busselton area, six of them government, which serve either primary or high-school students, and three private, which serve both. There are four primary schools (Busselton Primary School, West Busselton Primary School, Geographe Primary School, and Vasse Primary school). The two government high schools are Busselton Senior High School and Cape Naturaliste College. The three private schools are St Mary MacKillop College, Cornerstone Christian College, and Georgiana Molloy Anglican School. The only local tertiary institution in the area is the South Regional TAFE. Busselton contains a long-distance learning hub for Edith Cowan University.

=== Health ===
Busselton's first convict hospital was built starting in 1869. A new two-storey hospital was constructed in 1896 and operated until 1978. During the early 20th century, there were smaller hospitals mainly used for maternity, such as Nurse Kilerby's Maternity Hospital (c. 1914–1917) and the Lady Campion Hostel (1926–1947), which is on the state's Register of Heritage Places. In 1978, the main hospital was replaced by Busselton District Hospital on Mill Road, which in turn was re-built and opened as the Busselton Health Campus on the same site in 2015. Busselton is also known for the Busselton Health Study, which was founded in 1966 by Kevin Cullen.

== Recreation and culture ==
=== Sports ===
Busselton has a leisure centre, a golf club, tennis courts, a skate park, and several outdoor areas on which sport is played. The Busselton Football Club plays in the South West Football League.

Notable sporting events in Busselton include:

- Geographe Bay Race Week
- Busselton Festival of Triathlon
- Ironman Western Australia Triathlon Busselton
- The Busselton Jetty Swim
- Australian HPV Super Series, Busselton race

=== Arts ===
Busselton contains the ArtGeo Cultural Complex, which includes an art gallery, theatre, artist's workshop, and an arts and crafts store. It also contains the Busselton Court House and Police Complex, which has an old courthouse, post office, and bond store. Some of the structures in the courthouse and police complex were built by Henry Yelverton in 1860–1861, while a newer courtroom was built in 1897 by George Temple-Poole; this group of buildings was classified by the National Trust of Australia in 1973 and added to the state's Register of Heritage Places in 1993. The ArtGeo Gallery is housed in a former Agricultural Bank of Western Australia building, constructed in 1931, and added to the heritage register in 1999. The complex also contains life-sized sculptures by Fremantle sculptor Greg James depicting the cultural heritage of Busselton; miniature versions (maquettes) of the works are in the City of Busselton office. The six sculptures, unveiled between 2014 and 2019, are Whaler's Wife, Timber Worker, John Garrett Bussell, Spanish Settler (referring to nearby Yoongarillup), Gaywal (an Aboriginal leader at the time of European settlement), and Pioneer Woman.

The prestigious annual CinefestOZ film festival screens in Busselton, along with other regional centres.

After two decades of delays and planning, a new $38 million Performing Arts Centre commenced construction in February 2022. Named "Saltwater" in acknowledgement of the Wardandi people, the centre is opened in May 2026.

=== Other events ===
Other notable events in Busselton include:

- Festival of Busselton
- Make Smoking History Forest Rally
- Busselton Agricultural Show (since 1861)
- South West Craft Beer Festival

=== Media ===
Busselton is served by two local weekly newspapers; the Busselton Dunsborough Mail (Wednesday) and the Busselton Dunsborough Times (Friday). The West Australian is available from Monday to Saturday and the Sunday Times is available on Sundays.

Busselton is serviced by three commercial television channels, Seven (formerly GWN7), WIN (Nine), and 10. The public-broadcast TV channels ABC and SBS are also available in the region.

== Sister city ==
- Sugito, Saitama, Japan

== Governance ==
=== Local government ===
Busselton is located in the 1,454 km^{2} (561 sq mi) City of Busselton, which also includes the towns of Dunsborough and Yallingup.

=== State government ===
2021 state election
Liberal	44.1%
Labor	34.0%
Greens	10.4%
National	4.3%

2022 federal election
Liberal	43.1%
Labor	27.4%
Greens	13.4%
One Nation	5.3%

Busselton is located in the Lower House seat of Vasse, represented by Libby Mettam (MLA), who holds the blue-ribbon seat for the Liberal Party. In the Upper House, Busselton is within the South West Region.

=== Federal government ===
Busselton is located in the Liberal seat of Forrest. The seat is currently represented by Ben Small, who has held it since 2025.

== Notable people ==
- Stewart Bovell, politician
- Sharon Buchanan, hockey player, Olympic gold medallist
- Taj Burrow, surfer
- John Bussell, founder of Busselton
- Kevin Cullen, doctor and winemaker
- Edmund Drake-Brockman, soldier, statesman, and judge
- Joseph Strelley Harris, pastoralist, Busselton's second magistrat
- Barry House, politician
- Sean Keenan, actor
- Nina Kennedy, pole-vaulter, Olympic gold medallist
- Georgiana Molloy, early settler, botanical collector
- John Molloy, early settler, Busselton's first magistrate, husband of Georgiana Molloy
- Lance Morris, cricketer
- Scott Sunderland, cyclist
- Taylor Worth, archer
