= Electoral results for the district of Sussex =

Western Australian district election results

This is a list of electoral results for the Electoral district of Sussex in Western Australian state elections.

== Members for Sussex ==
Member	Party	Term
Joseph Cookworthy	Non-aligned	1890–1897
Ernest Locke	Ministerial	1897–1901
Henry Yelverton	Ministerial	1901–1904
Frank Wilson	Independent	1904–1905
Frank Wilson	Ministerial	1905–1911
Frank Wilson	Liberal	1911–1917
Frank Wilson	Independent	1917
William Pickering	Country	1917–1923
William Pickering	Country (ECP)	1923–1924
George Barnard	Nationalist	1924–1933
Edmund Brockman	Nationalist	1933–1938
William Willmott	Nationalist	1938–1945
William Willmott	Liberal	1945–1947
Stewart Bovell	Liberal	1947–1949
Stewart Bovell	LCL	1949–1950

== Election results ==
=== Elections in the 1940s ===
1947 Sussex state by-election
Party	Candidate	Votes	%	±%
Liberal	Stewart Bovell	2,352	59.7	−4.6
Independent Liberal	Robert Falkingham	1,097	27.9	+27.9
Independent Labor	John Blake	490	12.4	+12.4
Total formal votes		3,939	96.7	−2.2
Informal votes		136	3.3	+2.2
Turnout		4,075	87.5	+0.3
Liberal hold		Swing	N/A	

- Preferences were not distributed.

1947 Western Australian state election: Sussex
Party	Candidate	Votes	%	±%
Liberal	William Willmott	2,531	64.3	+2.0
Labor	Robert Hearne	1,407	35.7	−2.0
Total formal votes		3,938	98.9	+1.0
Informal votes		44	1.1	−1.0
Turnout		3,982	87.2	−0.1
Liberal hold		Swing	+2.0	

1943 Western Australian state election: Sussex
Party	Candidate	Votes	%	±%
Nationalist	William Willmott	2,060	62.3	+20.7
Labor	Albert Morgan	1,248	37.7	+9.2
Total formal votes		3,308	97.9	−0.7
Informal votes		70	2.1	+0.7
Turnout		3,378	87.3	−8.3
Nationalist hold		Swing	−0.4	

=== Elections in the 1930s ===
1939 Western Australian state election: Sussex
Party	Candidate	Votes	%	±%
Nationalist	William Willmott	1,445	41.6	−28.5
Labor	Albert Morgan	994	28.5	+28.5
Country	Robert Falkingham	689	19.7	+19.7
Independent Country	William Morris	355	10.2	+10.2
Total formal votes		3,493	98.6	−0.1
Informal votes		50	1.4	+0.1
Turnout		3,543	95.6	+11.2
Two-party-preferred result
Nationalist	William Willmott	2,189	62.7	
Labor	Albert Morgan	1,304	37.3	
Nationalist hold		Swing	N/A	

1938 Sussex state by-election
Party	Candidate	Votes	%	±%
Nationalist	William Willmott	848	28.0	−42.1
Labor	Herbert Bartlett	799	26.4	+26.4
Country	Walter Noakes	452	14.9	+14.9
Ind. Nationalist	Robert Falkingham	390	12.9	−5.0
Ind. Nationalist	William Pickering	277	9.2	+9.2
Nationalist	Robert Reading	261	8.6	+8.6
Total formal votes		3,027	98.1	−0.6
Informal votes		60	1.9	+0.6
Turnout		3,087	90.5	+6.1
Two-party-preferred result
Nationalist	William Willmott	2,007	66.3	N/A
Labor	Herbert Bartlett	1,020	33.7	+33.7
Nationalist hold		Swing	N/A	

1936 Western Australian state election: Sussex
Party	Candidate	Votes	%	±%
Nationalist	Edmund Brockman	2,014	70.1	+45.0
Ind. Nationalist	Robert Falkingham	514	17.9	+2.2
Ind. Nationalist	Percy Bignell	345	12.0	+12.0
Total formal votes		2,873	98.7	+0.5
Informal votes		37	1.3	−0.5
Turnout		2,910	84.4	−10.5
Nationalist hold		Swing	N/A	

- Preferences were not distributed.

1933 Western Australian state election: Sussex
Party	Candidate	Votes	%	±%
Labor	Herbert Swinbourne	1,364	36.2	+1.3
Nationalist	Edmund Brockman	946	25.1	+25.1
Nationalist	George Barnard	865	23.0	−18.3
Independent	Robert Falkingham	591	15.7	+15.7
Total formal votes		3,766	98.2	−0.9
Informal votes		70	1.8	+0.9
Turnout		3,836	94.9	+5.2
Two-party-preferred result
Nationalist	Edmund Brockman	2,033	54.0	−7.6
Labor	Herbert Swinbourne	1,733	46.0	+7.6
Nationalist hold		Swing	−7.6	

1930 Western Australian state election: Sussex
Party	Candidate	Votes	%	±%
Nationalist	George Barnard	1,362	41.3	
Labor	John Close	1,150	34.9	
Nationalist	Benjamin Prowse	784	23.8	
Total formal votes		3,296	99.1	
Informal votes		31	0.9	
Turnout		3,327	89.7	
Two-party-preferred result
Nationalist	George Barnard	2,029	61.6	
Labor	John Close	1,267	38.4	
Nationalist hold		Swing		

=== Elections in the 1920s ===
1927 Western Australian state election: Sussex
Party	Candidate	Votes	%	±%
Nationalist	George Barnard	1,469	42.2	+0.5
Labor	John Tonkin	1,226	35.3	+5.6
Country	William Pickering	782	22.5	−6.1
Total formal votes		3,477	98.3	−0.3
Informal votes		59	1.7	+0.3
Turnout		3,536	77.3	+7.6
Two-party-preferred result
Nationalist	George Barnard	2,052	59.0	+1.1
Labor	John Tonkin	1,425	41.0	−1.1
Nationalist hold		Swing	+1.1	

1924 Western Australian state election: Sussex
Party	Candidate	Votes	%	±%
Nationalist	George Barnard	1,076	41.7	+17.3
Labor	Thomas Lowry	767	29.7	+29.7
Executive Country	William Pickering	739	28.6	+28.6
Total formal votes		2,582	98.6	+0.5
Informal votes		36	1.4	−0.5
Turnout		2,618	69.7	−8.7
Two-party-preferred result
Nationalist	George Barnard	1,496	57.9	+13.5
Labor	Thomas Lowry	1,086	42.1	+42.1
Nationalist gain from Country		Swing	N/A	

1921 Western Australian state election: Sussex
Party	Candidate	Votes	%	±%
Country	William Pickering	572	39.9	−10.3
Nationalist	George William Barnard	350	24.4	−25.4
Country	Benjamin Prowse	222	15.5	+15.5
Country	Arthur Heppingstone	152	10.6	+10.6
Nationalist	Valentine Mitchell	113	7.9	+7.9
Independent	Walter Finlayson	26	1.8	+1.8
Total formal votes		1,435	98.1	−1.2
Informal votes		27	1.9	+1.2
Turnout		1,462	78.4	+9.3
Two-candidate-preferred result
Country	William Pickering	798	55.6	+5.4
Nationalist	George Barnard	637	44.4	−5.4
Country hold		Swing	+5.4	

=== Elections in the 1910s ===
1917 Western Australian state election: Sussex
Party	Candidate	Votes	%	±%
National Country	William Pickering	607	50.2	+34.0
National Liberal	Frank Wilson	603	49.8	+6.4
Total formal votes		1,210	99.3	+1.3
Informal votes		9	0.7	–1.3
Turnout		1,219	69.1	+2.5
National Country gain from National Liberal		Swing	N/A	

1914 Western Australian state election: Sussex
Party	Candidate	Votes	%	±%
Liberal	Frank Wilson	763	43.4	−16.2
Labor	John Blair	709	40.4	0.0
Country	William Pickering	285	16.2	+16.2
Total formal votes		1,757	98.0	−1.5
Informal votes		36	2.0	+1.5
Turnout		1,793	66.6	−3.8
Two-party-preferred result
Liberal	Frank Wilson	999	56.9	−2.7
Labor	John Blair	758	43.1	+2.7
Liberal hold		Swing	−2.7	

1911 Western Australian state election: Sussex
Party	Candidate	Votes	%	±%
Ministerialist	Frank Wilson	943	59.6	
Labor	John Parke	638	40.4	
Total formal votes		1,581	99.5	
Informal votes		8	0.5	
Turnout		1,589	70.4	
Ministerialist hold		Swing		

=== Elections in the 1900s ===
1908 Western Australian state election: Sussex
Party	Candidate	Votes	%	±%
Ministerialist	Frank Wilson	574	53.6	−22.9
Labour	William Thomas	497	46.4	+46.4
Total formal votes		1,071	99.6	+2.6
Informal votes		4	0.4	−2.6
Turnout		1,075	88.1	+15.6
Ministerialist hold		Swing	N/A	

1905 Western Australian state election: Sussex
Party	Candidate	Votes	%	±%
Ministerialist	Frank Wilson	520	76.5	+8.3
Ministerialist	James Shekleton	160	23.5	+23.5
Total formal votes		680	97.0	n/a
Informal votes		21	3.0	n/a
Turnout		701	72.5	n/a
Ministerialist hold		Swing	N/A	

1904 Western Australian state election: Sussex
Party	Candidate	Votes	%	±%
Independent	Frank Wilson	473	51.9	+51.9
Ministerialist	Ernest Locke	438	48.1	+13.1
Total formal votes		911	98.4	–1.1
Informal votes		15	1.6	+1.1
Turnout		926	83.7	+20.4
Independent gain from Ministerialist		Swing	+51.9	

1901 Western Australian state election: Sussex
Party	Candidate	Votes	%	±%
Ministerialist	Henry Yelverton	249	43.6	+43.6
Ministerialist	Ernest Locke	200	35.0	–8.1
Opposition	Henry Mills	122	21.4	+21.4
Total formal votes		571	99.5	+3.2
Informal votes		3	0.5	–3.2
Turnout		574	63.4	–18.0
Ministerialist hold		Swing	N/A	

=== Elections in the 1890s ===
1897 Western Australian colonial election: Sussex
Party	Candidate	Votes	%	±%
Ministerialist	Ernest Locke	100	43.1	
Ministerialist	Frank Backhouse	71	30.6	
Ministerialist	Joseph Cookworthy	61	26.3	
Total formal votes		232	96.3	
Informal votes		9	3.7	
Turnout		241	81.4	
Ministerialist hold		Swing		

1894 Western Australian colonial election: Sussex
Party	Candidate	Votes	%	±%
None	Joseph Cookworthy	unopposed		

1890 Western Australian colonial election: Sussex
Party	Candidate	Votes	%	±%
None	Joseph Cookworthy	83	45.9	n/a
None	Maurice Davies	52	28.7	n/a
None	George Cross	46	25.4	n/a
