= Electoral results for the district of Vasse =

Western Australian district election results

This is a list of electoral results for the electoral district of Vasse in Western Australian state elections.

== Members for Vasse ==
Member	Party	Term
William Bovell	Liberal Country League	1950–1968
William Bovell	Liberal	1968–1971
Barry Blaikie	Liberal	1971–1996
Bernie Masters	Liberal	1996–2004
Bernie Masters	Independent	2004–2005
Troy Buswell	Liberal	2005–2014
Libby Mettam	Liberal	2014–present

== Election results ==
=== Elections in the 2020s ===
2025 Western Australian state election: Vasse
Party	Candidate	Votes	%	±%
Liberal	Libby Mettam	14,511	52.0	+7.5
Labor	Evan Lewis	6,499	23.3	−11.5
Greens	Mia Krasenstein	3,814	13.7	+4.2
One Nation	Steve Kefalinos	1,352	4.8	+3.8
Legalise Cannabis	Shelley Leech	1,097	3.9	+2.5
Christians	Stephen Cox	621	2.2	+2.2
Total formal votes		27,894	95.9	−0.6
Informal votes		1,190	4.1	+0.6
Turnout		29,084	87.3	+5.4
Two-party-preferred result
Liberal	Libby Mettam	17,688	63.4	+9.1
Labor	Evan Lewis	10,196	36.6	−9.1
Liberal hold		Swing	+9.1	

Results are not final. Last updated on 26 March 2025 at 5:30 PM AWST

2021 Western Australian state election: Vasse
Party	Candidate	Votes	%	±%
Liberal	Libby Mettam	11,697	44.1	−2.1
Labor	Chris Hossen	8,998	34.0	+13.3
Greens	Mia Krasenstein	2,765	10.4	−3.4
National	Peter Gordon	1,135	4.3	−15.0
Shooters, Fishers, Farmers	Cameron Van Veen	521	2.0	+2.0
No Mandatory Vaccination	A. W. Judd	489	1.8	+1.8
Legalise Cannabis	Neridah Rich	403	1.5	+1.5
One Nation	Jackson Wreford	253	1.0	+1.0
Sustainable Australia	Brad Satchell	191	0.7	+0.7
WAxit	Nicolas Oancea	46	0.2	+0.2
Total formal votes		26,498	96.5	+0.5
Informal votes		958	3.5	−0.5
Turnout		27,456	87.8	+2.8
Two-party-preferred result
Liberal	Libby Mettam	14,387	54.3	−10.3
Labor	Chris Hossen	12,107	45.7	+10.3
Liberal hold		Swing	−10.3	

=== Elections in the 2010s ===
2017 Western Australian state election: Vasse
Party	Candidate	Votes	%	±%
Liberal	Libby Mettam	11,032	46.2	−11.0
Labor	Wes Hartley	4,918	20.6	+8.3
National	Peter Gordon	4,606	19.3	+12.0
Greens	Luke O'Connell	3,297	13.8	+3.8
Total formal votes		23,853	96.0	+0.0
Informal votes		992	4.0	−0.0
Turnout		24,845	88.9	+4.1
Two-party-preferred result
Liberal	Libby Mettam	15,429	64.7	−6.5
Labor	Wes Hartley	8,421	35.3	+6.5
Liberal hold		Swing	−6.5	

2014 Vasse state by-election
Party	Candidate	Votes	%	±%
Liberal	Libby Mettam	8,805	44.3	−13.0
National	Peter Gordon	5,656	28.5	+21.2
Greens	Michael Baldock	3,567	18.0	+7.9
Independent	Peter Johnson	873	4.4	+4.4
Christians	Wayne Barnett	686	3.5	+3.5
Independent	Teresa van Lieshout	274	1.4	+1.4
Total formal votes		19,861	97.2	+1.2
Informal votes		569	2.8	–1.2
Turnout		20,430	82.6	−8.6
Two-candidate-preferred result
Liberal	Libby Mettam	10,520	53.0	−18.2
National	Peter Gordon	9,328	47.0	+47.0
Liberal hold		Swing	N/A	

2013 Western Australian state election: Vasse
Party	Candidate	Votes	%	±%
Liberal	Troy Buswell	11,593	57.3	–4.1
Labor	Lee Edmundson	2,501	12.4	–8.3
Greens	Michael Baldock	2,026	10.0	–5.6
Independent	Bernie Masters	1,624	8.0	+8.0
National	James Wishart	1,474	7.3	+7.3
Independent	Gary Norden	601	3.0	+3.0
Family First	Julie Westbrook	412	2.0	+2.0
Total formal votes		20,231	96.0	+0.5
Informal votes		848	4.0	−0.5
Turnout		21,079	91.2	
Two-party-preferred result
Liberal	Troy Buswell	14,396	71.2	+3.4
Labor	Lee Edmundson	5,822	28.8	–3.4
Liberal hold		Swing	+3.4	

=== Elections in the 2000s ===
2008 Western Australian state election: Vasse
Party	Candidate	Votes	%	±%
Liberal	Troy Buswell	11,306	55.5	+14.9
Labor	Marilyn Elson	4,427	21.8	−0.8
Greens	Mitchella Hutchins	3,653	17.9	+8.3
Christian Democrats	Gail Gifford	967	4.8	+3.6
Total formal votes		20,353	95.6	+0.1
Informal votes		947	4.4	−0.1
Turnout		21,300	87.8	
Two-party-preferred result
Liberal	Troy Buswell	12,913	63.5	+3.9
Labor	Marilyn Elson	7,423	36.5	−3.9
Liberal hold		Swing	+3.9	

2005 Western Australian state election: Vasse
Party	Candidate	Votes	%	±%
Liberal	Troy Buswell	4,611	37.6	+9.4
Labor	Ross Bromell	2,649	21.6	−3.6
Independent	Bernie Masters	2,526	20.6	+20.6
National	Beryle Morgan	1,207	9.8	−14.6
Greens	Jim Matan	681	5.6	−2.4
Family First	Paul Clayson	222	1.8	+1.8
Christian Democrats	Tracey Brough	162	1.3	+1.3
One Nation	Charles Doyle	147	1.2	−10.1
New Country	Ron Asher	61	0.5	+0.5
Total formal votes		12,266	95.4	−1.2
Informal votes		591	4.6	+1.2
Turnout		12,857	91.8	
Two-party-preferred result
Liberal	Troy Buswell	7,388	60.3	+6.2
Labor	Ross Bromell	4,871	39.7	−6.2
Two-candidate-preferred result
Liberal	Troy Buswell	6,228	50.9	−3.2
Independent	Bernie Masters	6,019	49.1	+49.1
Liberal hold		Swing	−3.2	

2001 Western Australian state election: Vasse
Party	Candidate	Votes	%	±%
Liberal	Bernie Masters	4,481	29.7	−13.5
Labor	Ross Bromell	3,619	24.0	+7.3
National	Beryle Morgan	3,481	23.1	−0.1
One Nation	Patricia Embry	1,856	12.3	+12.3
Greens	Bill Franssen	1,206	8.0	+8.0
Democrats	John Partridge	431	2.9	−0.7
Total formal votes		15,074	96.6	+0.2
Informal votes		535	3.4	−0.2
Turnout		15,609	92.4	
Two-party-preferred result
Liberal	Bernie Masters	8,302	55.5	−3.7
Labor	Ross Bromell	6,648	44.5	+44.5
Liberal hold		Swing	−14.2	

=== Elections in the 1990s ===
1996 Western Australian state election: Vasse
Party	Candidate	Votes	%	±%
Liberal	Bernie Masters	5,433	43.2	−14.9
National	Beryle Morgan	2,917	23.2	+14.0
Labor	Linda Mullins	2,097	16.7	−5.5
Independent	Mike Sully	1,261	10.0	+10.0
Democrats	Alf Denman	451	3.6	+2.9
Independent	Ron Palmer	413	3.3	+3.3
Total formal votes		12,572	96.4	−0.3
Informal votes		476	3.6	+0.3
Turnout		13,048	92.1	
Two-party-preferred result
Liberal	Bernie Masters	8,745	69.7	−0.6
Labor	Linda Mullins	3,802	30.3	+0.6
Two-candidate-preferred result
Liberal	Bernie Masters	7,424	59.2	−11.1
National	Beryle Morgan	5,116	40.8	+40.8
Liberal hold		Swing	−11.1	

1993 Western Australian state election: Vasse
Party	Candidate	Votes	%	±%
Liberal	Barry Blaikie	6,139	58.1	+1.2
Labor	Leslie Longwood	2,146	20.3	−7.8
Greens	David Swainston	1,203	11.4	+11.4
National	Coralie Tarbotton	1,076	10.2	−4.9
Total formal votes		10,564	96.8	+1.8
Informal votes		345	3.2	−1.8
Turnout		10,909	94.7	+1.1
Two-party-preferred result
Liberal	Barry Blaikie	7,524	71.2	+2.5
Labor	Leslie Longwood	3,040	28.8	−2.5
Liberal hold		Swing	+2.5	

=== Elections in the 1980s ===
1989 Western Australian state election: Vasse
Party	Candidate	Votes	%	±%
Liberal	Barry Blaikie	5,205	56.9	−5.4
Labor	Leslie Longwood	2,568	28.1	−9.6
National	Alan Hillier	1,380	15.1	+15.1
Total formal votes		9,153	95.0	
Informal votes		486	5.0	
Turnout		9,639	93.6	
Two-party-preferred result
Liberal	Barry Blaikie	6,292	68.7	+6.4
Labor	Leslie Longwood	2,861	31.3	−6.4
Liberal hold		Swing	+6.4	

1986 Western Australian state election: Vasse
Party	Candidate	Votes	%	±%
Liberal	Barry Blaikie	6,359	63.5	+4.0
Labor	Laurie Watson	3,648	36.5	+5.4
Total formal votes		10,007	98.1	+0.3
Informal votes		195	1.9	−0.3
Turnout		10,202	94.3	+1.9
Liberal hold		Swing	−0.7	

1983 Western Australian state election: Vasse
Party	Candidate	Votes	%	±%
Liberal	Barry Blaikie	4,947	59.5	
Labor	Dane Carroll	2,586	31.1	
Independent	Stewart Melville	783	9.4	
Total formal votes		8,316	97.8	
Informal votes		187	2.2	
Turnout		8,503	92.4	
Two-party-preferred result
Liberal	Barry Blaikie	5,339	64.2	
Labor	Dane Carroll	2,977	35.8	
Liberal hold		Swing		

1980 Western Australian state election: Vasse
Party	Candidate	Votes	%	±%
Liberal	Barry Blaikie	6,147	68.2	+0.9
Labor	Barbara Taylor	2,236	24.8	+0.8
Independent	Alfred Bussell	623	6.9	+6.9
Total formal votes		9,006	97.8	−0.1
Informal votes		201	2.2	+0.1
Turnout		9,207	92.3	−2.7
Two-party-preferred result
Liberal	Barry Blaikie	6,454	71.7	+0.1
Labor	Barbara Taylor	2,552	28.3	−0.1
Liberal hold		Swing	+0.1	

=== Elections in the 1970s ===
1977 Western Australian state election: Vasse
Party	Candidate	Votes	%	±%
Liberal	Barry Blaikie	5,493	67.3	
Labor	Peter Naughton	1,961	24.0	
Independent	Alister Walker	707	8.7	
Total formal votes		8,161	97.9	
Informal votes		172	2.1	
Turnout		8,333	95.0	
Two-party-preferred result
Liberal	Barry Blaikie	5,847	71.6	
Labor	Peter Naughton	2,314	28.4	
Liberal hold		Swing		

1974 Western Australian state election: Vasse
Party	Candidate	Votes	%	±%
Liberal	Barry Blaikie	4,548	60.0	
Labor	Robert Goddard	2,015	26.6	
National Alliance	Ronald Loughton	1,014	13.4	
Total formal votes		7,577	96.7	
Informal votes		256	3.3	
Turnout		7,833	93.8	
Two-party-preferred result
Liberal	Barry Blaikie	5,410	71.4	
Labor	Robert Goddard	2,167	28.6	
Liberal hold		Swing		

1971 Western Australian state election: Vasse
Party	Candidate	Votes	%	±%
Labor	Alexander Hemsley	2,299	37.3	+37.3
Liberal	Barry Blaikie	1,977	32.1	−67.9
Country	Colin Fyfe	1,121	18.2	+18.2
Independent	Edward Packard	457	7.4	+7.4
Democratic Labor	John Brennan	306	5.0	+5.0
Total formal votes		6,160	97.9	
Informal votes		130	2.1	
Turnout		6,290	94.4	
Two-party-preferred result
Liberal	Barry Blaikie	3,231	52.4	−47.6
Labor	Alexander Hemsley	2,929	47.6	+47.6
Liberal hold		Swing	N/A	

=== Elections in the 1960s ===
1968 Western Australian state election: Vasse
Party	Candidate	Votes	%	±%
Liberal and Country	William Bovell	unopposed		
Liberal and Country hold		Swing		

1965 Western Australian state election: Vasse
Party	Candidate	Votes	%	±%
Liberal and Country	William Bovell	3,588	70.4	−29.6
Labor	Colin Smith	1,515	29.6	+29.6
Total formal votes		5,093	98.7	
Informal votes		65	1.3	
Turnout		5,158	95.4	
Liberal and Country hold		Swing	N/A	

1962 Western Australian state election: Vasse
Party	Candidate	Votes	%	±%
Liberal and Country	William Bovell	unopposed		
Liberal and Country hold		Swing		

=== Elections in the 1950s ===
1959 Western Australian state election: Vasse
Party	Candidate	Votes	%	±%
Liberal and Country	William Bovell	3,984	78.1	−21.9
Democratic Labor	George Shervington	1,119	21.9	+21.9
Total formal votes		5,103	97.4	
Informal votes		134	2.6	
Turnout		5,237	94.2	
Liberal and Country hold		Swing	N/A	

1956 Western Australian state election: Vasse
Party	Candidate	Votes	%	±%
Liberal and Country	William Bovell	unopposed		
Liberal and Country hold		Swing		

1953 Western Australian state election: Vasse
Party	Candidate	Votes	%	±%
Liberal and Country	William Bovell	unopposed		
Liberal and Country hold		Swing		

1950 Western Australian state election: Vasse
Party	Candidate	Votes	%	±%
Liberal and Country	William Bovell	2,996	64.8	
Country	Robert Leiper	1,625	35.2	
Total formal votes		4,621	98.0	
Informal votes		94	2.0	
Turnout		4,715	94.0	
Liberal and Country hold		Swing		
