= List of mayors of Busselton =

The CIty of Busselton is a local government area in the south west of Western Australia.

The Municipality of Busselton was established on 21 February 1871, and ceased to exist in May 1951 when it amalgamated with the Sussex Road District to form the Busselton Road District.

The Busselton Road District was declared a Shire in 1961.

In 2012, the Shire of Busselton became the City of Busselton.

== Municipality of Busselton ==
Mayor	Term	Reference
George William Barnard	1907–1909; 1915–1917	
George Cross		

== Busselton Road Board ==
Mayor	Term	Reference
F.H. Jolliffe	1951	
R. Falkingham	1951–1952	
B.K. Killerby	1952–1954	
J.M. Butcher	1954–1959	
F.H. Jolliffe	1959–1961	

== Shire President of Busselton ==
Shire President	Term	Reference
F.H. Jolliffe	1961–1964	
L.N. Weston	1964–1965	
F.H. Jolliffe	1965–1969	
M.A. Rose	1969–1970	
A.F. Patterson	1970–1973	
J. Torrent	1973–1979	
J.M. Sheedy	1979–1985	
T.B. House	1985–1986	
C.A. Guthrie	1986–1987	
E.J. Smith	1987–1990	
R.J. Cooper	1990–1993	
R. Tognela	1993–1994	
M.C. Sully	1994–1996	
B. Morgan	1996–2003	
Troy R. Buswell	2003–2005	
C.F. Elliot	2005–2005	
K. Douglas	2005–2007	
B.J. Clarke	2007–2007	
W.H. Hartley	2007–2009	
Ian W. Stubbs	2009–2012	

== City of Busselton ==
Mayor	Term	Reference
Ian Stubbs	2012–2015	
Grant Henley	2015–2023	
Phill Cronin	25 October 2023 (term to 2027)	
