= Yelverton =

Yelverton may refer to:

== Places ==
- Yelverton, Devon, England
- Yelverton, Norfolk, England
- Yelverton, Ohio, a community in the United States
- Yelverton, Ontario, Canada
- Yelverton, Western Australia, Australia
- Yelverton Inn and Store, Chester, New York State
- Yelverton Lodge, London, England
- Yelverton Pass, a pass on Ellesmere Island, Nunavut, Canada
- Anthony Yelverton House, Highland, New York State
- Yelverton, Marlborough in the Marlborough District of the South Island of New Zealand

== People ==
- Anne Yelverton (1628–1698), Countess of Manchester and Countess of Halifax
- Barbara Yelverton, later Barbara Rawdon-Hastings, Marchioness of Hastings (1810–1858), English fossil collector and geologist
- Charlie Yelverton (born 1948), American professional basketball player
- Christopher Yelverton (1536–1612), English Speaker of the House of Commons
- Sir Christopher Yelverton, 1st Baronet (1602–1654), English politician
- Hastings Yelverton (1808–1877), British Royal Navy officer and politician
- Henry Yelverton (attorney general) (1566–1630), English lawyer, politician, and judge
- Henry Yelverton (Australian politician) (1854–1906), Western Australian Legislative Council, 1901–1904
- Henry Yelverton (merchant), Australian timber merchant
- Henry Yelverton, 19th Baron Grey de Ruthyn (1780–1810), British peer, friend of Lord Byron
- James W. Yelverton (1869–1950), New York politician
- Theresa Yelverton (1830s–1881), English woman involved in the Yelverton case
- William Yelverton (1400–1470s), judge in Norfolk and MP for Great Yarmouth 1435–1436

== Other ==
- Yelverton case, a nineteenth-century Irish law case
- Yelverton baronets, both in the Baronetage of England

== See also ==
- Viscount Avonmore, a title held by the Yelverton family
- Henry Yelverton (disambiguation)
