= Grove Manor =

Manor house on the Isle of Wight in England

Grove Manor is a manor house in the parish of Brading on the Isle of Wight in England.

== History ==
Grove doubtless originally formed part of the Adgestone Manor holding, from which it became separated in the 16th century, and may be identical with the land in Adgestone held of the manor of Alverstone by Thomas Fitchett in 1510. The first owners seem to have been the Fitchetts, an early Isle of Wight family, whom Sir John Oglander speaks of as having been seated there for many generations, and who certainly held Grove in the 16th and 17th centuries. John Fitchett of Grove died in 1738 and his widow Elizabeth in 1742. n the 19th century Grove was held by the Jacobs family, who in 1846 sold it to Mr. Thomas Hillier, whose daughter had married a Jacobs, and to whom it passed on the death of her father. As of 1912 it was owned by the trustees of Muggeridge. The old house, an 18th-century structure, was pulled down in 1890, and the present new one built.
