= Henry Yelverton =

Henry Yelverton may refer to:

- Henry Yelverton, 19th Baron Grey de Ruthyn (1780–1810), British peer
- Henry Yelverton (merchant) (1821–1880), Australian timber merchant
- Sir Henry Yelverton, 2nd Baronet (1633–1670), English politician
- Henry Yelverton (Australian politician) (1854–1906), Member of the Western Australian Legislative Council from 1901 to 1904
- Henry Yelverton (attorney-general) (1566–1629), English attorney-general
- Henry Yelverton, 3rd Earl of Sussex, Earl of Sussex
- Henry Yelverton, 1st Viscount Longueville, Viscount Longueville

== See also ==
- Yelverton (disambiguation)
