= 2014 Vasse state by-election =

Western Australian state by-election

- 18 October 2014
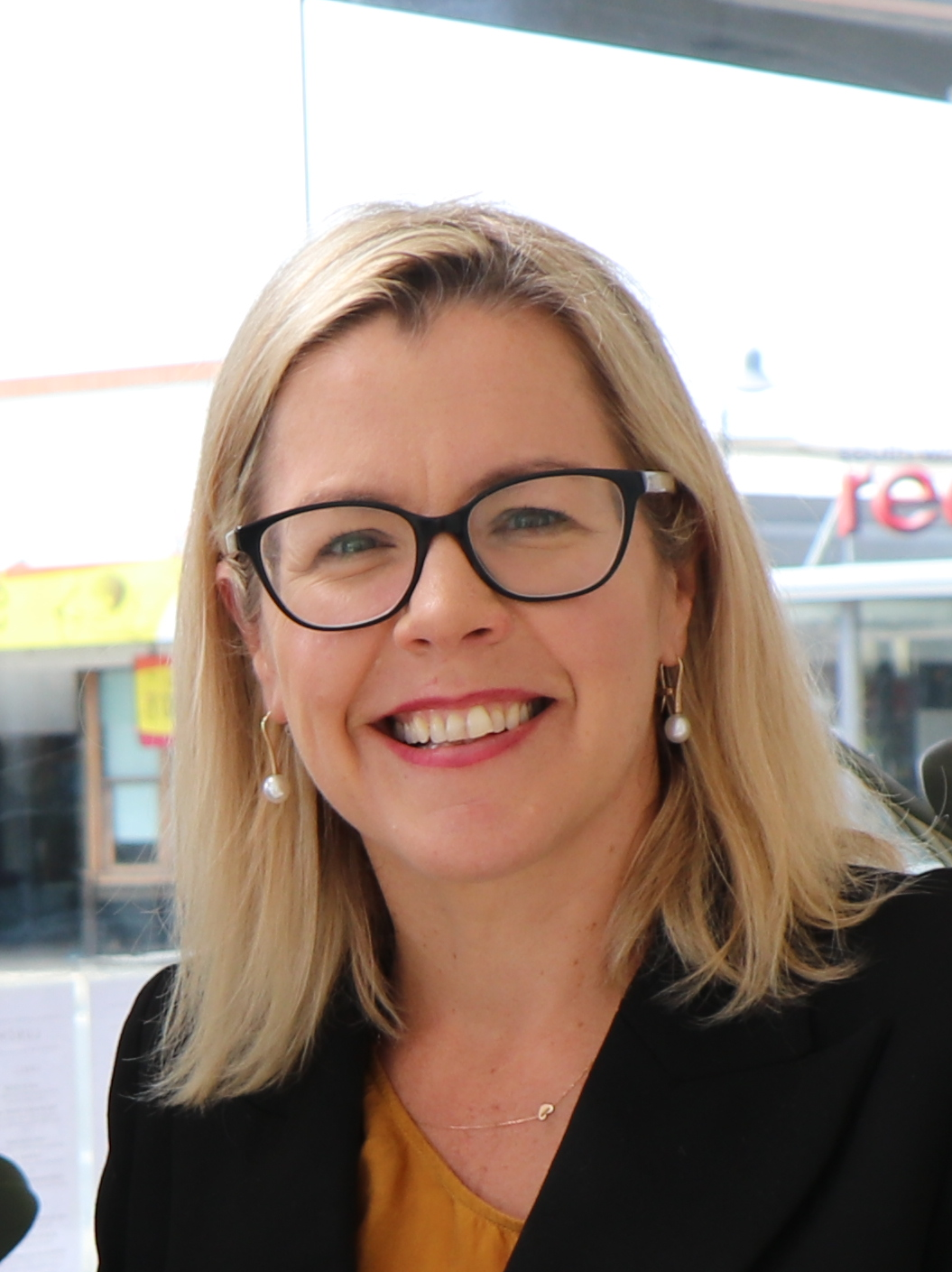

	First party	Second party	Third party
Candidate	Libby Mettam	Peter Gordon	Michael Baldock
Party	Liberal	National	Greens
Primary vote	8,805	5,656	3,567
Percentage	44.3%	28.5%	18.0%
Swing	▼13.0	▲21.2	▲7.9
TPP	53.0%	47.0%
TPP swing	▼18.2	▲47.0
MP before election
Troy Buswell
Liberal
Elected MP
Libby Mettam
Liberal

A by-election for the seat of Vasse in the Western Australian Legislative Assembly was held on 18 October 2014. The by-election was triggered by the resignation of Liberal MLA and former Liberal leader Troy Buswell on 3 September 2014, who won the seat at the 2013 election with a 57.3 percent primary and a 71.2 percent two-party vote. It was held on the same day as the 2014 Casuarina by-election in the Northern Territory.

== Candidates ==
The writ for the by-election was issued on 18 September 2014, and candidate nominations were open until 26 September.

The six candidates in ballot paper order were as follows:

Candidate nominations
Party	Candidate	Background
Christians	Wayne Barnett	Horticulture manager. Resident of Busselton, contested Collie-Preston for the Christian Democrats at the 2008 state election and Forrest for the Australian Christians at the 2013 federal election.
Nationals	Peter Gordon	Businessman. Resident of Busselton.
Independent	Peter Johnson	Life member and former state president of the Rebels Motorcycle Club.
Liberal	Libby Mettam	Former journalist and current media adviser for Barry House, MLC. Resident of Dunsborough.
Greens	Michael Baldock	Structural engineer. Resident of Busselton, contested Vasse for the Greens at the 2013 state election.
Independent	Teresa van Lieshout	Perennial candidate.

The Labor Party declined to field a candidate at the by-election.

== Results ==
Vasse state by-election, 2014
Party	Candidate	Votes	%	±%
Liberal	Libby Mettam	8,805	44.3	−13.0
National	Peter Gordon	5,656	28.5	+21.2
Greens	Michael Baldock	3,567	18.0	+7.9
Independent	Peter Johnson	873	4.4	+4.4
Christians	Wayne Barnett	686	3.5	+3.5
Independent	Teresa van Lieshout	274	1.4	+1.4
Total formal votes		19,861	97.2	+1.2
Informal votes		569	2.8	–1.2
Turnout		20,430	82.6	−8.6
Two-candidate-preferred result
Liberal	Libby Mettam	10,520	53.0	−18.2
National	Peter Gordon	9,328	47.0	+47.0
Liberal hold		Swing	N/A	

== See also ==
- Electoral results for the district of Vasse
- List of Western Australian state by-elections
