= Frank Wilson (politician) =

Premier of Western Australia (1859 – 1918)

The Honourable Frank Wilson CMG
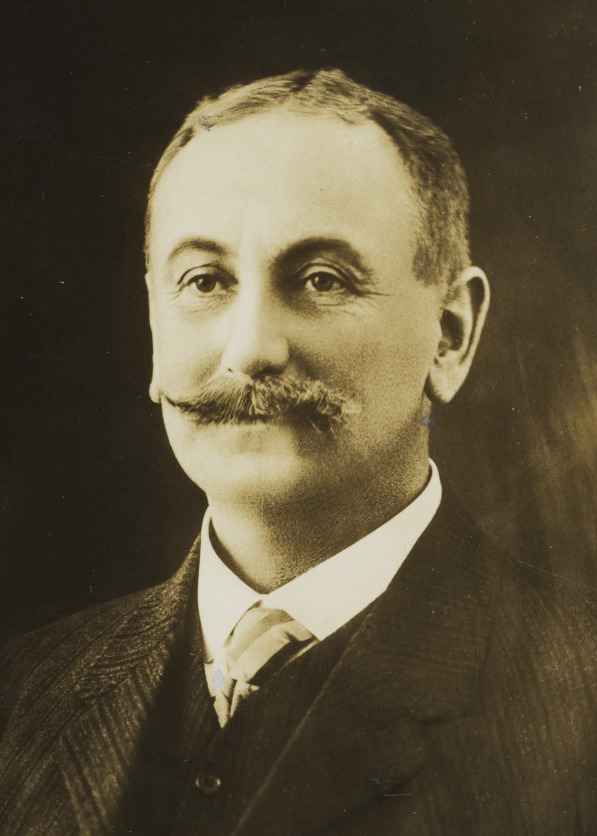
- Wilson c. 1911

9th Premier of Western Australia
- In office 16 September 1910 – 7 October 1911
- Monarch: George V
- Governor: Sir Gerald Strickland
- Preceded by: Newton Moore
- Succeeded by: John Scaddan
- In office 27 July 1916 – 28 June 1917
- Monarch: George V
- Governor: Sir Harry Barron; Sir William Ellison-Macartney
- Preceded by: John Scaddan
- Succeeded by: Henry Lefroy

Member of the Legislative Assembly of Western Australia
- In office 6 May 1897 – 24 April 1901
- Preceded by: None (new seat)
- Succeeded by: None (abolished)
- Constituency: Canning
- In office 24 April – 6 December 1901
- Preceded by: Lyall Hall
- Succeeded by: William Purkiss
- Constituency: Perth
- In office 28 June 1904 – 29 September 1917
- Preceded by: Henry Yelverton
- Succeeded by: William Pickering
- Constituency: Sussex

Personal details
- Born: 12 May 1859 Monkwearmouth, County Durham, England
- Died: 7 December 1918 (aged 59) Claremont, Western Australia, Australia

Frank Wilson CMG (12 May 1859 – 7 December 1918), was the ninth Premier of Western Australia, serving on two separate occasions – from 1910 to 1911 and then again from 1916 to 1917.

== Early life ==
Wilson was born at Monkwearmouth, Sunderland, England on 12 May 1859. He was educated in Sunderland, then Moravian School in Neuwied, Germany, and finally at Wesley College, Sheffield. He was then apprenticed to Peacock Bros. and Sons, a Sunderland firm of shipbrokers and timber merchants. At the age of nineteen, he joined his brother in the establishment of an engineering works. Two years later, he married Annie Phillips.

Wilson remained in the engineering business for eight years, until an engineering strike in 1886 caused the business substantial losses. The following year he sailed for Queensland, where he initially ran his own business, and later became manager of A. Overend and Company, a well-known firm of railway contractors, machinery merchants and flour millers. In October 1891, Wilson came to Perth, Western Australia to take up an appointment as managing director of the Canning Jarrah Timber Company, a position that he held until 1899. He became director of numerous other companies, and acted as a mining agent. For many years he was president of the Timber merchants and Saw Millers' Association, and from 1899 until 1902 he was president of the Perth Chamber of Commerce.

== Politics ==
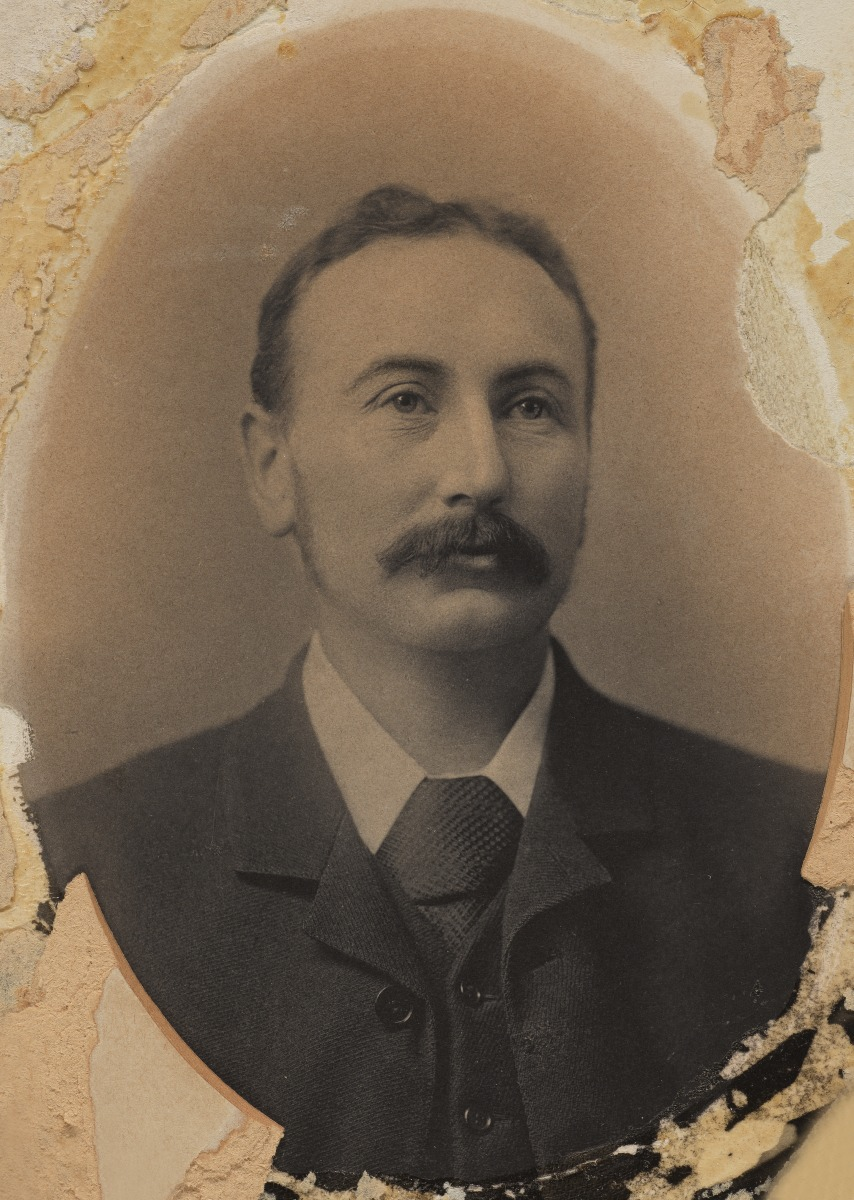
Wilson in 1897

In 1895, Wilson was elected to East Ward on the Perth City Council, and two years later was elected to the Western Australian Legislative Assembly seat of Canning, where he sat in opposition to Premier John Forrest. In the general election of 1901, Wilson successfully contested the seat of Perth, his Canning seat having been abolished under the Constitution Acts Amendment Act 1899. On 21 November 1901, he was appointed Commissioner for Railways and Minister for Railways and Mines in Alf Morgans' government, but lost his seat to William Purkiss in the subsequent ministerial by-election. After unsuccessfully contesting the Claremont by-election on 11 June 1902, he was elected to the seat of Sussex at the 1904 state election, which he then held for over thirteen years.

Wilson was Minister for Works for the duration of Cornthwaite Rason's government, from August 1905 until May 1906. He might then have become premier but stood aside in favour of Newton Moore. In Moore's ministry Wilson was initially appointed Colonial Treasurer, Minister for Agriculture and Minister for Education. By June 1909 he had relinquished these portfolios, and he was then appointed Minister for Works. For part of 1910, he was acting premier while Moore was absent in England.

=== Premierships ===
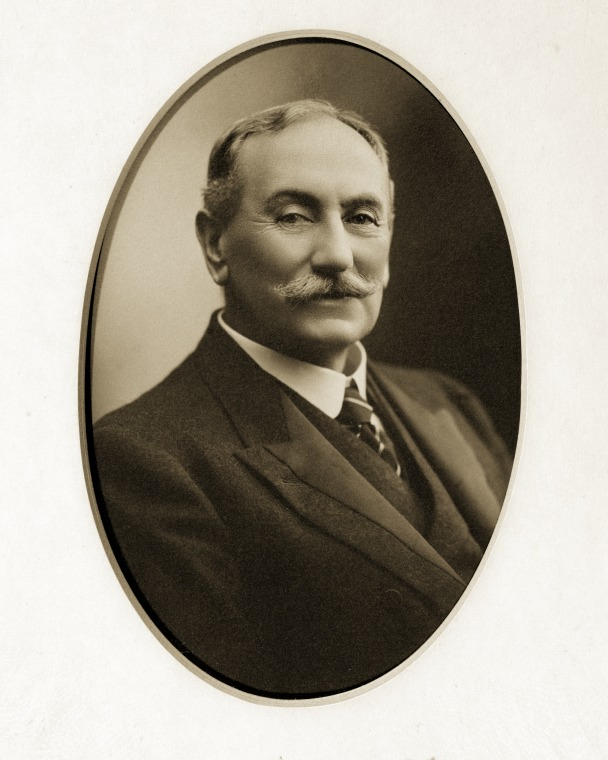
Wilson c. 1918

On 16 September 1910, Moore resigned the premiership on the grounds of ill health, and Wilson became Premier and Colonial Treasurer. His government was responsible for the legislation that established the University of Western Australia, and also initiated the Redistribution of Seats Bill 1911. In June 1911, Wilson was made CMG.

Wilson held the office of premier until the general election of 7 October 1911, when his government was heavily defeated by the Labour party. He then became Leader of the Opposition until July 1916. During this time, he was chosen as a foundation member of the Senate of the University of Western Australia, and would remain a member until December 1915. He also represented Western Australia at the coronation of King George V in June 1911.

Labour was returned in the election of 1914, but its majority was reduced to a margin of two seats. Over the next two years, two Labour members resigned. Labour lost both by-elections, so that by November 1916, the government had only 24 seats in a house of fifty. On 27 July 1916, the Liberal and Country parties cooperated to defeat the government in the Legislative Assembly. After being refused a dissolution of Parliament by the governor, the premier John Scaddan resigned, and Wilson became premier for the second time.

Although the Country Party cooperated with the Liberals in bringing down Scaddan's Labour government, they declined to form a coalition ministry, and they were inconsistent in their support of Wilson's government. At one point in February 1917, a dispute between the parties prompted Wilson to tender his resignation, but this was refused by the governor. At the same time, federal party politics was being transformed by the "nationalist movement", a reconstruction of the party system along the lines of the conscription debate. There was some pressure on Wilson to form a Nationalist Party at the state level, and this pressure increased after Billy Hughes' Nationalist Party easily won the federal election of May 1917. Later that month, Wilson called a meeting of Liberal, Country Party and National Labor members, and a Nationalist Party was formed. However, in early June the members of the new party voted to reconstruct the ministry by caucus election. Realising that the intention was to oust the current ministry, Wilson and three of his ministers walked out of the meeting. Two weeks later, Henry Lefroy was elected leader of the party, leaving Wilson with no choice but to resign as premier. He did so on 28 June 1917, and sat as an independent until the general elections of 29 September 1917, in which he lost his seat by a margin of four votes.

== Personal life ==
Wilson married and he and Annie had nine children. The penultitimate child known as Linley Wilson was a notable dancing teacher.

Wilson's health had been poor for some time, and shortly after the election he became seriously ill, and underwent surgery. He died at Claremont, Western Australia on 7 December 1918, and was buried at Karrakatta Cemetery.

== General references ==
- Black, David; Bolton, Geoffrey (2001a). Biographical Register of Members of the Parliament of Western Australia. Vol. One: 1870–1930 (Revised ed.). Parliament House: Parliament of Western Australia. ISBN 0730738140.
- Reid, Gordon Stanley; Oliver, Margaret Ruth (1982). The Premiers of Western Australia 1890–1982. Nedlands, Western Australia: University of Western Australia Press. ISBN 0-85564-214-9.
- Black, David (1 December 1981). "Party Politics in Turmoil". In C. T. Stannage (ed.). A New History of Western Australia. Nedlands: UWA Publishing. ISBN 0-85564-181-9. LCCN 82101009. OCLC 963830667. OL 3517729M. Wikidata Q125995168.
- The Constitution Centre of Western Australia (2002). Governors and Premiers of Western Australia. West Perth, Western Australia: The Constitution Centre of Western Australia. ISBN 0-7307-3821-3.
- Kimberly, W.B. (compiler) (1897). History of West Australia. A Narrative of her Past. Together With Biographies of Her Leading Men. Melbourne: F.W. Niven.

Political offices
Preceded by Newton Moore	Premier of Western Australia; 1910–1911	Succeeded by John Scaddan
Preceded by John Scaddan	Premier of Western Australia; 1916–1917	Succeeded by Henry Lefroy
