= Sussex Road District =

Former local government area in South West Western Australia

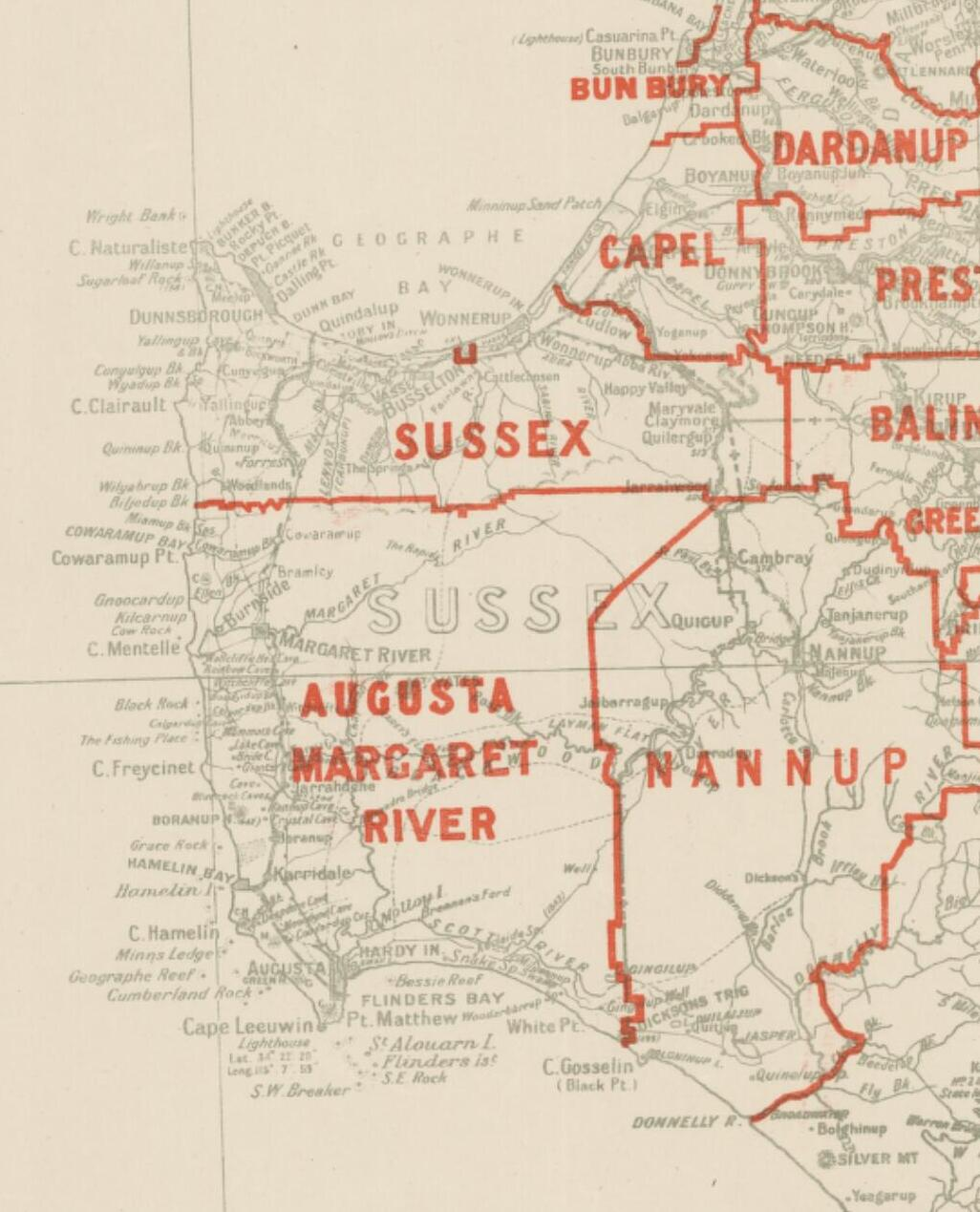
Sussex and surrounding road districts, 1935

The Sussex Road District was an early local government area in the Busselton region of Western Australia.

It was established on 24 January 1871, adopting the historic name of the Busselton region, in honour of Prince Augustus Frederick, Duke of Sussex. Its original boundaries included the town of Busselton and extended as far as Augusta, Dunsborough, Forest Grove, Jarrahwood and Margaret River. However, a month later, on 21 February 1871, the Municipality of Busselton was proclaimed, separating the town of Busselton from the road district which surrounded it, with the boundary being West Street and Ford Road. The first election for the Sussex Road Board was held on 25 February 1871.

The district became smaller by the turn of the century due to rural parts of the district gaining their own local government. A section of the district separated with the formation of the Lower Blackwood Road District on 20 February 1890 and the Augusta-Margaret River area separated on 16 April 1891 with the proclamation of the Augusta Road District.

The district was divided into wards on 12 June 1914, with the west ward electing two members, the central ward electing three members, and the east ward electing two members. The West Busselton area was separated from Central Ward to form West Busselton Ward on 9 April 1937, electing two members, with Central Ward continuing to elect three.

The road board was based in Busselton, with the board's office from 1936 until its abolition in 1951 being located on the corner of Bussell Highway and High Street in West Busselton (later the Busselton Youth and Community Centre). It had previously been based out of a room in the Busselton municipal chambers building.

The division of Busselton township into two local governments became a concern with the growth of West Busselton (located within the road district) and its declaration as a townsite in 1938. The Busselton and District Chamber of Commerce was advocating for the extension of the municipal boundaries from 1945, with the amalgamation of the two bodies flagged as a possible alternative.

The Sussex Road District amalgamated with the Municipality of Busselton on 11 May 1951 to form the Busselton Road District (now the City of Busselton).

Joseph Cookworthy was a member of the road board before entering state politics.
