= Busselton Margaret River Airport =

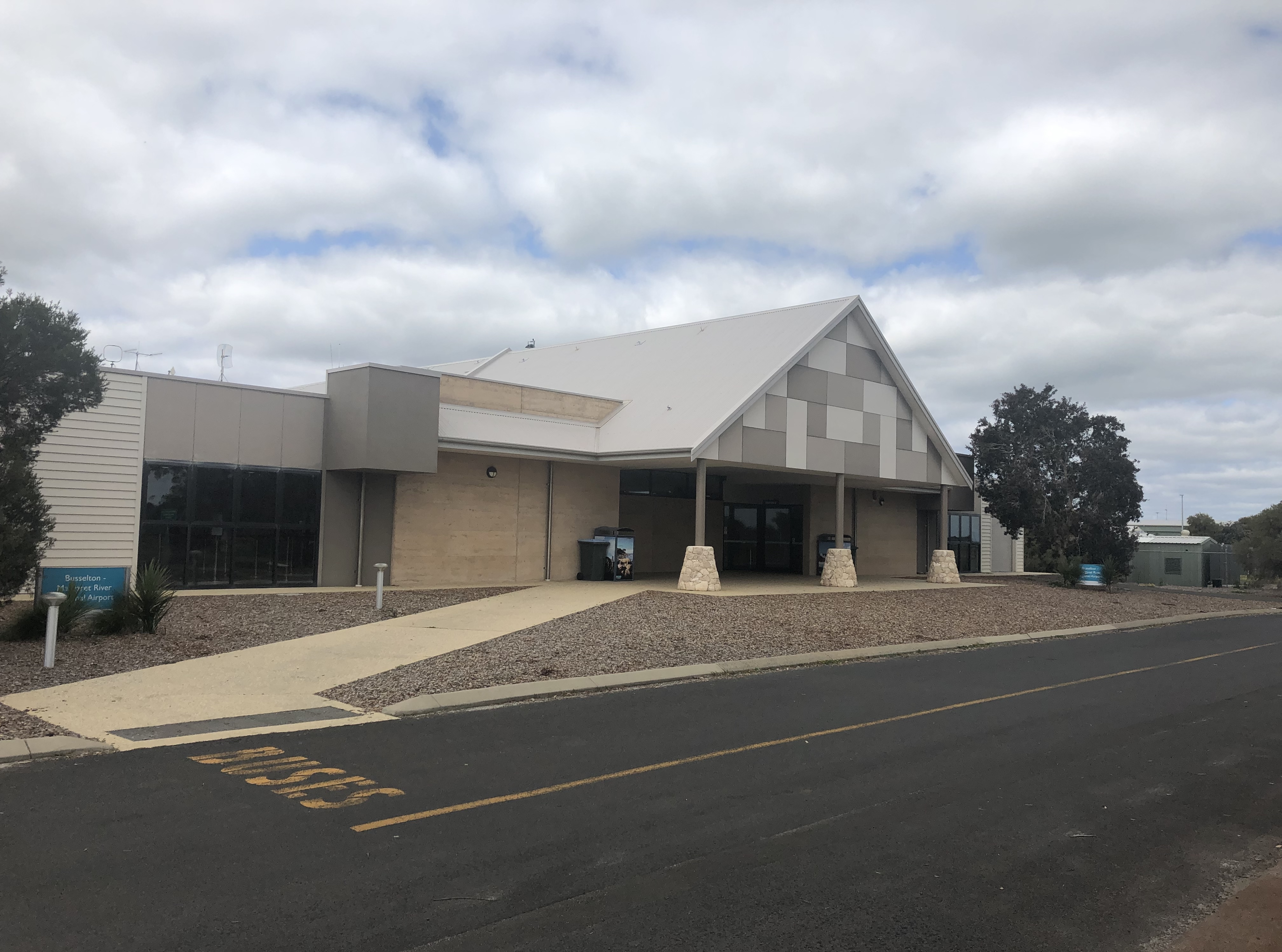
- Airport terminal building in October 2019
- IATA: BQB; ICAO: YBLN

Summary
- Airport type: Public
- Owner: City of Busselton
- Serves: Busselton
- Location: Yalyalup, Western Australia
- Opened: 15 March 1997
- Elevation AMSL: 55 ft (17 m)
- Coordinates: 33°41′14″S 115°24′01″E
- Website: www.busseltonmargaretriverairport.com.au

Map
- Location in Western Australia

Runways
Direction	Length		Surface
Direction	m	ft	Surface
03/21	2,460	8,071	Asphalt
- Sources: Australian AIP and aerodrome chart

Busselton Margaret River Airport (IATA: BQB, ICAO: YBLN), formerly known as Busselton Regional Airport, is located in the Busselton suburb of Yalyalup, 6.5 kilometres (4.0 mi) from the town centre. Busselton is a major regional centre in the South West region of Western Australia, 220 kilometres (140 mi) south of Perth and at the edge of the Margaret River wine region.

== History ==
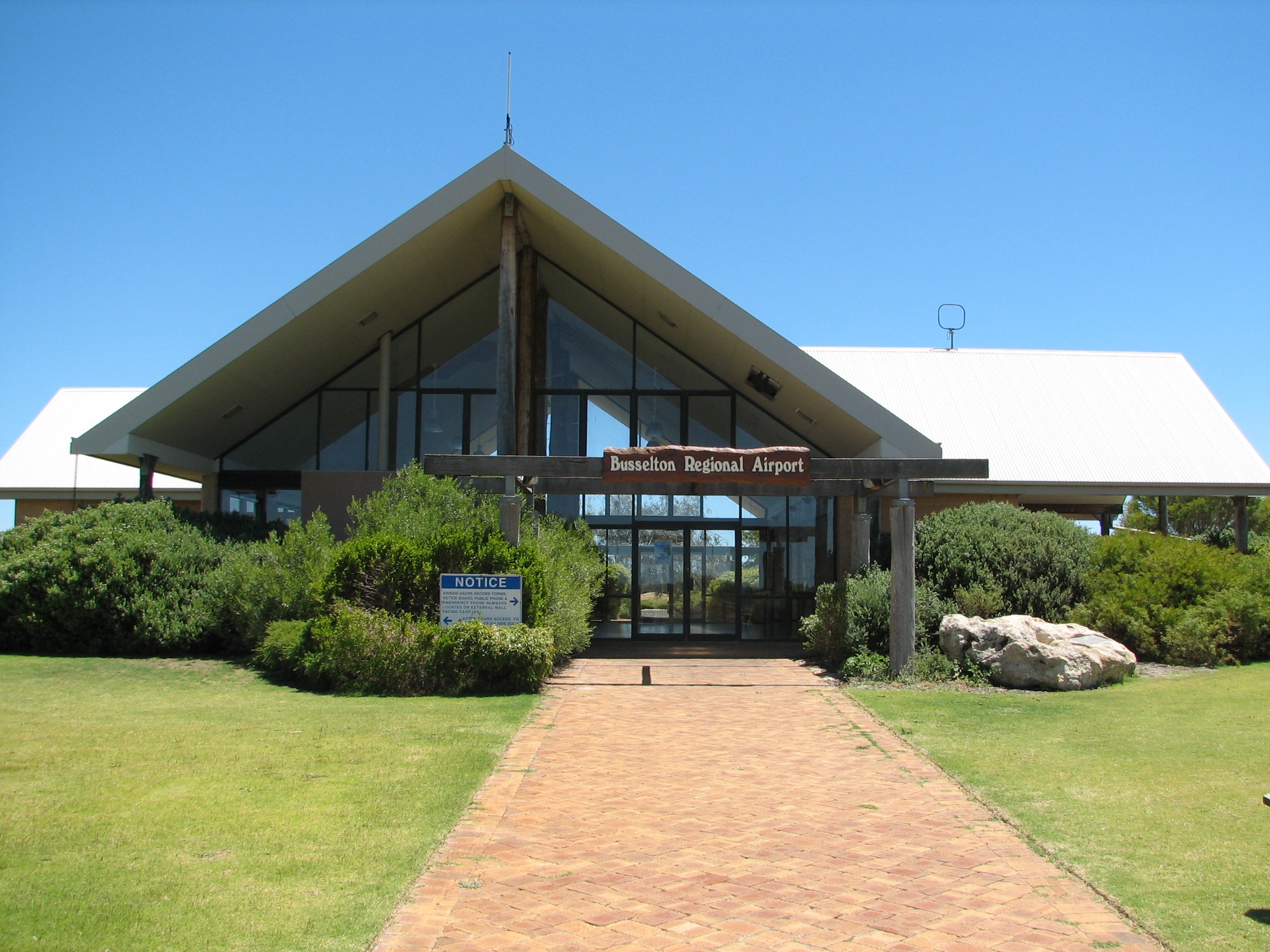
Airport terminal building in February 2006

Busselton Regional Airport was opened on 15 March 1997 by Premier of Western Australia Richard Court replacing Busselton Aerodrome, established in 1940, that was used extensively during World War II. A Government of Western Australia subsidised service operated from Perth to Busselton from 1997 to 2001 (via Margaret River Airport from 1999). It was operated by Skywest Airlines (now Virgin Australia Regional Airlines), Maroomba Airlines and Skippers Aviation.

In 2007, Rio Tinto launched its first flight from the airport for fly-in fly-out workers at its mines. Skywest Airlines/Virgin Australia Regional Airlines operated a service from Perth to Albany via Busselton from July 2011 until December 2014, before scaling it back to operate between Perth and Busselton before cancelling it altogether in April 2015.

Between June and December 2014, upgrades to the terminal were made. In June 2015, funding was allocated for further upgrades and redevelopment of the airport. As part of the funding agreement, Margaret River was officially added to the title of the airport in October 2015. In 2017, a A$69.7-million redevelopment of the airport commenced which included:

- Lengthening, widening and strengthening of the existing runway to facilitate Code E aircraft
- A new four-bay Code E aircraft parking apron and connecting taxiways
- A new passenger terminal
- A new general aviation precinct
- Upgrades to the existing Code C apron
- New aeronautical ground lighting
- New parking facilities
- Upgrades to the internal road network
- Infrastructure to support the development of freight and commercial opportunities

As part of the development, a new terminal building was proposed to be built in front of the new Code E Apron to help facilitate future interstate and international services. In early 2018, the Government of Western Australia placed the construction of the new terminal building on hold until a major commercial airline committed to interstate services that were shown to be viable.

In September 2019, it was announced that Jetstar was to launch a subsidised service to Melbourne in April 2020. As a result of the service confirmation, the Government of Western Australia announced it would spend an extra A$3.2 million upgrading the airport's terminal. The commencement of the service was postponed eight times due to the COVID-19 pandemic. Flights began as part of a three-year trial of the route on 6 April 2022. The terminal upgrade was also postponed until after the three-year trial period.

In April 2019, the airport was designated as an international alternate airport to Perth; previously the closest airports with this designation were Learmonth and Adelaide.

In 2023, there were renewed calls to upgrade the terminal before the conclusion of the three-year trial period after the success of the new service and increases in mining flights, with annual passenger numbers jumping from 25,000 before the COVID-19 pandemic to 95,000 by 2023. In March 2024 Jetstar commenced flights to Sydney after the success of the Melbourne service. In June 2024, a new Royal Flying Doctor Service facility opened. QantasLink attempted to launch another Perth–Busselton commercial service on 27 June 2025, but it was cancelled three months later and its final flight was on 6 October; however, the airline still offers charter flights on the route. On 14 April 2026, Jetstar announced that it would suspend its Sydney service until 22 September because of rising fuel costs due to the 2026 Iran war and insufficient passenger demand.

Busselton is home to the largest fly-in fly-out workforce in Western Australia outside Perth, resulting in the airport seeing numerous mining charters for BHP, Fortescue and Rio Tinto each week.

== Airlines and destinations ==
Airlines	Destinations
Alliance Airlines	Charter: Coondewanna, Newman, Perth
Jetstar	Melbourne, Sydney
QantasLink	Charter: Christmas Creek, Solomon, Perth
Skippers Aviation	Charter: Perth, Thunderbox Gold Mine
Virgin Australia Regional Airlines	Charter: Barimunya, Boolgeeda, Geraldton, Perth, West Angelas

== Facilities ==
Busselton Margaret River Airport has a single 2,460-metre-long (8,070 ft) and 45-metre-wide (148 ft) runway (03/21) and is rated at Code E with capability to handle aircraft the size and weight of an Airbus A330.

Precision Approach Path Indicator is available for both ends and low-intensity runway lights can be activated by radio (Pilot Controlled Lighting). Two illuminated windsocks are on site.

Non-precision instrument approaches include GNSS (GPS) approaches to both runways, and a sole NDB (automatic direction finder) approach to runway 21.

== See also ==
- List of airports in Western Australia
- Aviation transport in Australia
