= Adgestone Manor =

- Former names: Abedestone
- Alternative names: Avicestone

General information
- Location: Brading, England
- Owner: Edward Granville Ward

Adgestone Manor (also Abedestone, Avicestone, 11th century; Auythestone, 13th century; Aucheston, 15th century; Aidotone, 16th century; Ageston, 16th century; Adgestone, 18th century) is a manor house in Brading on the Isle of Wight.

== History ==
Adgestone was held of the Confessor by three freemen as a free manor, and at the time of Domesday was in the hands of the king. Two other holdings called Avicestone, held in 1086 by William son of Azor and by Edric the king's thegn, may be identified with Adgestone. At the end of the 13th century John de Weston held half a fee of John de Insula (Lisle) in Milton and Adgestone, and the lord of Whitefield held a fortieth of a fee in Adgestone of the honour of Carisbrooke Castle. (The latter holding belonged in 1299 to John de Witvil or Wyvill, and passed afterwards to Edward de Whitefield, and from him to William de Whitefield. Anna Witvil or Wyvill held land at Adgestone in 1384–5. The former followed the same descent as Milton (q.v.) until 1431, when it was held by John Haket and John Roucle or Rookley. After this date it seems to have passed with Brook to the Bowermans, as Joan Bowerman and her grandson Nicholas both died seized of land in Adgestone, which they held of the manor of Alverstone. In the rental of Alverstone Manor, 8 October 1510, land in Adgestone was held by Thomas Fitchett, who did homage at Alverstone. This suggests that part of Adgestone, probably the western portion, had been absorbed by Alverstone. In 1576 William Rogers held land in Adgestone, for which he did suit at John Worsley's court at Bembridge. In the middle of the 19th century Adgestone was owned by Mr. E. Horlock, from whom it was purchased by the father of the present owner, Mr. Edward Granville Ward.
