= Municipality of Busselton =

Former local government in Western Australia

The Municipality of Busselton was a local government area in Western Australia, centred on the town of Busselton.

It was established on 21 February 1871, separating the town of Busselton from the surrounding Sussex Road District, which had been created a month prior. The boundary between the two bodies was West Street and Ford Road.

The first election was held at the Busselton Court House on 8 March 1871.

The council was based out of municipal chambers in Queen Street from c. 1900.

The municipal boundaries were extended on 31 August 1928, at which time it was also divided into three wards (West, Central and East).

In 1947, facing a housing shortage, the council undertook what was reputedly the first housing scheme undertaken by a local authority in Western Australia, buying disused buildings from the Busselton Aerodrome from the Commonwealth Government, purchasing land in East Busselton from the State Housing Commission, and re-erecting the old aerodrome buildings as new homes. The scheme resulted in 38 houses, a guest house and two buildings for local sporting bodies.

It ceased to exist on 11 May 1951 when it amalgamated with the Sussex Road District to form the Busselton Road District (now the City of Busselton). The municipal council opposed the merger and had requested a referendum be held, but the state government insisted on immediate amalgamation.

George William Barnard was mayor from 1907 to 1909 and 1915 to 1917.
