= Busselton Aerodrome =

Former airport in Western Australia (1942–1997)

- An aerial photograph of Busselton Aerodrome on 11 November 1941
- IATA: none; ICAO: none

Summary
- Owner: Australian Government
- Operator: Department of Civil Aviation
- Opened: 1942; 84 years ago
- Closed: 1997
- Coordinates: 33°40′23″S 115°20′00.30″E

Map
- Location in Western Australia

Busselton Aerodrome was an airport located southwest of Busselton, in southern Western Australia. It initially operated as a Royal Australian Air Force station during the Second World War, and it began serving civil aviation services to the town when conflicts ceased. It closed in 1997 when a new modern airport opened.

== History ==
In September 1939, 300 hectares of Fairlawn property on Commonage Road were acquired for the establishment of RAAF Station Busselton. On 24 September that year, the Public Works Department called for tenders clearing the area. At the time, a part of the land was heavily wooded. Three runways were cleared, each 220 yards wide by one mile in length. Tenders were closed on 10 October.

Aerial photograph of Busselton Aerodrome on 23 November 1943

Air Board Agenda 3390 in 1941 additionally proposed the establishment of an Operation Station at Busselton, aligned with the decision to expand the Home Defence Units from 19 to 32 RAAF squadrons. The Station was to comprise one General Reconnaissance Squadron with accommodation for 41 officers, 72 sergeants and above, 335 corporals and below. It also included quarters, mess halls, latrine, and recreational facilities. The proposal was approved on 16 August 1941 by the Air Board. On 10 January 1942, camouflaging works on buildings at the airfield were approved at an estimated cost of £3,660.

Initially, Busselton Airfield was thought to have met all requirements without the need for paved runways. However, during the winter of 1941, large areas of the airfield were dampened and wet, with water covering the surface to a depth of several inches in some places. As a result, the construction of a gravelled north-south and east-west runway was approved on 28 February 1942 at an estimated cost of £33,120. In July 1942, the No. 4 Recruit Depot RAAF arrived, providing administrative support to the No. 33 Radar Station at Cape Naturaliste. It had a medical hut at the station. Busselton Aerodrome primarily trained airmen during its tenure. Each week, airmen would arrive for training before being dispatched to Kalgoorlie and Melbourne. Locals were allowed at the airfield to watch aircraft land, such as the Avro Lancaster. Overtime, heavier aircraft could not land as the runway had an inadequate load bearing capacity. The No. 4 Recruit Depot was disbanded in September 1945 following cessations of the conflict.

=== Post-war ===
Following World War II, Busselton Aerodrome was opened for civil aviation in 1947. A weekly service from Perth to Busselton commenced, and it became a country training centre for pilots by 1949. Many of the buildings were converted into housing and were transported to Adelaide Street, while some remained as dormitories for Department of Civil Aviation staff. In 1954, there was uncertainty regarding who held the responsibility for the management of the aerodrome. In the case it would be abandoned, the aerodrome was not considered as developable for housing as it was too remote from the town. The local authority opted to keep the aerodrome, as the Housing Commission purchased land in West Busselton suitable for thirty houses. In November 1955, management of the airfield was transferred to the Civil Aviation Department.

By the 1990s, Busselton Aerodrome was a privately owned landing area with an approximately 1,100 m north–south gravel runway. By this time, it was constrained from expansion into a regional airport, with the proposed Busselton Bypass, part of work on the Bussell Highway, running across it. Beginning in the early 1990s, the Shire began pursuing a replacement aerodrome. In December 1992, the Shire formally forwarded the proposed regional aerodrome to the WA Environmental Protection Authority. Afterwards, eleven sites were recognised, with the Four Mile Hill site being selected for the new airport.

=== Closure ===
After the new Busselton Margaret River Airport opened in 1997, Busselton Aerodrome was closed. The former Medical Hut was transferred to the Busselton Historical Museum, while other buildings were relocated by the RAAF. The cleared land of the aerodrome can still be discerned from aerial imagery.
