= Ernest Locke =

Australian politician (1856–1937)

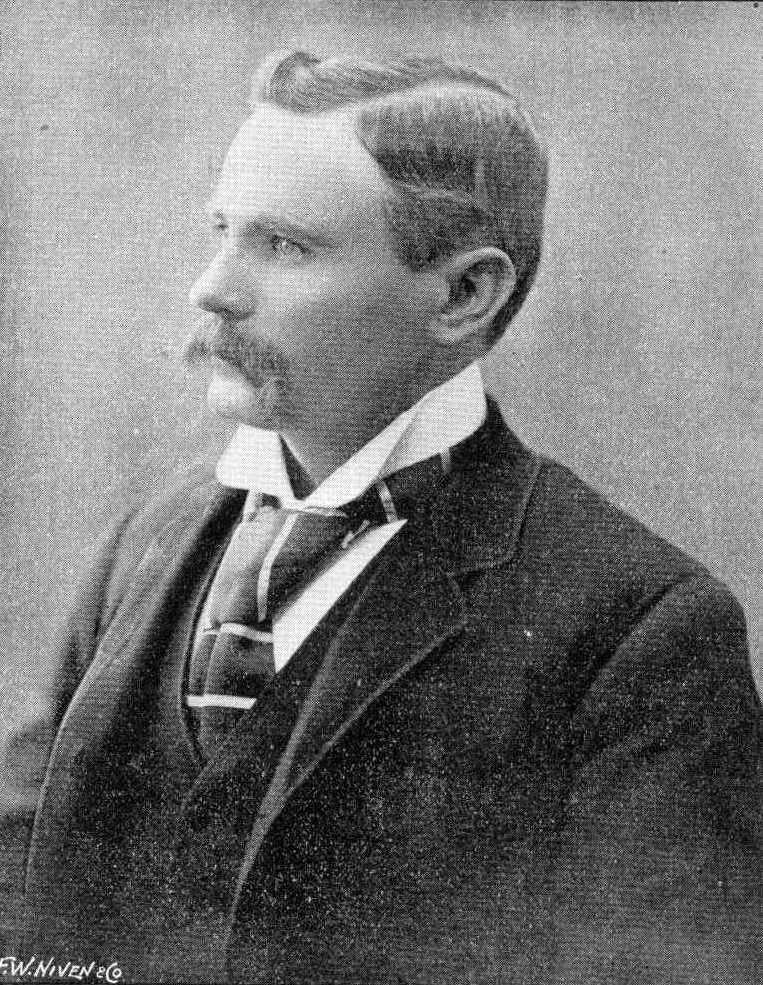

Member of the Legislative Assembly of Western Australia
- In office 3 May 1897 – 24 April 1901
- Preceded by: Joseph Cookworthy
- Succeeded by: Henry Yelverton
- Constituency: Sussex

Personal details
- Born: 9 September 1856 Busselton, Western Australia, Australia
- Died: 5 February 1937 (aged 80) Dalkeith, Western Australia, Australia

Ernest Charles Bavage Locke (9 September 1856 – 5 February 1937) was an Australian politician who was a member of the Legislative Assembly of Western Australia from 1897 to 1901, representing the seat of Sussex.

Locke was born in Busselton, Western Australia, to Mary (née Layman) and John Bavage Locke. His cousin, Charles Layman, was also a member of parliament. Locke farmed at Wonnerup for much of his life, but his chief interest was horse racing, both as a breeder and owner. With his brother, he won the 1886 Mooney Valley Cup with Isonomy and the 1893 Railway Stakes with Lockeville, as well as many other races. Locke was elected to parliament at the 1897 general election, defeating Joseph Cookworthy in Sussex. He lost his seat at the 1901 election to Henry Yelverton, and was unsuccessful in an attempt to reclaim it at the 1904 election. In retirement, Locke lived in Busselton and later in Perth, dying there in February 1937 (aged 80). He never married.

Parliament of Western Australia
Preceded by Joseph Cookworthy	Member for Sussex; 1890–1897	Succeeded by Henry Yelverton
