= Linley Wilson =

Linley Wilson AM
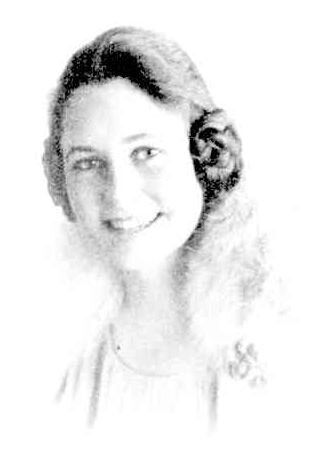
- in 1927 in Woman's World
- Born: Norma Linley Wilson; 28 October 1898; East Perth
- Died: 9 April 1990 (aged 91); Nedlands
- Other names: Linley George
- Spouse: Keith George

Norma Linley Wilson AM known as Linley George but better as Linley Wilson (28 October 1898 – 9 April 1990) was an Australian dancing entrepreneur.

== Life ==
Wilson was born in 1898 in East Perth. She was the penultimate child of nine born to Annie (born Phillips) and Frank Wilson. Her father was a successful politician serving in the parliament of Western Australia. He was the premier of the state twice. She went to Claremont Girls' High School where she gained an enthusiasm for the piano. She went to London to become a concert pianist leaving her work in a music shop. London did not make her a concert pianist but a dancing teacher. She gathered qualifications from the Imperial Society of Teachers of Dancing, and the English Folk Dance Society.

The Linley Wilson School of Dancing opened in 1926 in Perth.

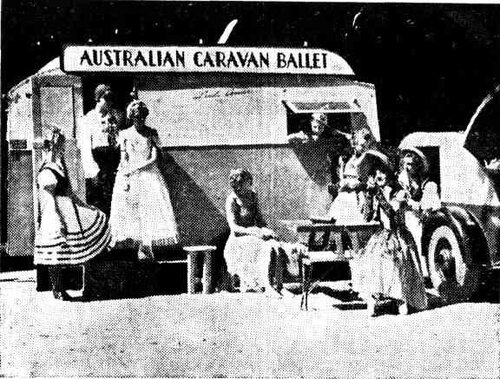
The Australian Caravan Ballet in Women's Realm in 1940

She kept a high profile and continued to study and learn new dances. She enjoyed seeing the Russian ballet when it visited but she dreamed that one day there would be an Australian ballet. In 1940 she formed the Australian Caravan Ballet that was based in two caravans. The first two performances were to nearly full houses. The caravans were still touring in 1953, when the West Australian Ballet Company was formed.

In 1972 her ballet school was sold and two years later Dame Margot Fonteyn successfully nominated her to join the Royal Academy of Dancing's board. In 1978 she became a Member of the Order of Australia (AM).

== Private life ==
She married Keith George when he was on leave during the war in 1942. He was known as a theatre producer.

== Death and legacy ==
Wilson died in 1990 in Nedlands. Her money had been used to pay for nursing for her husband and then for herself. She had hoped to found a chair of dance at the University of Western Australia. This never happened, but the Linley Wilson scholarship was still being awarded in 2020.
