= Maroomba Airlines =

Australian airline

IATA	ICAO	Call sign
KN	MB	Maroomba -
- Founded: 1985
- Fleet size: 5
- Destinations: Golden Grove, Windarling, Noresman, Southern Cross Kalgoorlie
- Parent company: Nantay Pty Ltd
- Headquarters: Perth Airport
- Website: maroomba.com.au

Nantay Pty. Ltd., trading as Maroomba Airlines since 1998, is a small airline and air charter company based in Perth, Western Australia.

== Overview ==
Founded in 1985 as Maroomba Aviation, then renamed Maroomba Air Services in 1997, the airline operates ad hoc charter services around Western Australia.

It operates predominantly fly-in fly-out mining charter contracts and previously also operated a Beechcraft Super King Air and a Hawker 850XP business jet on behalf of the Western Australian government for ministerial transport around the state. In November 2008, Maroomba was selected to operate the Rio Tinto LifeFlight jet, on behalf of the Royal Flying Doctor Service, Western Operations. The Hawker 800XP is the first jet aircraft to be used by the RFDS and allows faster transport of patients around the expanses of WA.

It currently operates a fleet of De Havilland Canada DHC-8 for primarily charter. The fleet consists of one 100 series, three 300 series aircraft.

== Fleet ==
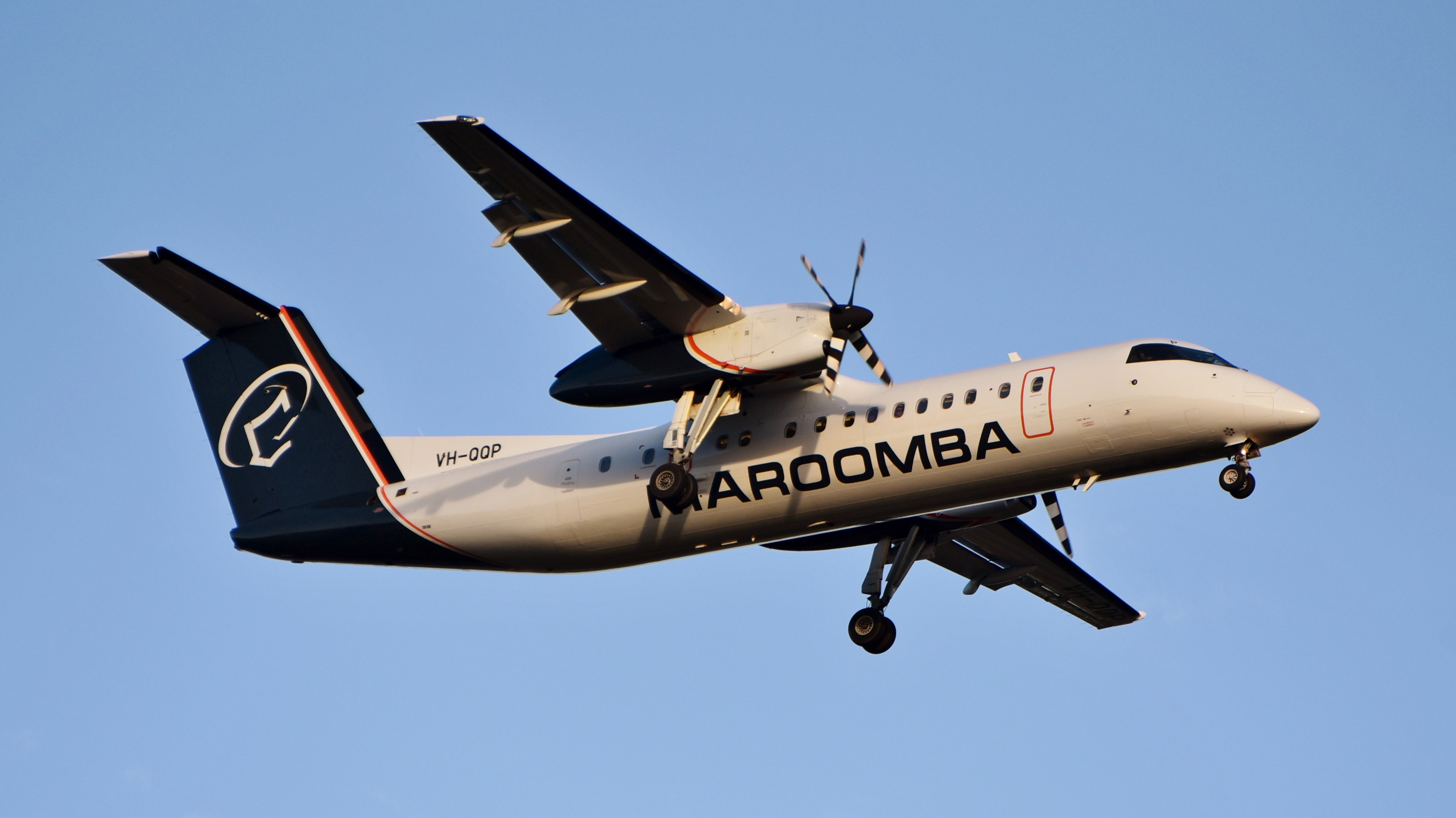
Maroomba DHC-8-300, 2022

As of August 2025, Maroomba Airlines operates the following aircraft:

- 1 De Havilland Canada Dash 8-100
- 4 De Havilland Canada Dash 8-300
