= Alverstone Manor =

- Interactive map of the Alverstone Manor area
- Former names: Alfricheston
- Alternative names: Alvrestone

General information
- Type: Manor house
- Location: Alverstone, United Kingdom

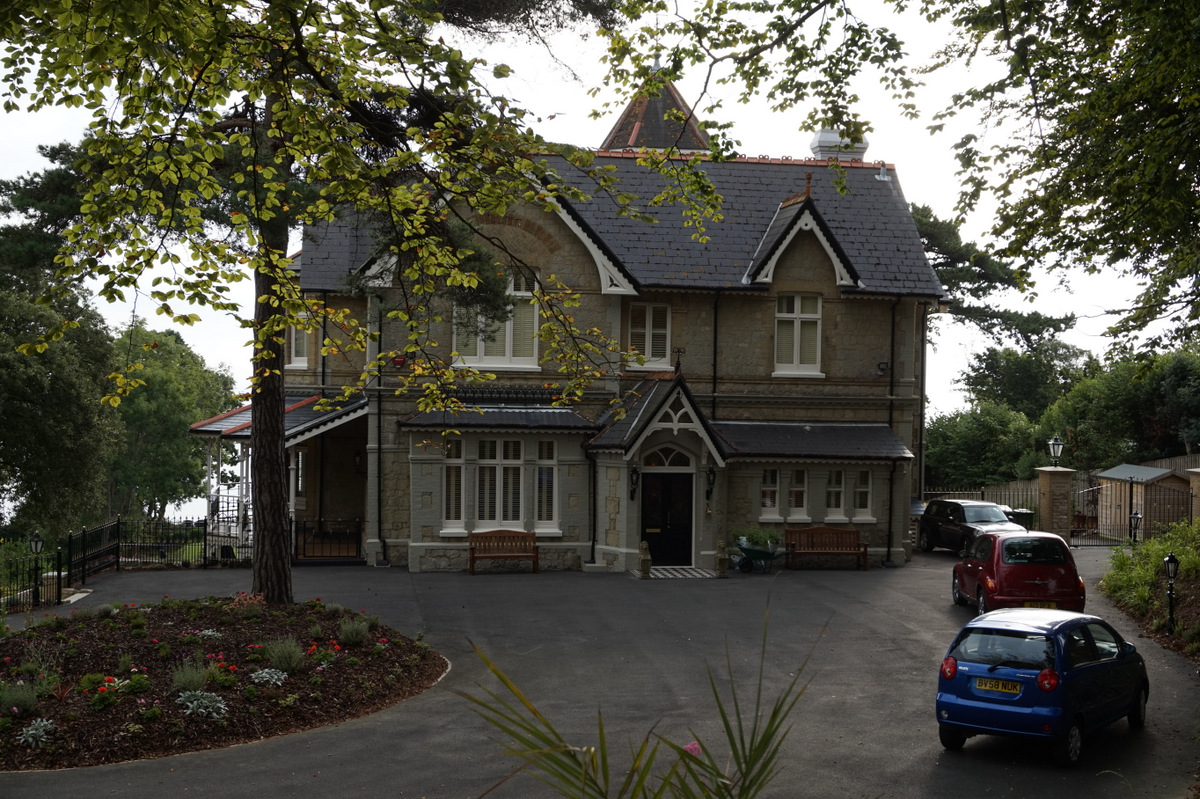
Alverstone Manor on Luccombe Road, Shanklin (2015) by Ian S

Alverstone Manor (also Alvrestone, 11th century; Alfricheston, Aluredeston, 13th century; Alvredeston, 14th century; Auverstone, 16th century) is a manor house in Alverstone in the parish of Brading on the Isle of Wight.

== History ==
It was held before and after the Conquest by William son of Stur. The overlordship passed with Gatcombe until the end of the 13th century at least. At the end of the 13th century William de Aumarle was holding a fee at Alverstone. He died in 1288–9, leaving a son Geoffrey, but the manor seems to have passed to Iseult de Aumarle, who was probably William's widow. She married Geoffrey de Insula (Lisle) of Gatcombe, and he is returned in 1293–4 as holding this fee in her right. Geoffrey de Aumarle died in 1320–1, but he does not seem to have been holding the manor. Geoffrey's son William, however, held it at the time of his death in 1335–6, when it passed to his son William. William the son died without issue, and his sister and co-heir Elizabeth married John Maltravers of Hooke, co. Dorset, by whom she had a daughter Elizabeth. As her second husband she married Sir Humphrey Stafford of Southwick, and they were in possession of the manor in 1402. Elizabeth daughter of Elizabeth and John Maltravers married Sir Humphrey Stafford, son of her mother's second husband, and the manor of Alverstone remained in the Stafford family until the execution of Sir Humphrey Stafford, Earl of Devon, in 1469. Alverstone passed to one of his co-heirs Eleanor Strangways, and was sold in 1556 by her grandson Sir Giles Strangways to Henry Stower. John Stower sold it in 1587 to Peter Fuller. Peter sold it in 1597 to Richard Baskett of Apse, of whose son Richard it was purchased in 1630 by Daniel Broad, contemptuously termed by Sir John Oglander 'a pedlar's son in Newport.' Grace Broad, whose relationship to Daniel is not known, married Alexander Alchorne and had a daughter Grace, who married John Popham and was in possession of the manor in 1713 and 1728. Grace died in 1735, but her husband still held the manor in 1746, (fn. 98) and must shortly after have sold it to Thomas Holmes, created Lord Holmes in 1760. It then passed with Yarmouth until 1859, (fn. 100) when it was sold by William Henry Ashe A'Court - Holmes to Thomas Webster, Q.C., whose son, Lord Alverstone, Lord Chief Justice of England, then held it.
