= George William Barnard =

Australian politician (1873–1941)

George Barnard

Member of the Legislative Assembly of Western Australia
- In office 22 March 1924 – 8 April 1933
- Preceded by: William Pickering
- Succeeded by: Edmund Brockman
- Constituency: Sussex

Personal details
- Born: 17 July 1873 Busselton, Western Australia, Australia
- Died: 21 September 1941 (aged 68) Busselton, Western Australia, Australia
- Party: Nationalist

George William Barnard (17 July 1873 – 21 September 1941) was an Australian politician who was a Nationalist Party member of the Legislative Assembly of Western Australia from 1924 to 1933, representing the seat of Sussex.

Barnard was born in Busselton, Western Australia, to Martha (née Minion) and George William Barnard. He went into partnership with his father, a storekeeper, after leaving school, and eventually came to own a hotel and several other properties. Barnard served on the Busselton Municipal Council for over 20 years, including as mayor from 1907 to 1909 and again from 1915 to 1917. He first stood for parliament at the 1921 state election, but was defeated by William Pickering of the Country Party.

Barnard recontested Sussex in 1924 and was elected with a large majority. He was re-elected in 1927 and 1930, but lost his seat to Edmund Brockman (another Nationalist) in 1933. Barnard died in Busselton in September 1941, aged 68. He had married Eliza Jane Bovell in 1900, with whom he had six children. He was an uncle by marriage of another member of parliament, Sir Stewart Bovell.

Parliament of Western Australia
Preceded by William Pickering	Member for Sussex; 1924–1933	Succeeded by Edmund Brockman
