= Joseph Cookworthy =

Australian politician

Member of the Legislative Assembly of Western Australia
- In office 12 December 1890 – 3 May 1897
- Succeeded by: Ernest Locke
- Constituency: Sussex

Personal details
- Born: 1828 Plymouth, Devon, England
- Died: 21 February 1909 (aged 81) Busselton, Western Australia, Australia

Joseph Cookworthy (1828 – 21 February 1909) was a settler of Western Australia. He arrived in the colony in 1873, having previously been an army officer and civil servant in India. Cookworthy served in the Legislative Assembly of Western Australia from 1890 until 1897, representing the seat of Sussex.

== Early life ==
Cookworthy was born in Plymouth, Devon, England, to Jane (née Urquhart) and Joseph Collier Cookworthy. He trained as a physician, but did not take up the profession, instead joining the British Army. He served with the 14th Dragoons in Persia and India, but after the Indian Mutiny of 1857 joined the Indian Civil Service. Cookworthy came to Western Australia in 1873, settling at Busselton (in the colony's South West region). He was elected to the Sussex Road Board the following year, serving until 1880, and also became a justice of the peace.

== Politics and later life ==
Cookworthy first attempted to enter politics at the 1884 Legislative Council elections, standing in the seat of Vasse. He was defeated by George Layman. At the 1890 general election (the first to be held for the Legislative Assembly), Cookworthy was elected to the seat of Sussex. He retained his seat at the 1894 election, but was defeated by Ernest Locke at the 1897 election.

While in parliament, Cookworthy was twice responsible (in 1893 and 1896) for introducing legislation that would have allowed women to vote in colonial elections for the first time (although only unmarried women meeting the property qualification would gain this right). His attempts were unsuccessful, in part due to the opposition of Sir John Forrest (the premier), although Forrest reversed his position a few years later and women's suffrage became law in 1899. Cookworthy died in Busselton in February 1909, aged 81. His sister, Mary Frances, married Thomas Webster, a prominent English barrister, and was the step-mother of Richard Webster, 1st Viscount Alverstone.

== See also ==
- Members of the Western Australian Legislative Assembly

Parliament of Western Australia
New creation	Member for Sussex; 1890–1897	Succeeded by Ernest Locke
