= Bernie Masters =

Australian politician

Member of the Legislative Assembly of Western Australia
- In office 14 December 1996 – 26 February 2005
- Preceded by: Barry Blaikie
- Succeeded by: Troy Buswell
- Constituency: Vasse

Personal details
- Born: 14 July 1950 (age 76) Perth, Western Australia
- Party: Shooters, Fishers and Farmers
- Other political affiliations: Liberal (to 2004); Independent (from 2004)
- Education: University of Western Australia

Bernard Kent Masters (born 14 July 1950) is a former Australian member of parliament who served as a member of the Legislative Assembly of Western Australia from 1996 to 2005, representing the seat of Vasse. He was a member of the Liberal Party until 2004, when he resigned to sit as an independent.

== Early life ==
Masters was born in Perth, and graduated from the University of Western Australia in 1971 with a Bachelor of Science degree. After graduating, he initially worked as a geologist for Westralian Sands, a mineral sands company. Masters joined the public service in 1976, working as a wildlife officer and fisheries inspector. He returned to Westralian Sands in 1981, where he eventually came to hold senior management positions. He left the company in 1989 and thereafter worked as an environmental and geological consultant.

== Politics ==
Having joined the Liberal Party in 1984, Masters first stood for parliament at the 1987 federal election, unsuccessfully contesting the Division of Brand against Labor's Wendy Fatin. He also ran at the 1990 federal election, standing in the unwinnable fourth position on the Liberal Party's Senate ticket in Western Australia. Masters had success with his third candidacy, winning the seat of Vasse for the Liberal Party at the 1996 state election. He was re-elected at the 2001 election, albeit with a reduced majority. Masters was subsequently included in the new shadow cabinet formed by Colin Barnett, who had replaced Richard Court as Liberal leader after the election loss.

Masters resigned from the Liberal Party in February 2004 after losing preselection for the 2005 state election to Troy Buswell, and thereafter sat as an independent. At the election, Masters polled 20.6 percent of the vote, losing to Buswell on the two-candidate-preferred (2CP) count by just 209 votes. He subsequently served on the Busselton Shire Council from 2008 to 2009. Masters reprised his candidacy against Buswell at the 2013 state election, but polled just 8.0 percent on first preferences and failed to make the 2CP count. He later joined the Shooters, Fishers and Farmers Party, and contested the seat of Bunbury for that party at the 2017 state election.

== See also ==
- Members of the Western Australian Legislative Council
