= West Busselton =

Suburb of Busselton, Western Australia

- Suburb
- Interactive map of West Busselton
- Coordinates: 33°39′S 115°20′E
- Country: Australia
- State: Western Australia
- City: Busselton
- LGA: City of Busselton
- Location: 2 km (1.2 mi) from Busselton
- Established: 1938

Government
  - State electorate: Vasse
  - Federal division: Forrest

Area
  - Total: 8.2 km^{2} (3.2 sq mi)

Population
  - Total: 8,869 (SAL 2021)
- Time zone: UTC+8 (AWST)
- Postcode: 6280

West Busselton is a suburb of the Western Australian city of Busselton. At the 2021 census, it had a population of 8,869.

Buildings from the 1850s, 1860s, and 1870s in the suburb include Broadwater Homestead, the home of Alfred Bussell, "the Gulch", a police residence, bond store and custom officer's residence, and Phoebe Abbey's House. West Busselton was declared as a townsite in 1938, by which time it was a residential area. West Busselton Primary School was established in 1965. The suburb also contains a government high school, Busselton Senior High School, along with two private schools, St Mary MacKillop College and Cornerstone Christian College. The Busselton Health Campus is in West Busselton.
