= William Willmott =

Australian politician (1895–1947)

Member of the Legislative Assembly of Western Australia
- In office 12 February 1938 – 2 May 1947
- Preceded by: Edmund Brockman
- Succeeded by: Stewart Bovell
- Constituency: Sussex

Personal details
- Born: 16 May 1895 Busselton, Western Australia, Australia
- Died: 2 May 1947 (aged 51) Busselton, Western Australia
- Party: Nationalist (to 1945); Liberal (from 1945)

William Henry Francis Willmott (16 May 1895 – 2 May 1947) was an Australian politician who was a member of the Legislative Assembly of Western Australia from 1938 until his death, representing the seat of Sussex.

Willmott was born in Busselton, in Western Australia's South West region. His uncle, Francis Edward Sykes Willmott, and first cousin, Francis Drake Willmott, were both also members of parliament. As a boy, Willmott lived at the Cape Leeuwin Lighthouse for several years, where his father was the lighthouse keeper. He enlisted in the Australian Imperial Force in April 1916, and during the war served as a private with the 16th and 32nd Battalions. While fighting at Zonnebeke, Belgium, Willmott lost one of his legs. After the war's end, he returned to Busselton to farm, and also served on the board of a dairy company. Representing the Nationalist Party, Willmott was elected to parliament at the 1938 Sussex by-election, which had been caused by the death of the sitting member, Edmund Brockman (a brother-in-law of Willmott's uncle). During the election campaign, he drove his car into a tree, which sent him into a brief coma and resulted in a broken rib and a severe concussion. Willmott retained his seat at the 1939, 1943, and 1947 state elections. However, he died in office in May 1947 (aged 51), after an extended illness.

Parliament of Western Australia
Preceded by Edmund Brockman	Member for Sussex; 1938–1947	Succeeded by Stewart Bovell
