= Yelverton Pass =

Mountain pass in Nunavut, Canada

- Location within Nunavut

Third Approach
- Location: Nunavut, Canada
- Coordinates: 81°40′07″N 78°19′48″W
- Topo map: NTS 340D12 Yelverton Lake

Yelverton Pass is a mountain pass on northern Ellesmere Island, Nunavut, Canada.
