= Busselton Senior High School =

Location
- West Busselton, South West region, Western Australia; Australia; 33°39′24″S 115°19′30″E

Information
- Type: Public co-educational high day school
- Motto: Latin: Finis Coronat Opus
- Established: 1952; 74 years ago
- Educational authority: WA Department of Education
- Principal: Jennifer McMahon
- Years: 7–12
- Enrolment: 594 (2025)
- Campus: West Busselton
- Colours: Blue, white and gold
- Website: www.busseltonshs.wa.edu.au

Busselton Senior High School is a comprehensive public co-educational high day school, located in the Busselton suburb of West Busselton in the South West region. As of 2021, the school had 672 students.

The school was established in 1952 as Busselton Junior High School, serving students from primary years up to year 10. In 1958, it was made a three-year high school and it was separated from the primary school in 1960. In 1962, it became a five-year high school. The land on which it is situated previously belonged to Carlo and Flora Sayers, a pioneering Busselton family, who had both expressed wishes that their land be used for an educational institution after their death; Flora died in 1955 and the land was then transferred to the Education Department.

The school was struck by tragedy in 1980 when in the May holidays, a number of students from Busselton Senior High School flew out of Perth Airport for a school excursion in New South Wales. After landing in Adelaide the students boarded buses to drive through outback areas of South Australia and New South Wales. Just out of the town of Hay on Mothers Day one of the buses ran off the Sturt Highway, resulting in the deaths of the Adelaide bus driver John Mackenzie and two students Tracy Blum and Ann Lloyd both aged 15 years. With so many people injured much of the town of Hay was mobilized to help.

Parts of the school including the Administration area, Staffroom and Geographe Education Support Centre were vandalised and then set alight in September 2009 causing an estimated $150,000 in damage.

A longstanding competitor in the High School Country Week tournament the school won the champion school award in 1986 and 1996.

In 2015, the school introduced Year 7 students into the high school.

== See also ==
- List of schools in rural Western Australia
