= Thomas Webster (lawyer) =

English barrister

Thomas Webster (1810–1875) was an English barrister, known for his involvement in patent legislation, and for committee work leading up to The Great Exhibition.

== Life ==
He was born on 16 October 1810, the eldest son of Thomas Webster, vicar of Oakington, Cambridgeshire. From Charterhouse School he went to Trinity College, Cambridge, and graduated B.A. as fourteenth wrangler in 1832, proceeding M.A. in 1835.

In 1837 Webster became secretary to the Institution of Civil Engineers. In 1839 he resigned the post, but remained honorary secretary till 1841. In that year he was called to the bar at Lincoln's Inn, and joined the northern circuit.

Webster built up a practice in scientific cases, and was recognised as an authority on patent law. He played a major part in the reforming Patent Law Amendment Act 1852. He had also a parliamentary practice. He was one of the counsel engaged for Birkenhead in the contests over the Liverpool and Mersey docks.

Webster was on the governing body of the Society of Arts, a significant member of the reforming group in the Society of the mid-1840s; others were George Bailey, John Bethell, John Scott Russell, Edward Speer, William Tooke, and Joseph Woods. He was in the chair at the meeting of the society in 1845 when the first proposal was made for holding the International Exhibition of 1851, and was a member of initial committee appointed to organise it.

Webster was elected a Fellow of the Royal Society in 1847, and in 1865 he was appointed Queen's Counsel. He died in London on 3 June 1875.

== Works ==
Webster's Reports and Notes of Cases on Letters Patent for Inventions (1844) became a standard textbook. In 1848 he published a handbook The Ports and Docks of Birkenhead. In 1853 and 1857 he republished the reports of the acting committee of the conservators of the Mersey.

== Family ==
Webster married twice. Firstly, in 1839, he married Elizabeth, eldest daughter of Richard Calthrop of Swineshead Abbey, Lincolnshire. His second wife was Mary Frances, daughter of Joseph Collier Cookworthy (of Plymouth), and sister of Joseph Cookworthy, a member of parliament in Western Australia. By his first wife he had three sons, the second being Richard Everard Webster, and two daughters; by his second wife he had one son and one daughter.

== Notes ==
Attribution

This article incorporates text from a publication now in the public domain: "Webster, Thomas (1810-1875)". Dictionary of National Biography. London: Smith, Elder & Co. 1885–1900.
