= Electoral district of Sussex =

Former electoral district of Western Australia

Sussex Western Australia—Legislative Assembly
- State: Western Australia
- Dates current: 1890–1950

Sussex was an electoral district of the Legislative Assembly in the Australian state of Western Australia from 1890 to 1950.

The district was based in south-western Western Australia, including areas such as Busselton and Margaret River, and was named for the Sussex land district which formed its original boundaries. It was one of the original 30 seats contested at the 1890 election. It was safely conservative for its entire existence, and was always held by a member of the Liberal Party (or its predecessors) or the Country Party. From 1904 to 1917, the district's representative was Frank Wilson, who served as Premier of Western Australia from 1910 to 1911 and again from 1916 to 1917.

Sussex was abolished at the 1950 election, and replaced with the new seat of Vasse. Its last member, Stewart Bovell of the Liberal Party, transferred to Vasse.

== Members ==
Member	Party	Term
Joseph Cookworthy	Non-aligned	1890–1897
Ernest Locke	Ministerial	1897–1901
Henry Yelverton	Ministerial	1901–1904
Frank Wilson	Independent	1904–1905
Frank Wilson	Ministerial	1905–1911
Frank Wilson	Liberal	1911–1917
Frank Wilson	Independent	1917
William Pickering	Country	1917–1923
William Pickering	Country (ECP)	1923–1924
George Barnard	Nationalist	1924–1933
Edmund Brockman	Nationalist	1933–1938
William Willmott	Nationalist	1938–1945
William Willmott	Liberal	1945–1947
Stewart Bovell	Liberal	1947–1949
Stewart Bovell	LCL	1949–1950
