= Barry Blaikie =

Australian politician

Member of the Legislative Assembly of Western Australia
- In office 20 February 1971 – 14 December 1996
- Preceded by: Stewart Bovell
- Succeeded by: Bernie Masters
- Constituency: Vasse

Personal details
- Born: 1 April 1935 Margaret River, Western Australia, Australia
- Died: 16 May 2012 (aged 77) Wembley, Western Australia, Australia
- Party: Liberal

Barry Roy Blaikie (1 April 1935 – 16 May 2012) was an Australian politician who was a Liberal Party member of the Legislative Assembly of Western Australia from 1971 to 1996, representing the seat of Vasse.

Blaikie was born in Margaret River, a small town in Western Australia's South West region. He attended primary school in Cowaramup before going on to Bunbury High School, and after leaving school worked as a dairy farmer. Blaikie was elected to the Shire of Augusta-Margaret River council in 1965, serving until 1971. A member of the Liberal Party from 1958, he stood for parliament at the 1971 state election, replacing the retiring Stewart Bovell as member for Vasse. In 1982, Blaikie was made chairman of committees in the Legislative Assembly, although he only served until the 1983 state election, when the Liberal government was defeated. Between 1983 and 1993, he was a member of the shadow ministries of Ray O'Connor, Bill Hassell, Barry MacKinnon and Richard Court, during their respective terms as leader of the opposition. Blaikie left parliament at the 1996 election (replaced by Bernie Masters), having been Father of the House for the preceding three years.

Parliament of Western Australia
Preceded by Stewart Bovell	Member for Vasse; 1971–1996	Succeeded by Bernie Masters
