= Edmund Vernon Brockman =

Australian politician (1882–1938)

Member of the Legislative Assembly of Western Australia
- In office 8 April 1933 – 4 January 1938
- Preceded by: George Barnard
- Succeeded by: William Willmott
- Constituency: Sussex

Personal details
- Born: 28 April 1882 Pemberton, Western Australia
- Died: 4 January 1938 (aged 55) Busselton, Western Australia
- Party: Nationalist

Edmund Vernon Brockman (28 April 1882 – 4 January 1938) was an Australian politician who was a Nationalist Party member of the Legislative Assembly of Western Australia from 1933 until his death, representing the seat of Sussex.

Brockman was born in Pemberton, in Western Australia's South West region, to Capel Carter (née Bussell) and Edward Reveley Brockman. Both his grandfathers, John Garrett Bussell and William Locke Brockman, were prominent early settlers of Western Australia, as was a great-uncle, Edmund Ralph Brockman, for whom he was named. Brockman attended Hale School, Perth, and Way College, Adelaide, and after leaving school farmed at Nannup. He was elected to the Nannup Road Board in 1909, and served on the board for most of his life, including as chairman for over 20 years. At the 1933 state election, Brockman won the seat of Sussex, replacing George Barnard. He was re-elected at the 1936 election, but died in office in January 1938, after a short illness. Brockman's brother-in-law, Francis Edward Sykes Willmott, and nephew, Francis Drake Willmott, were also members of parliament.

Parliament of Western Australia
| Preceded by George Barnard | Member for Sussex; 1933–1938 | Succeeded by William Willmott |
