= Troy Buswell =

Australian politician

The Honourable Troy Buswell
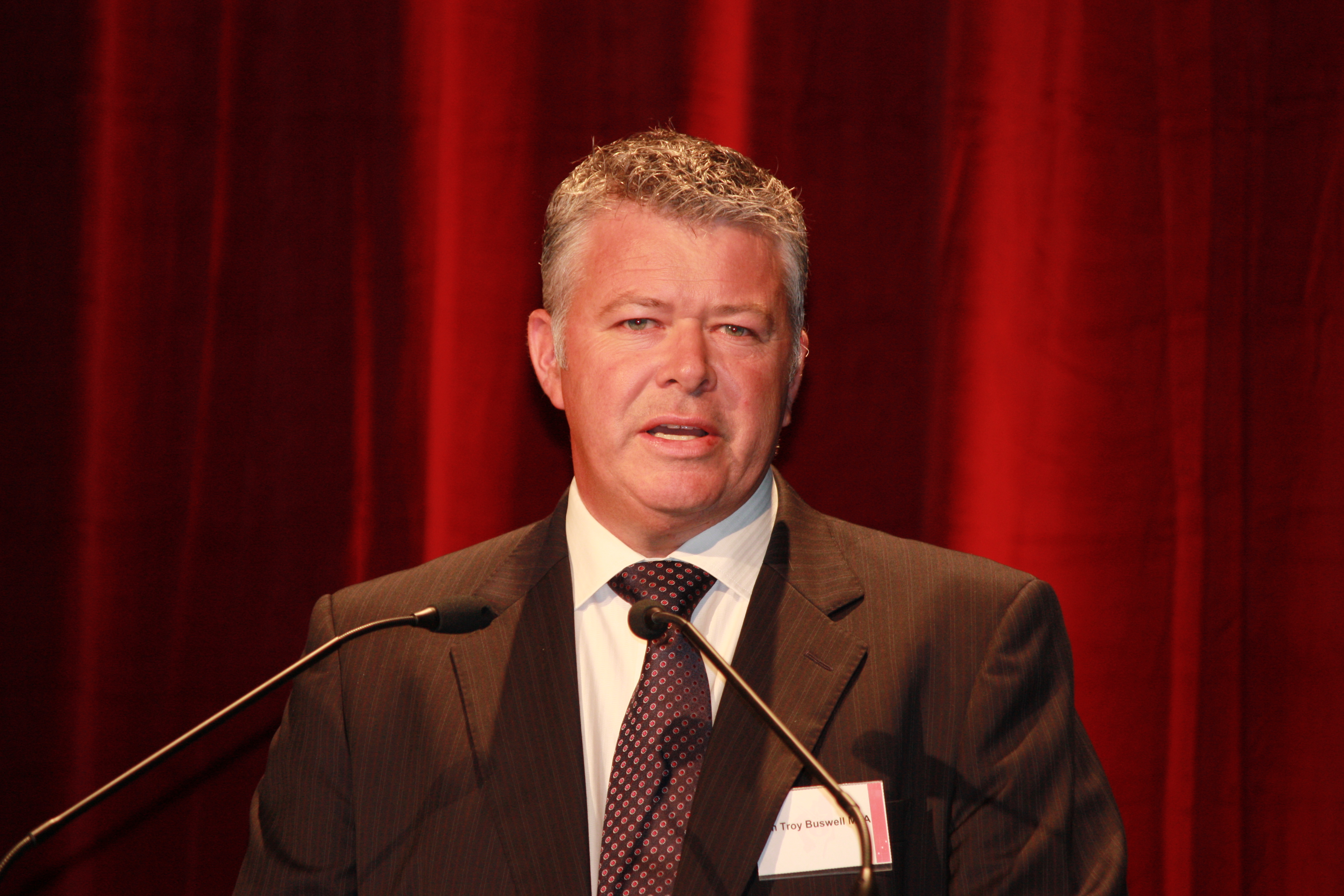

Treasurer of Western Australia
- In office 7 July 2012 – 10 March 2014
- Preceded by: Colin Barnett
- Succeeded by: Colin Barnett
- In office 23 September 2008 – 27 April 2010
- Preceded by: Eric Ripper
- Succeeded by: Colin Barnett

Leader of the Opposition of Western Australia
- In office 17 January 2008 – 4 August 2008
- Premier: Alan Carpenter
- Deputy: Kim Hames
- Preceded by: Paul Omodei
- Succeeded by: Colin Barnett

Member of the Western Australian Parliament for Vasse
- In office 26 February 2005 – 3 September 2014
- Preceded by: Bernie Masters
- Succeeded by: Libby Mettam

Personal details
- Born: Troy Raymond Buswell; 19 March 1966 (age 60) Bunbury, Western Australia
- Party: Liberal Party

Troy Raymond Buswell (born 19 March 1966) is an Australian former politician who was a Liberal member of the Western Australian Legislative Assembly from 2005 to 2014, representing the seat of Vasse. He was Treasurer of Western Australia in the Barnett Ministry from 2008 to 2010 and from 2012 to 2014, and also held several other portfolios.

From Busselton, Western Australia, and educated at the University of Western Australia, Buswell was Leader of the Opposition for several months in 2008, before being replaced by Colin Barnett, and was then named Treasurer following the Liberal Party's victory at the 2008 state election. He resigned from the ministry in April 2010 following allegations of improper use of ministerial allowances during an extramarital affair with Greens MLA Adele Carles, the Member for Fremantle. Buswell was re-appointed to the ministry in December 2010 as Minister for Transport and Minister for Housing, and regained the post of Treasurer in July 2012.

After taking several days personal leave early in the month, he resigned from Cabinet on 10 March 2014. The Premier said that Buswell had suffered a breakdown and had received hospital treatment in Perth and a clinic in Sydney. He resigned from parliament on 3 September 2014, citing his health as being incompatible with public life.

== Early life and local government career ==
Buswell was born in the regional city of Bunbury, Western Australia. He was educated at Busselton Senior High School and later attained a Bachelor of Economics at University of Western Australia, where in 1986 he won the W.G. Salter Memorial Prize in Economics, which is awarded annually to the top student enrolled for the degree of Bachelor of Economics.

In 1992, he became the director of Villa Carlotta Group, which provided bus tours in the Busselton region, and also became involved with the Cape Naturaliste Tourism Association. On 14 November 1992, he married Margaret Cummins, with whom he had two sons Jacob and Samuel.

He served as a councillor with the Shire of Busselton in 1995–1996, and again in 2001–2003, before becoming its Shire President at the 2003 local government elections. He stepped down to contest the state election for the Liberal Party in the seat of Vasse, which is centred on Busselton. Some controversy arose over his preselection as he was chosen over the sitting member, Bernie Masters, who blamed then-deputy leader Dan Sullivan for the decision, quit the party and ran for the seat as an independent. However, Buswell won the contest by 209 votes.

== Deputy leadership ==
With the unexpected resignation of Deputy Opposition Leader Paul Omodei in October 2005, Buswell was elected by the party room to replace Omodei in the role, serving under Matt Birney. Omodei went on to successful challenge for the leadership in March 2006, with Buswell remaining as deputy. By August 2007, polling numbers had fallen below 14%, and media commentators speculated that Omodei would be replaced with Buswell within six months if he could not improve polling by the end of the year. However, Buswell was being investigated by the Corruption and Crime Commission over allegations that he had met former Liberal powerbroker Noel Crichton-Browne, who was working as a lobbyist in conjunction with former premier Brian Burke, in a carpark to discuss the Canal Rocks development at Smiths Beach in Yallingup while he was still mayor of Busselton. On 9 October 2007, he was cleared by the CCC of any wrongdoing and pressure upon Omodei immediately increased. Former party leader Colin Barnett, however, dismissed its significance, claiming Buswell would lead the Liberal Party at some future point but did not yet have the experience.

On 28 November 2007, just after the 2007 federal election which saw a new Labor government under Kevin Rudd come into power, rumours of a push within the Liberal Party to install Buswell as state leader were reported in the media. Omodei, however, promised to "land a good right hook" on anyone asking him to stand aside, and asked for a "fair go" while announcing a swathe of new policies for the party. On 23 December 2007, it was reported that Buswell was moving his family to Shenton Park in Perth's inner western suburbs due to lengthy periods of time away from his family.

== Leader of the Opposition ==
On 17 January 2008, Buswell announced he would challenge Omodei's leadership. After a spill motion carried, Omodei did not contest the ensuing leadership vote, and Buswell defeated Shadow Minister for Police and Justice Rob Johnson to become the new leader.

In the following media conference, he refused to comment on allegations relating to a drunken night at parliament, where he snapped the back of a female Labor party staffer's bra-strap as a "party trick", and other "inappropriate and sexist behaviour".

On 27 April 2008 further allegations were published: these included the sniffing of a chair of a female Liberal staffer as well as claims that he crawled around on his hands and knees pretending to be the staffer's husband. Buswell first refused to deny the allegations, and then subsequently admitted to the act. The woman later revealed Buswell "was groaning and writhing in sexual pleasure".

As well as these incidents, Buswell has been accused by retiring Liberal MLA for Carine, Katie Hodson-Thomas, of making sexist remarks to her.

MLA for Roe Graham Jacobs called for a leadership spill motion, which took place on 5 May 2008, but the motion failed and Buswell remained leader.

Revelations also came out of Buswell "squirrel gripping" (grabbing the testicles of) Liberal MLA Murray Cowper in parliament. Cowper did not deny the incident, saying "As far as I'm concerned the matter's dead and it's time for everyone to move on, the media included."

Buswell faced a fresh crisis when it was revealed in a Corruption and Crime Commission (CCC) report on 10 June 2008 that a motion moved in Parliament by his staunchest backer, Shadow Minister for Road Safety John McGrath, had been provided to him by lobbyists Brian Burke and Julian Grill. Burke had written the motion on behalf of a company that sold radar detectors. The CCC report said Mr McGrath's claim he was unaware of Burke's commercial interest in the issue strained credibility. Buswell backed McGrath by claiming that he had been cleared of misconduct while McGrath refused to stand down.

Three days later, Buswell sacked the Shadow Police Minister Rob Johnson after Johnson said he could not serve in the Shadow Cabinet with McGrath as Shadow Minister for Road Safety.

Buswell resigned as Liberal leader and leader of the opposition on 4 August 2008. He was replaced by Colin Barnett.

== Government ==
After resigning as leader, Buswell was granted a place on the Opposition front bench as Shadow Treasurer under new leader Colin Barnett. Following the state election in September 2008, where the incumbent Labor government was defeated and the National Party agreed to vote with the Liberal Party in the hung parliament, Buswell was named as Treasurer in Colin Barnett's new Cabinet.

On 24 April 2010, Greens MP Adele Carles publicly stated that Buswell and herself had been engaged in an affair that lasted several months. Buswell himself gave a public statement on 26 April confirming this and that he had used a ministerial car and a government credit card to pay for accommodation for himself and Carles. On 27 April, the premier demanded, and obtained, his resignation as a member of the ministry, although Buswell continued as the member for Vasse.

Buswell was cleared of any misuse of public entitlements by Public Sector Commissioner Mal Wauchope's report which was tabled to state parliament by premier Colin Barnett on 23 June 2010. The premier indicated that Buswell would not be considered for a cabinet position until the end of the year. He was re-appointed to the ministry as Minister for Transport and Minister for Housing on 14 December 2010.

== Controversies ==
During his political career, Buswell has been involved in a number of controversies.

In January 2008, allegations arose of an incident the previous year where Buswell had snapped the elastic bra strap of a Labor staffer. Buswell later confirmed this and publicly apologised for the incident.

In April 2008, it was alleged that Buswell had "sniffed the chair of a Liberal staffer, writhing in mock sexual pleasure", which he denied, and then subsequently admitted to, apologising once more.

In August 2008, Liberal backbencher Murray Cowper mentioned that Buswell grabbed him in the crotch, but that it was an incident that had been resolved between them both.

In October 2009, Buswell admitted to filing a false claim for a living away from home allowance, which he attributed to a clerical error. He later repaid the money. The following month, another travel allowance mistake was found.

In April 2010 news of an extra-marital affair with Adele Carles was reported, and in the aftermath of the affair, Buswell admitted to misusing entitlements to facilitate the affair. He and Carles were subsequently cleared by the Public Sector Commissioner of misusing entitlements.

In December 2010, Buswell took up the position of Housing and Transport Minister; three months later it was revealed that he had committed nine speeding offences in the previous three years.

In December 2012, Carles accused Buswell of having "dry humped" a businessman at a party in 2011. Buswell launched a defamation case against her; this was subsequently settled out of court with Carles issuing written apologies to the parties involved.

In March 2014, Buswell resigned from his position as Treasurer and Transport Minister due to a mental health breakdown.

In May 2014 Buswell was convicted and fined for 11 motor vehicle offences whilst holding the cabinet position of Minister for Transport. These fines related to careless driving, failing to stop at a crash and failing to report an accident on the night of 22 February 2014. From an independent eyewitness report to police on the night, it was indicated that Buswell was suffering from impaired coordination whilst driving and after returning to his Subiaco home. The fines totalled $3,100 and his driver's licence was suspended for 12 months.

Following his resignation as Transport Minister, accusations of plagiarism were made against Buswell for a report into light rail. He was accused of plagiarising large sections of a report written during a taxpayer funded trip to Europe and Asia.

In an interview just prior to his defeat at the 2017 election Premier Colin Barnett stated that Buswell could have succeeded him as Premier if Buswell "hadn't gone off the rails".

In February 2020, Buswell was charged with six aggravated assault charges against a woman known to him and one count of unlawful damage. The alleged offences took place over four years between 2015 and 2019. The woman was revealed to be his ex-wife Melissa Hankinson. Buswell was subsequently prosecuted on six counts of domestic violence relating to alleged assaults on Hankinson. The trial on these charges, in the Perth Magistrates Court, was part-heard in late May 2021. Buswell ultimately pleaded guilty to three charges of domestic violence against his ex-wife, and was given a suspended sentence of eight and a half months in prison for the most serious offence, and fined $2500 for the other two offences. All other charges were dropped.

== List of portfolios ==
Buswell has held the following portfolios since his election in 2005 (both shadow and government appointments are listed):

- 9 March 2005 – 20 March 2005: Shadow Minister for Youth Affairs
- 20 March 2005 – 22 May 2005: Shadow Minister for Youth Affairs; Shadow Minister for Small Business and Industrial Relations
- 22 May 2005 – 8 November 2005: Shadow Minister for Small Business and Industrial Relations
- 8 November 2005 – 17 January 2008: Deputy Leader of the Opposition; Shadow Minister for Small Business and Industrial Relations
- 17 January 2008 – 23 January 2008: Leader of the Opposition; Shadow Minister for Small Business and Industrial Relations
- 23 January 2008 – 4 August 2008: Leader of the Opposition; Shadow Minister for Trade
- 4 August 2008 – 6 September 2008: Shadow Treasurer
- 23 September 2008 – 28 April 2010: Treasurer; Minister for Commerce; Minister for Science and Innovation; Minister for Housing and Works
- 14 December 2010 – 6 December 2011: Minister for Transport; Minister for Housing
- 6 December 2011 – 10 July 2012: Minister for Transport; Minister for Housing; Minister for Emergency Services
- 10 July 2012 – 13 July 2012: Treasurer; Minister for Transport; Minister for Housing; Minister for Emergency Services
- 13 July 2012 – 21 March 2013: Treasurer; Minister for Transport; Minister for Emergency Services
- 21 March 2013 – 11 December 2013: Treasurer; Minister for Transport; Minister for Fisheries
- 11 December 2013 – 10 March 2014 : Treasurer; Minister for Transport

== Bibliography ==
- "Inaugural speech" (PDF). Parliament of W.A. 31 March 2005.
- Who's Who in Australia (2007), p. 376

Political offices
Preceded by Paul Omodei	Leader of the Opposition (Western Australia); 2008	Succeeded by Colin Barnett
Party political offices
Preceded by Paul Omodei	Leader of the Liberal Party in Western Australia; 2008	Succeeded by Colin Barnett
Western Australian Legislative Assembly
Preceded by Bernie Masters	Member for Vasse; 2005–2014	Succeeded by Libby Mettam
