= Electoral district of Vasse =

State electoral district of Western Australia

Vasse Western Australia—Legislative Assembly
- Interactive map of electoral district boundaries from the 2025 state election
- State: Western Australia
- Dates current: 1950–present
- MP: Libby Mettam
- Party: Liberal
- Namesake: Vasse River
- Electors: 33,299 (2025)
- Area: 1,611 km^{2} (622.0 sq mi)
- Demographic: Provincial and rural
- Coordinates: 33.67°S 115.24°E
Electorates around Vasse:
Indian Ocean	Indian Ocean	Bunbury
Indian Ocean	Vasse	Collie-Preston
Indian Ocean	Warren-Blackwood	Warren-Blackwood

Vasse is an electoral district of the Legislative Assembly in Western Australia. Vasse is based in the South West region of the state, centred on the town of Busselton and is named for the Vasse River. It has been a safe seat for the Liberal Party at all times since its creation, including as its previous incarnation, Sussex.

The current MLA, Liberal Libby Mettam, won a by-election on 18 October 2014 following the resignation of former Liberal leader Troy Buswell.

== Geography ==
Originally centred on Geographe Bay and Busselton, the redistribution ahead of the 2008 state election expanded the electorate south to include large parts of the Shire of Augusta-Margaret River which had formerly been in Warren-Blackwood prior to that district's abolition. Apart from Busselton and its suburbs, the Vasse district includes the towns of Vasse, Dunsborough/Quindalup, Yallingup, Margaret River, Cowaramup, Gracetown and Prevelly as well as part of Witchcliffe.

== History ==
Vasse was first created for the 1950 state election out of the former seat of Sussex. It is a historically safe seat for the Liberal Party, which has held the seat continuously since its foundation. Indeed, counting its time as Sussex, it has been in the hands of the Liberals and their predecessors since the first Legislative Assembly was convened in 1890. The only time it has been out of the hands of a conservative party was when sitting Liberal Bernie Masters resigned to sit as an independent in 2004–05.

Vasse had only two members in its first 46 years, Stewart Bovell (1950–1971) and Barry Blaikie (1971–1996). Masters succeeded Blaikie at the 1996 state election, but lost preselection for a third term ahead of the 2005 election in favour of then Shire of Busselton mayor Troy Buswell. Masters resigned from the party and contested the election as an independent, but was defeated by Buswell. Buswell served as Liberal leader from January to August 2008, and as Treasurer from 2008 to 2010 and from 2012 to 2014. Buswell resigned in 2014 after a drink-driving controversy, and was succeeded at the resulting by-election by Libby Mettam. The by-election, which was not contested by the opposition Labor Party, saw the National Party cut the Liberal margin in Vasse to less than 4%.

== Members for Vasse ==
Member	Party	Term
Stewart Bovell	Liberal Country League	1950–1968
Stewart Bovell	Liberal	1968–1971
Barry Blaikie	Liberal	1971–1996
Bernie Masters	Liberal	1996–2004
Bernie Masters	Independent	2004–2005
Troy Buswell	Liberal	2005–2014
Libby Mettam	Liberal	2014–present

== Election results ==
2025 Western Australian state election: Vasse
Party	Candidate	Votes	%	±%
Liberal	Libby Mettam	14,511	52.0	+7.5
Labor	Evan Lewis	6,499	23.3	−11.5
Greens	Mia Krasenstein	3,814	13.7	+4.2
One Nation	Steve Kefalinos	1,352	4.8	+3.8
Legalise Cannabis	Shelley Leech	1,097	3.9	+2.5
Christians	Stephen Cox	621	2.2	+2.2
Total formal votes		27,894	95.9	−0.6
Informal votes		1,190	4.1	+0.6
Turnout		29,084	87.3	+5.4
Two-party-preferred result
Liberal	Libby Mettam	17,688	63.4	+9.1
Labor	Evan Lewis	10,196	36.6	−9.1
Liberal hold		Swing	+9.1	
