= Stewart Bovell =

Australian politician

Sir Stewart Bovell

Agent-General for Western Australia
- In office 1971–1974
- Preceded by: Gerald Wild
- Succeeded by: Jim Richards

Minister for Lands, Forests and Immigration
- In office 2 April 1959 – 3 March 1971
- Premier: David Brand
- Preceded by: Herb Graham (Forests); Lionel Kelly (Lands)
- Succeeded by: Tom Evans (Forests); David Evans (Lands and Immigration)

Minister for Labour
- In office 16 November 1961 – 11 April 1962
- Premier: David Brand
- Preceded by: Charles Perkins
- Succeeded by: Gerald Wild

Member of the Western Australian Parliament for Sussex
- In office June 1947 – 1950
- Preceded by: William Willmott
- Succeeded by: Seat abolished

Member of the Western Australian Parliament for Vasse
- In office 1950–1971
- Preceded by: New creation
- Succeeded by: Barry Blaikie

Personal details
- Born: William Stewart Bovell; 19 December 1906 Busselton, Western Australia
- Died: 15 September 1999 (aged 92)
- Citizenship: Australian
- Party: Liberal

Military service
- Allegiance: Australia
- Branch/service: RAAF
- Years of service: ?–1945
- Rank: Flight lieutenant

Sir William Stewart Bovell (19 December 1906 – 15 September 1999) was an Australian politician who was a member of the Western Australian Legislative Assembly for the electorates of Sussex and Vasse between 1947 and 1971. Bovell served as a minister for over a decade under the premiership of David Brand.

== Early life ==
Bovell was born in Busselton, Western Australia in 1906. He attended the Busselton Central School.

During World War II, he served in the Royal Australian Air Force (RAAF), reaching the rank of flight lieutenant.

== Public life ==
After the death of sitting member for Sussex, William Willmott, Bovell was endorsed by the Liberal Party for the seat. At the resultant by-election in June 1947, Bovell was elected to the Western Australian Parliament, winning an absolute majority of votes against two unendorsed Liberal candidates. His uncle, George Barnard had held the seat between 1924 and 1933. Sussex was abolished in 1950, and Bovell followed most of his constituents into the new seat of Vasse, which he held without difficulty for the rest of his career.

In 1959 Bovell was appointed Minister for Lands, Forests and Immigration, serving in these ministries until 1971. Between 1961 and 1962 he also took the role of Minister for Labour.

Bovell was posted to London as Agent-General for Western Australia in 1971. He served in this role until 1974.

== Later life and death ==
After returning from London, Bovell retired to Busselton. He died in September 1999 at the age of 92.

== Honours and legacy ==
Bovell was made a knight bachelor in 1976 for services to Western Australia. He received the accolade from Queen Elizabeth in Canberra in 1977. The Sir William Stewart Bovell Sporting Complex in Busselton was named after him.
