= Henry Yelverton (merchant) =

Australian sawmiller and timber merchant

Henry Yelverton (1821 – 1 April 1880) was an Australian sawmiller and timber merchant.

Yelverton was born in London, England; his father, Edward, was a jeweller. He went to the United States aged 18, having originally planned to study medicine, and was employed by a whaling ship that took him to Western Australia in 1845. He worked near Perth, employing sawyers by 1849. In 1853 he was a cooper and had bought a brig with a business partner to transport timber to the eastern colonies. He moved to the Vasse River area near Busselton in 1855. In 1858 he built a steam sawmill at Quindalup that provided timber from jarrah and tuart forests to the eastern colonies, British India, and Ceylon and employed up to 120 ex-convicts. He built a jetty, roads, bridges and a horse tramway for his forestry business, as well as Busselton's first courthouse. His company began the construction of Busselton Jetty in 1864 and 1865. He was also involved in the Castle Bay Whaling Company, was licensee of the Race Horse Inn at Fremantle, and smuggled tobacco for extra income. Customs officials heavily fined him for his tobacco-smuggling activities, but this did not affect his local standing; local consensus was that "he had done much more for the district than the government ever had". In 1865, he had exported almost £11,000 of timber out of the £15,693 worth of the material exported in the entire colony of Western Australia. His financial situation was unstable, however; he was bankrupt in September 1862 and May 1866, and was apparently struggling financially in 1868 and 1872–73. In January 1880 he was seriously injured in a logging accident; he died on 1 April of that year, aged 58.

He married Mary Marshall, the daughter of a clerk, on 7 June 1853 at St George's Anglican Church; the couple had two sons and nine daughters. His son Henry John, who later became a state politician, took over his father's timber business after his death. It was eventually bought out by the Imperial Jarrah Wood Corporation, which was subsequently merged into Millars.

The locality of Yelverton is named after him.
