= William Pickering (Australian politician) =

Australian politician

William George Pickering (20 September 1869 – 15 September 1953) was an Australian politician. He was the Country Party member for Sussex in the Western Australian Legislative Assembly from 1917 to 1924. In 1920, he was the only member of the Legislative Assembly to vote against allowing women to stand for parliament.
