= Henry Yelverton (Australian politician) =

Australian politician

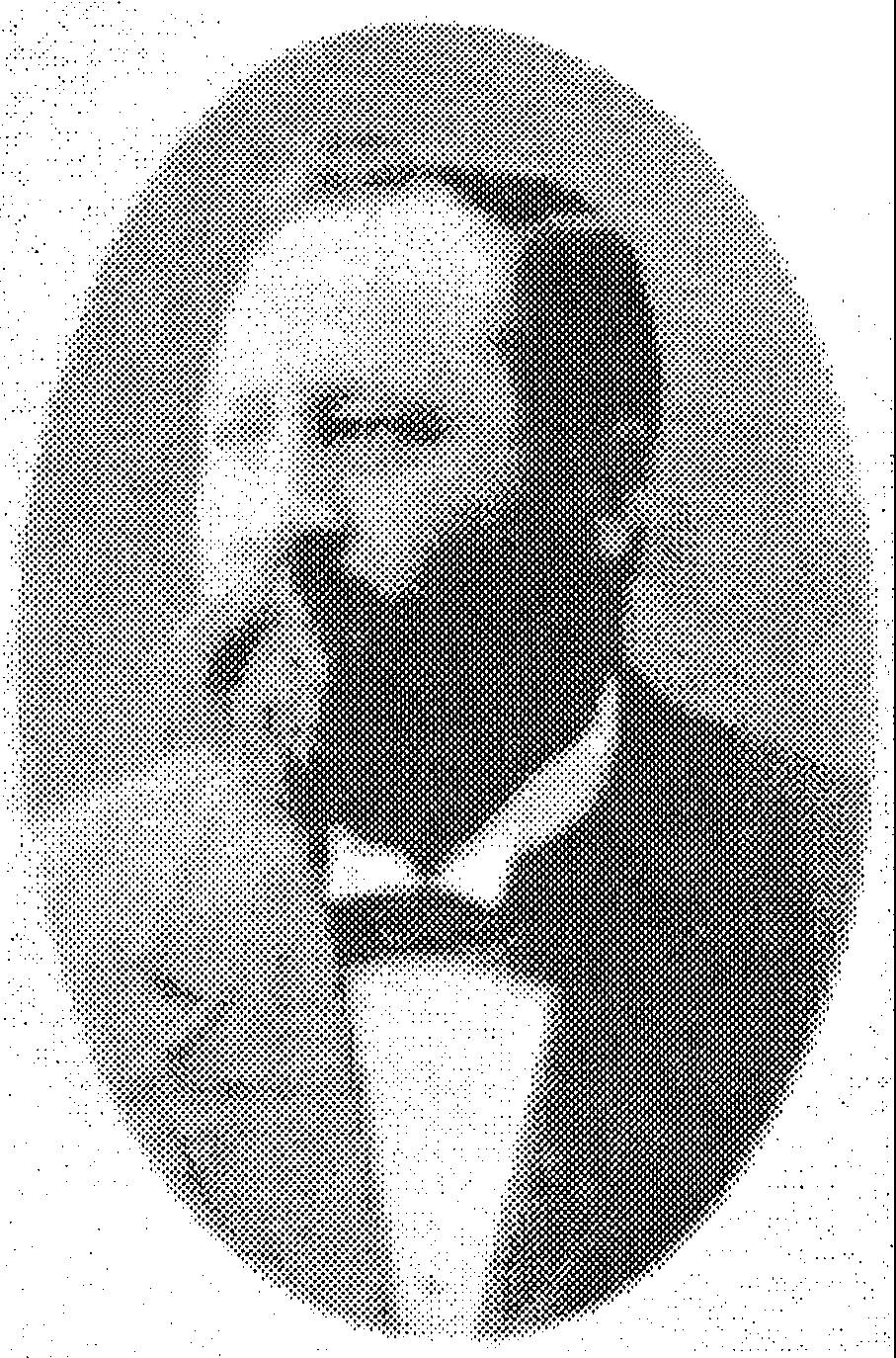
Henry John Yelverton

Henry John Yelverton (6 April 1854 – 14 January 1906) was a Member of the Western Australian Legislative Assembly in the Electoral district of Sussex from 1901 to 1904.

The son of Henry Yelverton, a timber miller, Yelverton was born in Fremantle, Western Australia on 6 April 1854. He was educated at the Christian Brothers College before entering his father's business as a timber contractor in 1872. He later worked as a merchant, farmer and pastoralist. In January 1878, he married Eloise Guerrier; they had four sons and five daughters. When his father died in 1880, Yelverton took over his business. It was eventually bought out by the Imperial Jarrah Wood Corporation, which was subsequently merged into Millars.

Yelverton began to take in interest in public life, and in 1900 became a justice of the peace. On 24 April 1901, he successfully stood for election to the Western Australian Legislative Assembly seat of Sussex. He held the seat until the election of 28 June 1904, which he did not contest.

Henry Yelverton died on 14 January 1906 in the Government Hospital at Bunbury. At the time of his death, he was the mill manager at Dardanup. He is buried at Busselton Cemetery.
