= Group Settlement Scheme =

Former migration scheme in Western Australia

1930s map showing Group Settlement Scheme localities

The Group Settlement Scheme was an assisted migration scheme which operated in Western Australia from the early 1920s. It was engineered by Premier James Mitchell and followed on from the Soldier Settlement Scheme immediately after World War I. Targeting civilians and others who were otherwise ineligible for the Soldiers' scheme, its principal purpose was to provide a labour force to open up the large tracts of potential agricultural land to ultimately reduce dependence on food imports from interstate. It was also seen by Australians as boosting the ideals of the White Australia policy by strengthening the Anglo-Australian cultural identity of Australia. High levels of post-war unemployment in Britain saw the UK Government seizing on the scheme as a way to reduce dole-queues. Over 6,000 people emigrated to Western Australia under the scheme which was funded jointly by the state, federal and UK governments.

Mitchell's plan was for 40-to-65-hectare (100-to-160-acre) land holdings to be cleared and intensively cultivated by the settlers, initially supervised by experienced farmers, to develop a self-sustaining dairy industry. Premier Mitchell was nicknamed "Moo-Cow" from his perceived obsession with the dairy industry. He and his Nationalist and Country Party colleagues considered the 'unlimited land resources for closer settlement' were the key to the state's economic progress.

== History ==
=== Individual family settlements ===
Under an agreement made with the British government, the state would take up to 6,000 men from the UK and settle them on 6,000 farms over a five-year period.

Migrant settlers received financial assistance for their and their families' passage to Australia, and in return were required to work in small communities in undeveloped areas in the State's South West and Wheatbelt regions. After often only one or two days of acclimatisation and processing on arrival, properties were allocated by ballot and the settlers transported to their selections. After a period of establishment, the settlers were required to repay a 30-year loan (not exceeding £A 1,000, equivalent to A$78,600 in 2022) provided by the Agricultural Bank, and at the completion of the loan repayment the settler would have freehold title to the property. They were paid 10 shillings (equivalent to A$39) per day during the land clearing phase and offered a £A 10, equivalent to A$786, loan for the purchase of household and agricultural equipment. The loan was interest-only for the first five years. The communities (or groups) typically comprised between twelve and twenty families. They cleared land, built fences and established their farms in areas which had previously been unable to attract settlers.

The promises made to applicants were often unrealistic and sometimes grossly misleading, and caused many to resign and walk off the properties soon after arrival and realisation of the task before them. For those that did persevere, communities endured considerable hardships and deprivation. Inadequate resources were provided, and the settlers often lacked the necessary farming skills and suitability for rural enterprise. Unsuitable equipment was often supplied for clearing the immense hardwood timber forests. Uneconomic farm sizes and depressed agricultural prices forced consolidations and various changes to the scheme. In some areas, poor land quality also led to failures. The extreme isolation in the virgin forests and lack of infrastructure such as roads and communications made life difficult. By April 1924, 30% of migrants and 42% of Australians had abandoned their allocations. Others stayed as they had no alternative. Sustenance payments were made to support many families.

=== Group settlements ===
The term "Group Settlement" was believed to have come from a suggestion made by a British soldier-settler John Wozencroft who had been assigned a 34.4-hectare (85-acre) allotment near Lefroy Brook at Pemberton. After selecting his property from a plan in Perth with advice from the Lands Department, Wozencroft travelled to Pemberton only to discover it to be impossibly isolated and that the heavily timbered property could only be cleared with the assistance of a small team of men. He wrote a letter directly to Premier Mitchell saying that he and his government "should be had up for misrepresentation". Mitchell reacted quickly, possibly fearing a public relations issue, and despatched Barbe More, a Lands Inspector at Bunbury. More interviewed Wozencroft in November 1920 who relayed his suggestion that future allotments be made to four of five settlers in a group, and that an expert adviser be initially assigned to each group to assist and advise.

The first group settlement was at Manjimup in 1921 and comprised eighteen blocks. Other settlements were established in Northcliffe, Denmark, Nornalup, Walpole, and Bridgetown. A programme of draining the vast floodplains above the Peel-Harvey Estuary was instigated during the same period. This freed up potential farmland in the Peel Estate which was subdivided and allocated to many of the groups. The sandy soils were found to be of poor quality however, and mostly unsuited for cattle grazing or pastures. The urbanised Perth suburbs of Baldivis and Bertram were part of this area. Samuel Bateman's estate in the Byford area was also similarly subdivided.

In 1924-25 the government established a Royal Commission on Group Settlement. The commission's final report was published on 9 June 1925 and included:

The new method of land settlement was put into effect in March 1921, when Group 1 was started on its way to Manjimup. This group in common with the first 40 inaugurated between this date and December 1922 was made up mainly of colonials or migrants of some years standing, but from then onwards the groups became composed almost entirely of migrants.

At that time there were 127 groups in operation throughout the South-West. Establishment of new groups was abandoned briefly but later resumed with more settlements at Northcliffe, Busselton and Manjimup.

Mitchell's successor Philip Collier supported and continued the scheme through most of his Premiership from 1924 to 1930. With the 1930s Depression and the collapse of dairy produce prices, ever more settlers walked off their properties. Politicians called for its scrapping due to the drain of the state's resources with the high failure rate. The last settlement established was at Northcliffe in May 1928. In 1930, government support was finally withdrawn and management responsibility for the remaining settlements passed to the Agricultural Bank.

== Legacy ==
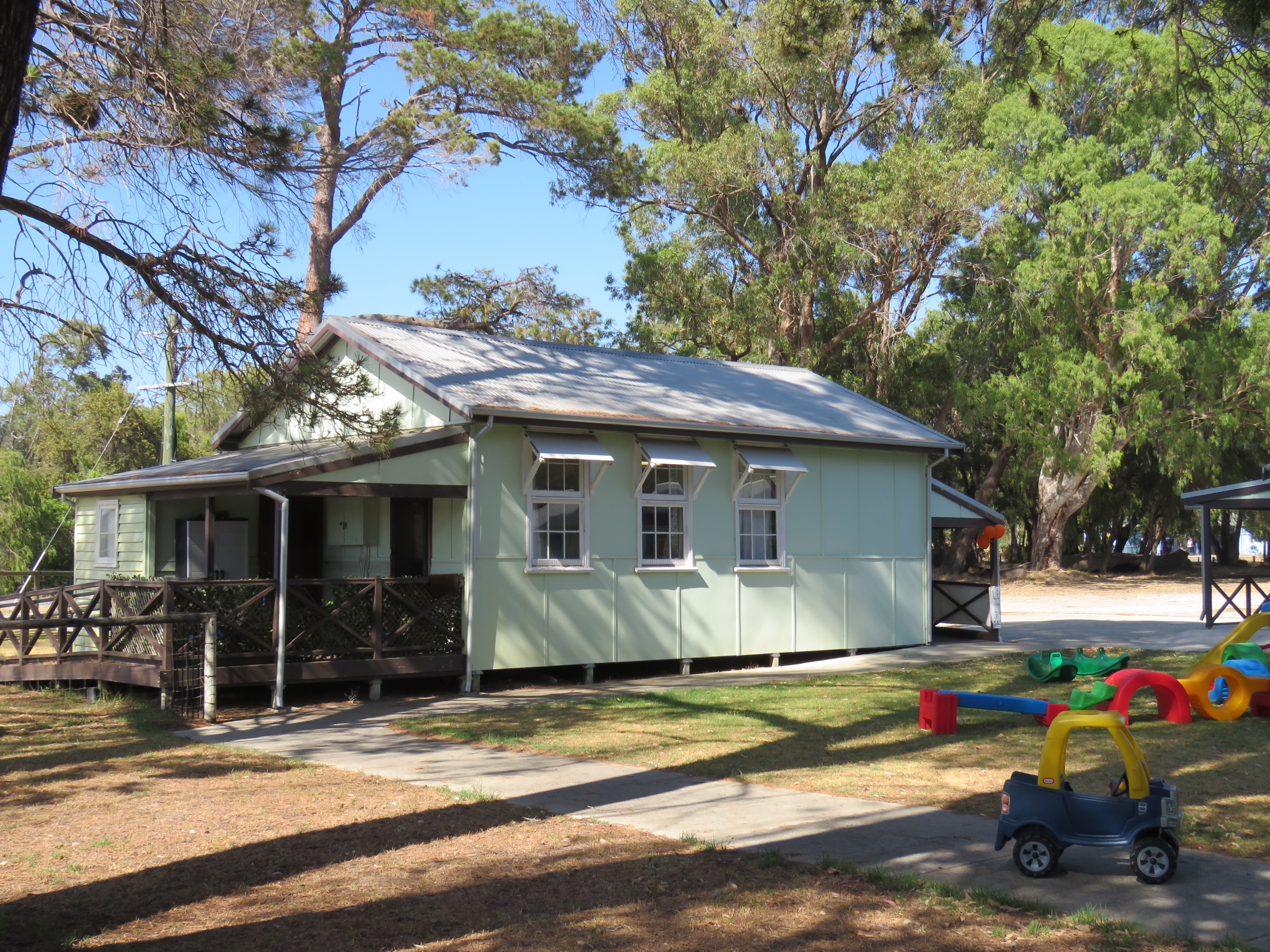
The former Baldivis Primary School, originally known as the Group 50–54 School, opened in 1924 and operated until 1978

The policy helped establish a dairy industry which flourishes today, and many successful farms were cleared by the group workers. It also saw the expansion and establishment of a number of townships, schools and rail links. Over 40,000 hectares (100,000 acres) of land was cleared by the scheme which had cost the state £A 3 million, equivalent to A$300 million in 2022.

After World War II, many of the abandoned Group Settlement farms were taken over by immigrants under a new Soldier Settlement Scheme, the next assisted migration scheme.

British newspaper magnate Alfred Harmsworth, 1st Viscount Northcliffe, actively promoted the scheme in its early years through his UK newspapers, especially The Times. The town of Northcliffe was established through the scheme and named to recognise his role.

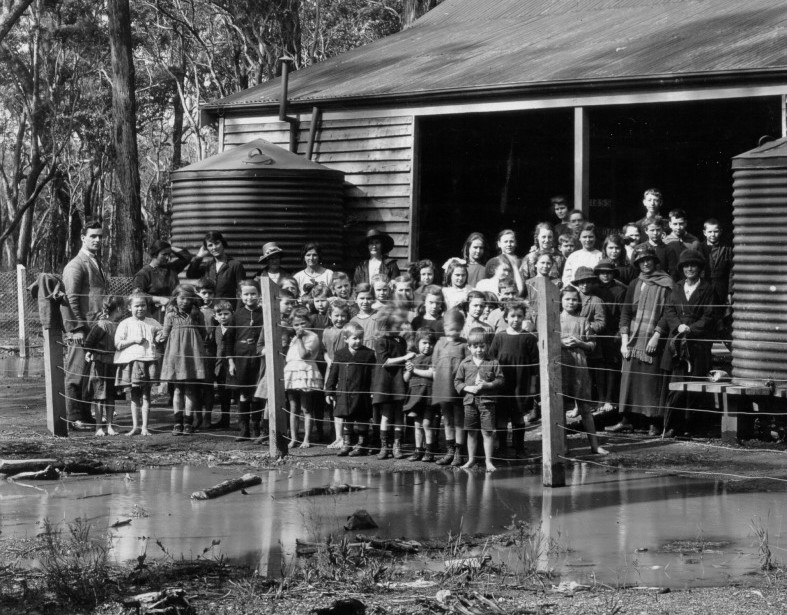
John Tonkin (left) at Nuralingup school in the 1920s

John Tonkin worked as a teacher at a two-teacher school at the group settlement of Nuralingup (near Augusta) for several years from 1923. He later taught at another group settlement at Margaret River. Tonkin became Labor state premier from 1971 to 1974. He is the only former teacher to have reached the office of premier of the state.

The program was succeeded by a Group Migration Scheme operated out of London by the Western Australian Government, co-ordinated by Digby Blight from 1959 to 1962.

== List of group settlements ==
List of groups
Group number	Local identification	Postal address	District office
1	Mitcheldean	Manjimup	Manjimup
2	Springdale	Pemberton	Manjimup
3	Kudardup	near Augusta	Busselton
4	Kudardup	near Augusta	Busselton
5	Graphite Road	Manjimup	Manjimup
6	Nuralingup	(renamed) Forrest Grove	Busselton
7	Nuralingup	(renamed) Forrest Grove	Busselton
8	Eastbrook	Pemberton	Manjimup
9	Eastbrook	Pemberton	Manjimup
10	Glenoran	Manjimup	Manjimup
11	Boojetup	Pemberton	Manjimup
12	Cowaramup	Cowaramup	Busselton
13	Cowaramup	Cowaramup	Busselton
14	Tutunup Siding	Busselton (Abba River area)	Busselton
15	Hithergreen	Busselton (Abba River area)	Busselton
16	Abba River Siding	Busselton (renamed Ruabon)	Busselton
17	Bramley Siding	near Cowaramup	Busselton
18	Wirring	near Cowaramup	Busselton
19	Lanark	Manjimup	Manjimup
20	Willyabrup	Busselton (Abba River area)	Busselton
21	Middlesex	Jardee	Manjimup
22	Rosa Brook	Margaret River	Busselton
23	Yanmah	Manjimup	Manjimup
24	Karridale	East Karridale	Busselton
25	Karri Hills	Jardee	Manjimup
26	Barronhurst	Pemberton	Manjimup
27	Kalgup	Busselton	Busselton
28	Acton Park	Busselton	Busselton
29	Oakford	Peel Estate	Wellard
30	Oakford	Peel Estate	Wellard
31	Middlesex	Jardee	Manjimup
32	Ruabon	Busselton	Busselton
33	Byford	Peel Estate	Wellard
34	Yoongarillup	Wonnerup	Busselton
35	Mundijong	Peel Estate	Wellard
36	Sabina River	Busselton	Busselton
37	Cornvale	Peel Estate	Wellard
38	McLeods Creek	Karridale area	Busselton
39	Cornvale	Peel Estate	Wellard
40	Chapman's Hill	Busselton	Busselton
41	Carmarthen	Denmark	Denmark
42	Carmarthen	Denmark	Denmark
43	Serpentine	Peel Estate	Wellard
44	Ambergate	Busselton (Abba River)	Busselton
45	Serpentine	Peel Estate	Wellard
46	Serpentine	Peel Estate	Wellard
47	Serpentine	Peel Estate	Wellard
48	Blythe Park	Busselton (Abba River)	Busselton
49	Lilyvale	Busselton – Ambergate area	Busselton
50	11 Mile Camp	Peel Estate	Wellard
51	Ellensbrook	Margaret River	Busselton
52	Lennox	Busselton	Busselton
53	Carbunup	Busselton	Busselton
54	11 Mile Camp	Peel Estate	Wellard
55	Jarrahbank	Peel Estate	Wellard
56	Biswae	Peel Estate	Wellard
57	Witchcliffe	Margaret River	Busselton
58	Harewood	Scotsdale Road	Denmark
59	Boallia	Busselton – Vasse	Busselton
60	Boyndlie Park (now Metricup)	Busselton	Busselton
61	Yelverton	Busselton (near Metricup)	Busselton
62	Great Hope Valley	near Cowaramup	Busselton
63	Rapid Landing	Margaret River (east side	Busselton
64	Arumvale	Margaret River (west side	Busselton
65	Diamond Tree	Pemberton	Manjimup
66	Baldivis	Peel Estate	Wellard
67	Karnup	Peel Estate	Wellard
68	Karnup	Peel Estate	Wellard
69	Sheoak	Karridale (near Alexandra Bridge)	Busselton
70	Stake Hill	Peel Estate	Wellard
71	13 Mile	Peel Estate	Wellard
72	Walgine	Margaret River	Busselton
73	Woolstone		Busselton
74	Gnarabup	Karridale (near Alexandra Bridge)	Busselton
75	Warner Glen	Karridale (near Alexandra Bridge)	Busselton
76	Nillup	Karridale (near Alexandra Bridge)	Busselton
77	Rosa Brook	Margaret River	Busselton
78	Courtenay	Margaret River	Busselton
79	Linfarn	Manjimup	Manjimup
80	Walyancup	Peel Estate	Wellard
81	Folly	13 Mile Estate	Wellard
82	Maramanup	Peel Estate	Wellard
83	Manjimup	Appadene	Manjimup
84	Airedale	Margaret River	Busselton
85	Osmington	Margaret River	Busselton
86	Rosa Glen	Margaret River	Busselton
87	Blake Snake	Busselton	Busselton
88	Rosa Glen	Margaret River	Busselton
89	Channybearup Road	Pemberton	Manjimup
90	Channybearup Road	Pemberton	Manjimup
91	Byford	Byford (Peel Estate)	Wellard
92	Hells Hole (Scotsdale Road)	Denmark	Denmark
93	Six Mile (Nornalup Road)	Denmark	Denmark
94	Northcliffe	Northcliffe	Manjimup
95	Northcliffe	Northcliffe	Manjimup
96	Northcliffe	Northcliffe	Manjimup
97	Northcliffe	Northcliffe	Manjimup
98	Northcliffe	Northcliffe	Manjimup
99	Northcliffe	Northcliffe	Manjimup
100	Northcliffe	Northcliffe	Manjimup
101	East Denmark (Lindsay Road). ...	Denmark	Denmark
102	Hells Hole (adjoins Group 92)	Denmark	Denmark
103	Northcliffe	Northcliffe	Manjimup
104	Northcliffe	Northcliffe	Manjimup
105	Kentdale	Denmark	Denmark
106	Northcliffe	Northcliffe	Manjimup
107	Northcliffe	Northcliffe	Manjimup
108	Northcliffe	Northcliffe	Manjimup
109	Northcliffe	Northcliffe	Manjimup
110	Kentdale	Denmark	Denmark
111	Harewood Road	Denmark	Denmark
112	Wellard	Peel Estate	Wellard
113	Parryville	Denmark (South West Highway)	Denmark
114	Scotsdale Road	Denmark (adjoins Group 58)	Denmark
115	Northcliffe	Northcliffe	Manjimup
116	Marks Siding	Nornalup	Denmark
117	Northcliffe	Northcliffe	Manjimup
118	Northcliffe	Northcliffe	Manjimup
119	Quininup	Jardee	Manjimup
120	Quininup	Jardee	Manjimup
121	Northcliffe	Northcliffe	Manjimup
122	Treeton	Great Hope Valley	Busselton
123	Northcliffe	Northcliffe	Manjimup
124	Chapman's Hill	Busselton	Busselton
125	Maramanup	Peel Estate	Wellard
126	Hester	Catterick	Manjimup
127	Hester	Catterick	Manjimup
128	Northcliffe	Northcliffe	Manjimup
129	Northcliffe	Northcliffe	Manjimup
130	Northcliffe	Northcliffe	Manjimup
131	Greenbushes	Greenbushes	Manjimup
132	Greenbushes	Greenbushes	Manjimup
133	Northcliffe	Northcliffe	Manjimup
134	Quininup	Jardee	Manjimup
135	Quininup	Jardee	Manjimup
136	Kaloorup (Sussex)	Busselton (near Jindong)	Busselton
137	Rosa Brook	Margaret River	Busselton
138	Hazelvale	Denmark	Denmark
139	Hazelvale	Denmark	Denmark
140	Peel Estate	Peel Estate	Wellard
141	Northcliffe	Northcliffe	Manjimup
142	Northcliffe	Northcliffe	Manjimup
143	Northcliffe	Northcliffe	Manjimup
144	Marybrook	Busselton	Busselton
145	Quininup	Jardee	Manjimup
146	Capeldene	via Kirup	Manjimup
147	Shannon	Northcliffe	Manjimup
148	Smiths Brook	Manjimup	Manjimup
149	Channybearup Road	Pemberton	Manjimup
150	Northcliffe	Northcliffe	Manjimup

== See also ==
- Immigration to Australia
- Baldivis tramway
- Peel Main Drain

== Sources ==
- Gabbedy, J.P. (1988). Group Settlement – Part 1, Its Origins (volume 1). University of Western Australia Press. ISBN 0-85564-284-X.
- Stannage, Charles Thomas, ed. (1 December 1981). A New History of Western Australia. Nedlands: UWA Publishing. ISBN 0-85564-181-9. LCCN 82101009. OCLC 963830667. OL 3517729M. Wikidata Q125995168.
- Gregory, Jenny; Gothard, Janice, eds. (2009). Historical Encyclopedia of Western Australia (PDF). Crawley: UWA Publishing. ISBN 978-1-921401-15-2. OCLC 405500003. OL 45266821M. Wikidata Q5773872.
