= North Jindong, Western Australia =

Locality in the City of Busselton, Western Australia

North Jindong
- Suburb
- Coordinates: 33.73°S 115.17°E
- Country: Australia
- State: Western Australia
- LGA: City of Busselton
- Location: 240 km (150 mi) from Perth; 21 km (13 mi) from Busselton

Government
  - State electorate: Vasse
  - Federal division: Forrest

Area
  - Total: 19.1 km^{2} (7.4 sq mi)

Population
  - Total: 75 (SAL 2021)
- Postcode: 6280
Suburbs around North Jindong
Carbunup River	Carbunup River	Jindong
Yelverton	North Jindong	Jindong
Yelverton	Metricup	Kaloorup

North Jindong is a rural locality of the City of Busselton in the South West region of Western Australia. The western border of the locality runs along the Bussell Highway.

The City of Busselton and the locality of North Jindong are located on the traditional land of the Wardandi (also spelled Wadandi) people of the Noongar nation.
