= Perimeter Road =

Road in South West region of Western Australia

Perimeter Road Western Australia

General information
- Type: Highway
- Location: Margaret River
- Length: 7 km (4.3 mi)
- Opened: 2018
- Route number(s): State Route 10

Major junctions
- North end: Bussell Highway (State Route 10)
- John Archibald Drive; Rosa Brook Road; Darch Road; Airport Access Road
- South end: Bussell Highway (State Route 10)

Highway system
- Highways in Australia; National Highway • Freeways in Australia; Highways in Western Australia

The Perimeter Road, also known as the Margaret River Perimeter Road, is a highway bypass of Margaret River, Western Australia. The seven-kilometre-long (4.3 mi) road deviates Bussell Highway traffic, including heavy vehicles, to the east of the town, and connects to a new airport access road. It is planned to eventually be a dual carriageway, but has initially been constructed as a single carriageway, in two stages. Construction of stage one, from south of Margaret River to Rosa Brook Road, began in December 2014 and was completed in May 2015. Construction of stage two – the remaining northern section – began in September 2017 and was completed in February 2019, with an opening in December 2018. An extension of John Archibald Drive and the redevelopment of Bussell Highway in the town were included in the business case for constructing stage two.

Stage two of the project received $60 million of funding from The Nationals Western Australia to enable a complete bypass to be constructed, rather than a "road to nowhere". The state government provided the $13 million to construct stage one. The total cost was $47.6 million.

The project underwent an Environmental Impact Assessment and Aboriginal Heritage survey. Action was taken to compensate for the loss of native vegetation, and a zoologist was employed to identify and relocate native fauna at the start of stage one construction.

The perimeter road has been designed to reduce congestion, improve safety for the many pedestrians, including tourists, who use the road, and provide heavy vehicles with a lesser gradient to ascend or descend.

== Major intersections ==
| LGA | Location | km | mi | Destinations | Notes |
|---|---|---|---|---|---|
| Augusta-Margaret River | Bramley | 0.0 | 0.0 | Bussell Highway (State Route 10 north) – Cowaramup, Busselton, Bunbury | Northern terminus at roundabout, Bussell northbound and Bussell south to Perimeter east free-flowing . State Route 10 concurrency terminus |
| Augusta-Margaret River | Bramley | 0.9 | 0.56 | Airstrip Access Road | Access to Margaret River Airport |
| Margaret River | | 2.4– 2.6 | 1.5– 1.6 | Margaret River Bridge | |
| Augusta-Margaret River | Margaret River | 3.9 | 2.4 | John Archibald Drive – Margaret River, Prevelly, Gnarabup | Roundabout |
| Augusta-Margaret River | Margaret River | 5.4 | 3.4 | Rosa Brook Road – Rosa Brook, Rosa Glen, Nannup | |
| Augusta-Margaret River | Margaret River | 7.2 | 4.5 | Bussell Highway (State Route 10 south) – Witchcliffe, Augusta | Southern terminus at roundabout, Perimeter west to Bussell south free-flowing. State Route 10 concurrency terminus |
1.000 mi = 1.609 km; 1.000 km = 0.621 mi: Route transition; Note: Intersections with minor local roads are not shown
