= Warner Glen, Western Australia =

Locality in the Shire of Augusta–Margaret River, Western Australia

Warner Glen
- Suburb
- Interactive map of Warner Glen
- Coordinates: 34.13°S 115.21°E
- Country: Australia
- State: Western Australia
- LGA: Shire of Augusta–Margaret River
- Location: 295 km (183 mi) from Perth; 30 km (19 mi) from Margaret River

Government
  - State electorate: Vasse
  - Federal division: Forrest

Area
  - Total: 28.3 km^{2} (10.9 sq mi)

Population
  - Total: 63 (SAL 2021)
- Postcode: 6288
Suburbs around Warner Glen
Metricup	Boallia & Kaloorup	Chapman Hill
Cowaramup	Warner Glen	Baudin
Osmington	Osmington	Baudin

Warner Glen is a rural locality of the Shire of Augusta–Margaret River in the South West region of Western Australia. The northern and western borders of the locality are formed by the Blackwood River.

The majority of Warner Glen is located on the traditional land of the Wardandi people, while the eastern part of the locality is the land of the Bibulman (also spelled Pibelmen) people, both of the Noongar nation.
