= Hithergreen, Western Australia =

Locality in the City of Busselton, Western Australia

Hithergreen
- Suburb
- Interactive map of Hithergreen
- Coordinates: 33.72°S 115.50°E
- Country: Australia
- State: Western Australia
- LGA: City of Busselton
- Location: 218 km (135 mi) from Perth; 19 km (12 mi) from Busselton

Government
  - State electorate: Vasse
  - Federal division: Forrest

Area
  - Total: 24.2 km^{2} (9.3 sq mi)

Population
  - Total: 61 (SAL 2016)
- Postcode: 6280
Suburbs around Hithergreen
Abba River	Abba River	Tutunup
Yoongarillup	Hithergreen	Yoganup
Sabina River	Yoganup	Yoganup

Hithergreen is a rural locality of the City of Busselton in the South West region of Western Australia, located on the Vasse Highway.

The City of Busselton and the locality of Hithergreen are located on the traditional land of the Wardandi (also spelled Wadandi) people, of the Noongar nation.

Hithergreen was established as a Group Settlement with the group number 15 in May 1922.
