= Ombak tujuh =

Ombak Tujuh (meaning "Seven Waves") is a "big-wave" spot. It is more closely related to Western Australia's Margaret River than other machine-like Indonesian waves. It's left-hand reef with a feathering, shifting, barreling take-off and a long reeling wall. It's considered to be the best wave along the Ujung Genteng peninsula, primarily because it's a wave magnet. Local geography cycles predominant winds around to blow offshore, too. But the wave's raw exposure to several swell directions makes for shifty conditions. Bigger boards are recommended just to ease yourself into these things. One of the most difficult aspects of the wave is reaching it, either by boat or by a long and winding road.
