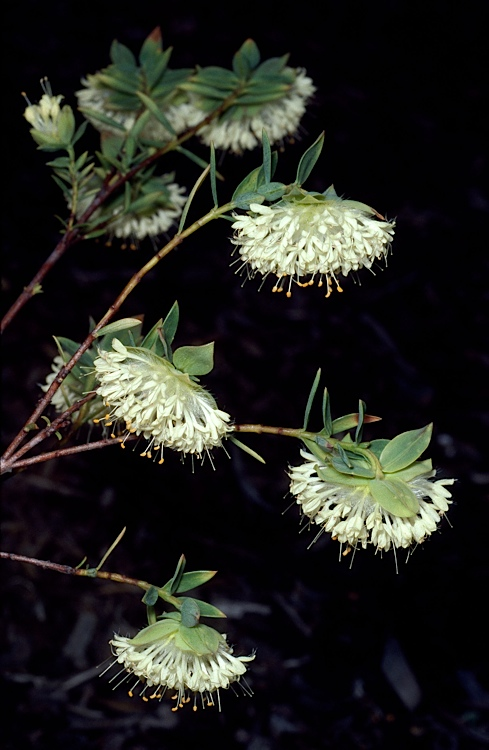
- Subspecies lehmanniana in the Australian National Botanic Gardens

Scientific classification
- Kingdom: Plantae
- Clade: Tracheophytes
- Clade: Angiosperms
- Clade: Eudicots
- Clade: Rosids
- Order: Malvales
- Family: Thymelaeaceae
- Genus: Pimelea
- Species: P. lehmanniana

Binomial name
- Pimelea lehmanniana Meisn.

Synonyms
- Banksia lehmanniana (Meisn.) Kuntze nom. illeg., nom. superfl.; Calyptrostegia lehmanniana (Meisn.) Endl.

= Pimelea lehmanniana =

Species of shrub

Pimelea lehmanniana is a species of flowering plant in the family Thymelaeaceae and is endemic to the southwest of Western Australia. It is a shrub with narrowly egg-shaped leaves and clusters of white to pale yellow flowers surrounded by 4 or 6, pale yellowish-green involucral bracts.

== Description ==
Pimelea lehmanniana is an erect shrub that typically grows to a height of 0.3–1.2 m (1 ft 0 in – 3 ft 11 in) and has a single stem at ground level. The leaves are narrowly egg-shaped, sometimes with the narrower end towards the base, 4–34 mm (0.16–1.34 in) long and 1–7 mm (0.039–0.276 in) wide on a petiole 0.5–1.3 mm (0.020–0.051 in) long. The flowers are white to pale yellow and arranged in clusters on a peduncle 2–17 mm (0.079–0.669 in) long. There are 4 or 6 pale yellowish green, sometimes reddish, egg-shaped to broadly egg-shaped involucral bracts 13–21 mm (0.51–0.83 in) long and 7–14 mm (0.28–0.55 in) wide around the flower clusters, each flower on a hairy pedicel 1–2 mm (0.039–0.079 in) long. The floral tube is 8–14 mm (0.31–0.55 in) long, the sepals 3–5.5 mm (0.12–0.22 in) long, and the stamens are much longer than the sepals. Flowering occurs from August to November.

== Taxonomy ==
Pimelea lehmanniana was first formally described in 1845 by Carl Meissner in 1845 in Lehmann's Plantae Preissianae. The specific epithet (lehmanniana) honours Johann Georg Christian Lehmann.

In 1988, Barbara Lynette Rye described two subspecies of P. lehmanniana in the journal Nuytsia, and the names are accepted by the Australian Plant Census:

- Pimelea lehmanniana Meisn. subsp. lehmanniana has a circumscissile floral tube, the ovary-part hairy.
- Pimelea lehmanniana subsp. nervosa (Meisn.) Rye has a floral tube that is not circumscissile, and the ovary-part of the floral tube is glabrous.

== Distribution and habitat ==
Subspecies lehmanniana grows on rocky hillsides or ridges from Lake Muir to East Mount Barren in the Avon Wheatbelt, Esperance Plains, Jarrah Forest and Mallee bioregions of south-western Western Australia, and subsp. nervosa grows in jarrah and marri woodland on the Darling Range and nearby hilly areas between Gooseberry Hill, Yelverton, Walpole and Mount Barker in separate parts of the Jarrah Forest and Swan Coastal Plain bioregions.

== Conservation status ==
Both subspecies of P. lehmanniana are listed as "not threatened" by the Government of Western Australia Department of Biodiversity, Conservation and Attractions.
