= Yelverton National Park =

National park in Western Australia

- IUCN category II (national park)
- Interactive map of Yelverton National Park
- Location: Yelverton, Western Australia, Australia
- Nearest town: Margaret River
- Coordinates: 33.74°S 115.08°E
- Area: 729 hectares (1,800 acres)
- Established: 2004

Yelverton National Park is a national park in the South West region of Western Australia, 252 kilometres (157 mi) south of Perth. It is located in the local government area of the City of Busselton in the locality of Yelverton, 30 kilometres (19 mi) from Busselton and 20 kilometres (12 mi) from Margaret River, on the Bussell Highway.

The creation of this park out of two reserves, namely a 725-hectare (1,790-acre) former timber reserve and a 4-hectare (10-acre) crown reserve for water was proposed under the Regional Forest Agreement for the South-West Forest in May 1999 and implemented under the Forrest Management Plan (2004–2013). In 2004, the area was declared a national park. It was protected due to its high concentration of rare and priority species and its diverse range of vegetation types. There are no visitor facilities in the park.
