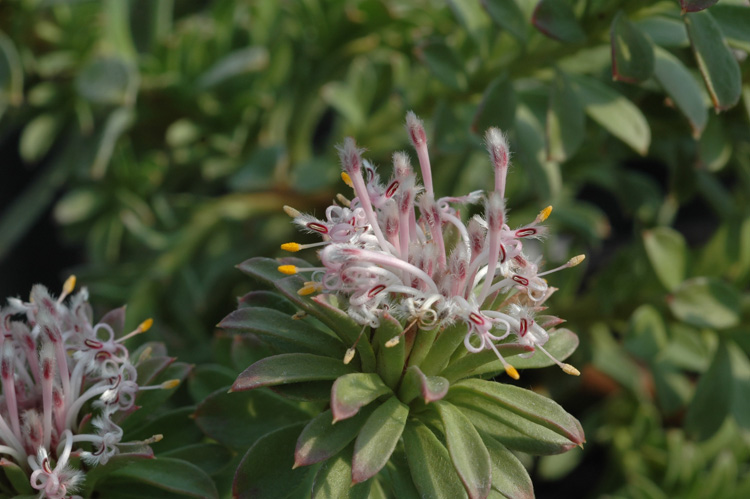
- In the Australian National Botanic Gardens

Scientific classification
- Kingdom: Plantae
- Clade: Tracheophytes
- Clade: Angiosperms
- Clade: Eudicots
- Order: Proteales
- Family: Proteaceae
- Genus: Isopogon
- Species: I. spathulatus

Binomial name
- Isopogon spathulatus R.Br.
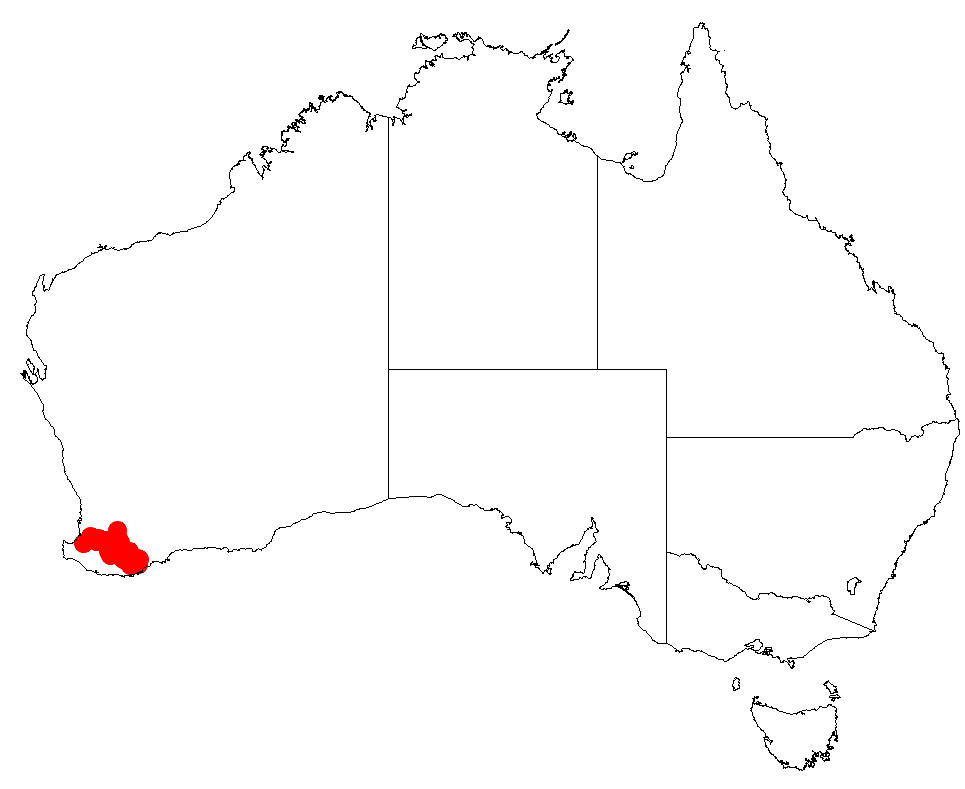
- Occurrence data from Australasian Virtual Herbarium

Synonyms
- Isopogon buxifolius var. linearis (R.Br.) Benth.; Isopogon buxifolius var. spathulatus Benth.; Isopogon spathulatus var. linearis R.Br.; Isopogon spathulatus R.Br. var. spathulatus

= Isopogon spathulatus =

Species of shrub endemic to Western Australia

Isopogon spathulatus is a species of flowering plant in the family Proteaceae and is endemic to south-western Western Australia. It is a shrub with linear to egg-shaped leaves with the narrower end towards the base, and more or less spherical heads of hairy pink flowers.

== Description ==
Isopogon spathulatus is a shrub that typically grows to a height of 0.7–2 m (2 ft 4 in – 6 ft 7 in) and has hairy young branchlets. The leaves are linear to egg-shaped with the narrower end towards the base, 10–23 mm (0.39–0.91 in) long 1.5–7 mm (0.059–0.276 in) wide with a small point on the end. The flowers are arranged on the ends of branchlets in sessile, spherical heads 15–25 mm (0.59–0.98 in) in diameter with hairy, egg-shaped involucral bracts at the base. The flowers are pink, hairy, 14–20 mm (0.55–0.79 in) long and are present in most months followed by fruit that is a hairy nut, fused in a spherical head 15–20 mm (0.59–0.79 in) in diameter.

== Taxonomy ==
The species was first formally described in 1830 by Robert Brown in the Supplementum to his Prodromus Florae Novae Hollandiae et Insulae Van Diemen, based on material collected by William Baxter at King George's Sound.

In 1870, George Bentham reduced I. spathulatus to a variety of Isopogon buxifolius in Flora of Australia, but in 2015, Hislop and Rye reinstated I. spathulatus in the journal Nuytsia.

The specific epithet (spathulatus) means "spoon-shaped".

== Distribution and habitat ==
This isopogon grows in heath or shrubland in swampy or winter-wet areas between Ruabon, Collie and the Stirling Range in the south-west of Western Australia.

== Conservation status ==
Isopogon spathulatus is classified as "not threatened" by the Western Australian Government Department of Parks and Wildlife.
