= Marybrook, Western Australia =

Locality in the City of Busselton, Western Australia

Marybrook
- Suburb
- Coordinates: 33.66°S 115.20°E
- Country: Australia
- State: Western Australia
- LGA(s): City of Busselton
- Location: 238 km (148 mi) from Perth; 16 km (9.9 mi) from Busselton

Government
  - State electorate(s): Vasse
  - Federal division(s): Forrest

Area
  - Total: 15.4 km^{2} (5.9 sq mi)

Population
  - Total(s): 229 (SAL 2021)
- Postcode: 6280
Suburbs around Marybrook
	Geographe Bay	Siesta Park
Anniebrook	Marybrook	Kealy
Carbunup River	Carbunup River	Vasse

Marybrook is a rural locality of the City of Busselton in the South West region of Western Australia, located on Geographe Bay.

The City of Busselton and the locality of Marybrook are located on the traditional land of the Wardandi (also spelled Wadandi) people of the Noongar nation.

Marybrook was established as a Group Settlement with the group number 144.

The locality is home to the heritage-listed Marybrook farmhouse, a cottage dating back to the 1870s. It is thought to have been constructed for John Molloy, who died in 1867.
