= Treeton, Western Australia =

Locality in the Shire of Augusta–Margaret River, Western Australia

Treeton
- Suburb
- Coordinates: 33.86°S 115.23°E
- Country: Australia
- State: Western Australia
- LGA: Shire of Augusta–Margaret River
- Location: 254 km (158 mi) from Perth; 24 km (15 mi) from Margaret River

Government
  - State electorate: Vasse
  - Federal division: Forrest

Area
  - Total: 118.4 km^{2} (45.7 sq mi)

Population
  - Total: 153 (SAL 2021)
- Postcode: 6284
Suburbs around Treeton
| Metricup | Boallia & Kaloorup | Chapman Hill |
| Cowaramup | Treeton | Baudin |
| Osmington | Osmington | Baudin |

Treeton is a rural locality of the Shire of Augusta–Margaret River in the South West region of Western Australia.

Treeton is located on the traditional land of the Wardandi people of the Noongar nation.
