= Anniebrook, Western Australia =

Locality in the City of Busselton, Western Australia

Anniebrook
- Suburb
- Interactive map of Anniebrook
- Coordinates: 33.67°S 115.17°E
- Country: Australia
- State: Western Australia
- LGA: City of Busselton
- Location: 239 km (149 mi) from Perth; 20 km (12 mi) from Busselton

Government
  - State electorate: Vasse
  - Federal division: Forrest

Area
  - Total: 13.1 km^{2} (5.1 sq mi)

Population
  - Total: 53 (SAL 2021)
- Postcode: 6280
Suburbs around Anniebrook
	Geographe Bay
Quindalup	Anniebrook	Marybrook
Carbunup River	Carbunup River	Carbunup River

Anniebrook is a rural locality of the City of Busselton in the South West region of Western Australia, located on Geographe Bay.

The City of Busselton and the locality of Anniebrook are located on the traditional land of the Wardandi (also spelled Wadandi) people of the Noongar nation.
