= Kaloorup, Western Australia =

Locality in the City of Busselton, Western Australia

Kaloorup
- Suburb
- Coordinates: 33.79°S 115.21°E
- Country: Australia
- State: Western Australia
- LGA: City of Busselton
- Location: 247 km (153 mi) from Perth; 28 km (17 mi) from Busselton

Government
  - State electorate: Vasse
  - Federal division: Forrest

Area
  - Total: 45.1 km^{2} (17.4 sq mi)

Population
  - Total: 90 (SAL 2021)
- Postcode: 6280
Suburbs around Kaloorup
Metricup	North Jindong	Jindong
Metricup	Kaloorup	Boallia
Treeton	Treeton	Treeton

Kaloorup is a rural locality of the City of Busselton in the South West region of Western Australia.

The City of Busselton and the locality of Kaloorup are located on the traditional land of the Wardandi (also spelled Wadandi) people of the Noongar nation.

Kaloorup was established as a Group Settlement with the group number 136 in October 1926.
