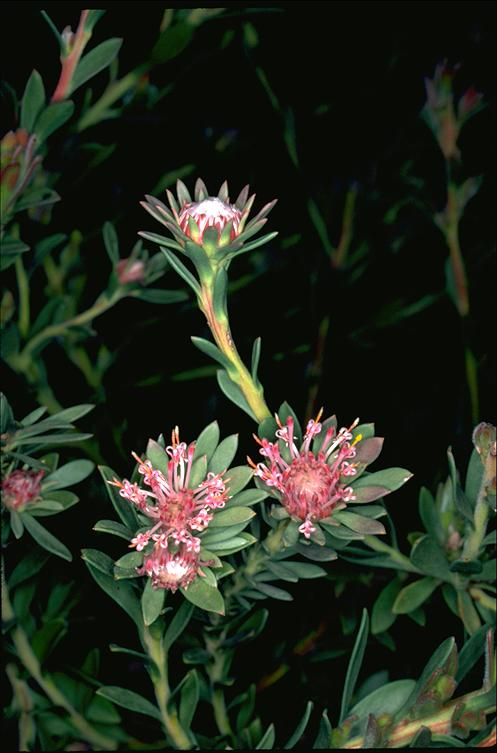
- Subspecies obovatus in the ANBG

Scientific classification
- Kingdom: Plantae
- Clade: Tracheophytes
- Clade: Angiosperms
- Clade: Eudicots
- Order: Proteales
- Family: Proteaceae
- Genus: Isopogon
- Species: I. buxifolius

Binomial name
- Isopogon buxifolius R.Br.
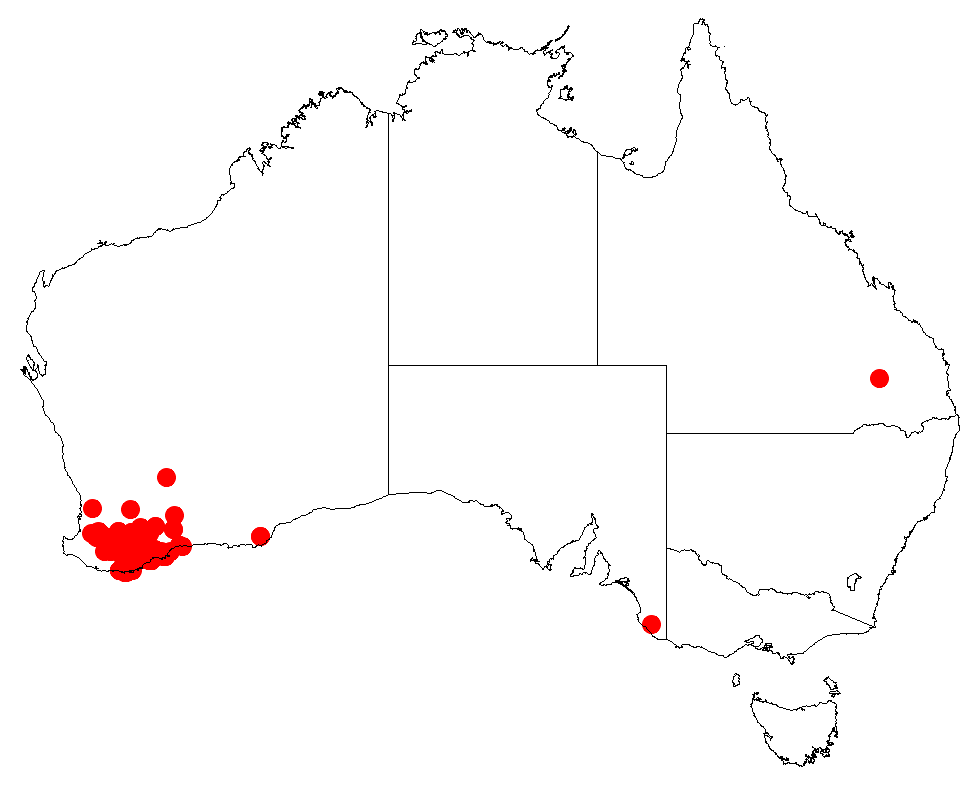
- Occurrence data from Australasian Virtual Herbarium

Synonyms
- Atylus buxifolius (R.Br.) Kuntze; Isopogon buxifolius var. typicus Benth.

= Isopogon buxifolius =

Species of shrub endemic to Western Australia

Isopogon buxifolius is a species of plant in the family Proteaceae and is endemic to the south-west of Western Australia. It is an upright shrub with egg-shaped to elliptic or oblong leaves and clustered spikes of pink flowers.

== Description ==
Isopogon buxifolius is an upright shrub that typically grows to a height of 0.3–1.7 m (1 ft 0 in – 5 ft 7 in) and has mostly hairy reddish to brownish branchlets. The leaves are elliptic, oblong, or egg-shaped with the narrower end towards the base and 8–35 mm (0.31–1.38 in) long with a small point on the tip. The flowers are arranged in more or less sessile spikes up to 20 mm (0.79 in) long and surrounded by leaves. The few involucral bracts are lance-shaped, the flowers 10–15 mm (0.39–0.59 in) long, pink and more or less glabrous. Flowering occurs from June to December and the fruit is an oval, hairy nut, fused with others in a cup-shaped head about 10 mm (0.39 in) long.

== Taxonomy ==
Isopogon buxifolius was first formally described in 1810 by Robert Brown in the Transactions of the Linnean Society of London.

In 1870, George Bentham described four varieties of I. buxifolius in Flora Australiensis and two of his names are accepted by the Australian Plant Census:

- Isopogon buxifolius R.Br. var. buxifolius that has mostly egg-shaped 10–15 mm (0.39–0.59 in) long, flowering mostly from July to December.
- Isopogon buxifolius var. obovatus (R.Br.) Benth. (originally described in 1830 by Robert Brown as Isopogon spathulatus var. obovatus) that has oblong or egg-shaped leaves with the narrower end towards the base, 15–35 mm (0.59–1.38 in) long and 7–14 mm (0.28–0.55 in) wide, flowering mostly from June to October.

Bentham's I. buxifolius var. linearis and var. spathulatus are now regarded as a synonyms of I. spathulatus.

== Distribution and habitat ==
Variety buxifolius grows in swampy areas between Collie, Denmark and Albany and var. obovatus has been recorded in sandy loam over laterite in a small area between the Stirling Range, Cape Riche and Bremer Bay.

== Conservation status ==
Variety buxifolius is classified as "Priority Two" by the Government of Western Australia Department of Parks and Wildlife, meaning that it is poorly known and from only one or a few locations and var. obovatus as "Priority Three", meaning that it is poorly known and known from only a few locations but is not under imminent threat.
