= Forest Grove, Western Australia =

Forest Grove
- Town
- Coordinates: 34°4′21″S 115°6′24″E
- Country: Australia
- State: Western Australia
- LGA: Shire of Augusta-Margaret River

Government
  - State electorate: Warren-Blackwood
  - Federal division: Forrest

Area
  - Total: 127.9 km^{2} (49.4 sq mi)

Population
  - Total: 253 (SAL 2021)
- Postcode: 6286

Forest Grove is a locality in the South West region of Western Australia in the Shire of Augusta-Margaret River.

Forest Grove had a school named Nuralingup, which opened as part of the Group Settlement Scheme in 1923, with future premier John Tonkin as the first head teacher. (Note: It was also known as Group 74 school.) During the 1930s there was an organisation known as the Forest Grove and Districts Agricultural Society. The school was renamed to Forest Grove in 1928 and closed in 1962.
