= Ruabon, Western Australia =

Place in Western Australia

Ruabon
- Town
- Coordinates: 33°39′S 115°29′E
- Country: Australia
- State: Western Australia
- LGA(s): City of Busselton
- Location: 212 km (132 mi) from Perth; 16 km (9.9 mi) from Busselton
- Established: 1925

Government
  - State electorate(s): Vasse
  - Federal division(s): Forrest

Area
  - Total: 31.6 km^{2} (12.2 sq mi)

Population
  - Total(s): 82 (SAL 2021)
- Time zone: UTC+8 (AWST)
- Postcode: 6280

Ruabon is a locality in Western Australia's South West in the local government area of the City of Busselton. At the 2021 census, it had a population of 82.

In 1914 a stopping place called Abba River, named after the nearby river, on the former Nannup branch railway was established in the area of the locality. In 1925 during the Group Settlement Scheme, land near the stopping place was gazetted as a townsite called Abbba River. Both the stopping place and townsite were renamed to Ruabon in 1928 because the local post office was known as Ruabon Post Office and the Abba River Post Office, which now has its own locality, was about 4 kilometres (2.5 mi) away from the railway siding; Welsh group settlers in the area may have influenced its name, which it shares with the small Welsh town of Ruabon. There was a school in the area from 1923 to 1941. The area contains a branch of the Country Women's Association of Western Australia. The Ruabon Townsite Nature Reserve and the Ruabon–Tutunup Rail Reserve (shared with nearby Tutunup) are in the locality.
