= Margaret River Airport =

Airport in Western Australia

- IATA: MQZ; ICAO: YMGT

Summary
- Airport type: Public
- Operator: Shire of Augusta-Margaret River
- Location: Bramley, Western Australia
- Elevation AMSL: 374 ft / 114 m
- Coordinates: 33°55′48″S 115°06′00″E

Map
- Location in Western Australia

Runways
Direction	Length		Surface
Direction	m	ft	Surface
02/20	1,103	3,619	Asphalt
- Sources: Australian AIP and aerodrome chart

Margaret River Airport (IATA: MQZ, ICAO: YMGT) is located in Bramley near Margaret River, Western Australia. It was established in 1981 and sealed in 1999.

The airport is used by the Royal Flying Doctor Service and private charter flights. Largely government-subsidised flights from Perth to this airport via Busselton, which were operated by Maroomba Airlines and Skippers Aviation, operated from 1999 until 2001.

Access is via Bussell Highway and Perimeter Road via Airport Access Road.

== See also ==
- List of airports in Western Australia
- Aviation transport in Australia
