= John Tonkin =

Australian politician (1902–1995)

The Honourable John Tonkin AC
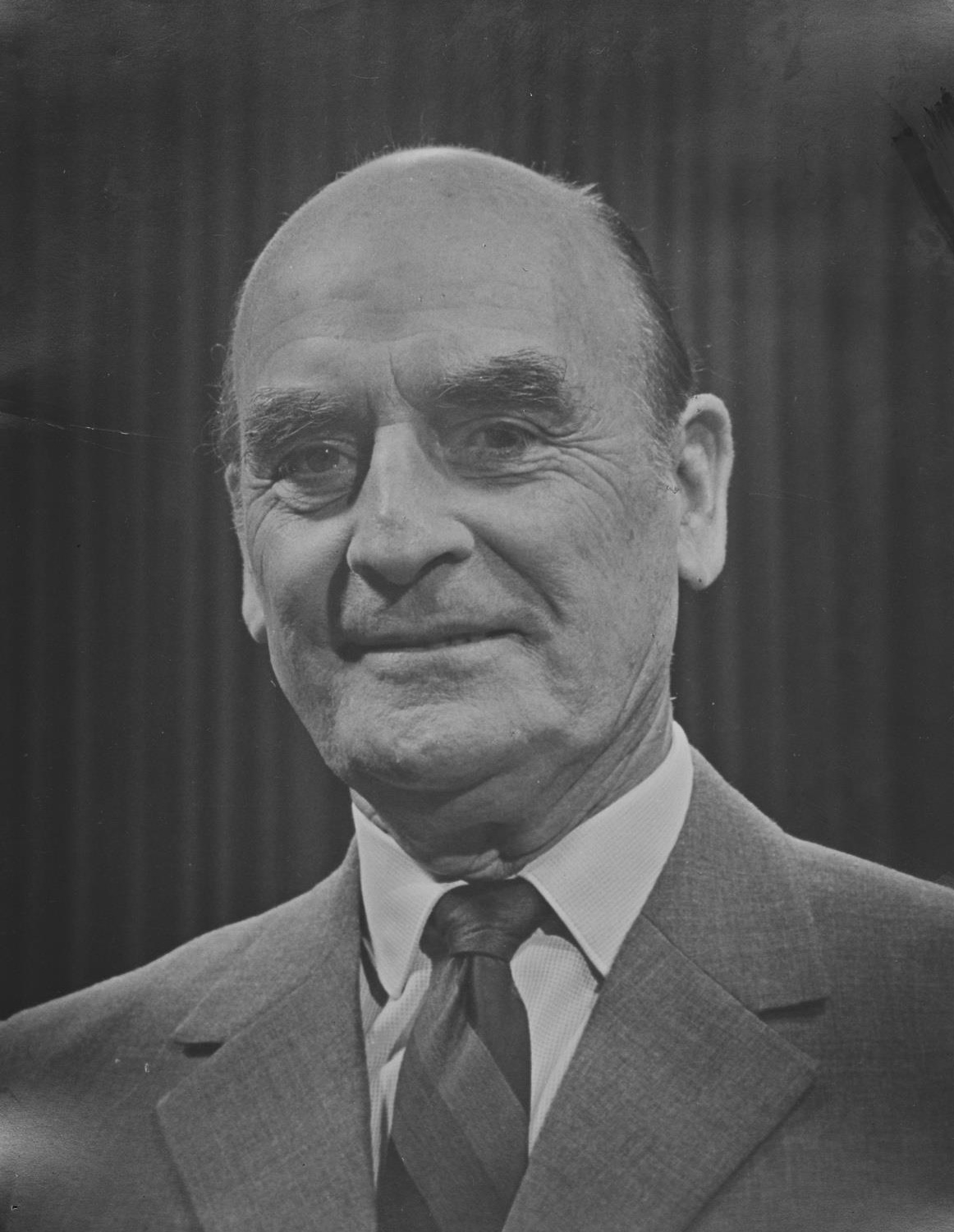
- Tonkin in 1971

20th Premier of Western Australia
- In office 3 March 1971 – 8 April 1974
- Monarch: Elizabeth II
- Governor: Sir Douglas Kendrew; Sir Hughie Edwards
- Deputy: Herb Graham; Don Taylor
- Preceded by: Sir David Brand
- Succeeded by: Sir Charles Court

1st Deputy Premier of Western Australia
- In office 7 December 1955 – 2 April 1959
- Premier: Bert Hawke
- Succeeded by: Arthur Watts

Leader of the Opposition
- In office 31 December 1966 – 3 March 1971
- Premier: Sir David Brand
- Deputy: Herb Graham
- Preceded by: Bert Hawke
- Succeeded by: Sir David Brand
- In office 8 April 1974 – 15 April 1976
- Premier: Sir Charles Court
- Deputy: Colin Jamieson
- Preceded by: Sir Charles Court
- Succeeded by: Colin Jamieson

Leader of the Western Australian Labor Party
- In office 31 December 1966 – 15 April 1976
- Preceded by: Bert Hawke
- Succeeded by: Colin Jamieson

Member of the Western Australian Legislative Assembly
- In office 25 March 1950 – 19 February 1977
- Preceded by: Constituency established
- Succeeded by: Barry Hodge
- Constituency: Melville
- In office 8 April 1933 – 25 March 1950
- Preceded by: Hubert Parker
- Succeeded by: Constituency abolished
- Constituency: North-East Fremantle

Personal details
- Born: John Trezise Tonkin; 2 February 1902 Boulder, Western Australia
- Died: 20 October 1995 (aged 93) South Perth, Western Australia
- Party: Labor
- Spouses: Rosalie Maud Cleghorn (m. 1926; died 1969) Winifred Joan West (m. 1971)
- Children: 3 from first marriage
- Occupation: Schoolteacher, politician
- Nickname(s): Honest John, Supertonk

John Trezise Tonkin (2 February 1902 – 20 October 1995) was an Australian politician who was the premier of Western Australia from 3 March 1971 to 8 April 1974. A member of the Labor Party, Tonkin was a minister in the Willcock, Wise and Hawke state governments. He was a member of the Western Australian Legislative Assembly from 1933 to 1977, making him the longest-serving member of the Parliament of Western Australia as of 2021.

Tonkin was born in the Goldfields town of Boulder, Western Australia, the eldest of three children. His family moved several times before returning to Boulder, where he attended Boulder City Central School and Eastern Goldfields High School. After several successive jobs, he graduated from Claremont Teachers College and became a teacher, mainly working in small schools in rural areas. After several unsuccessful attempts to enter state parliament, Tonkin was elected as the member for North-East Fremantle in the 1933 state election.

Tonkin first served as a minister from 1943 to 1947. He held several portfolios during this time, the most important being education. Labor lost the 1947 state election which resulted in Tonkin losing his portfolios. He transferred to the electoral district of Melville when North-East Fremantle was abolished in 1950. After the resignation of Wise as Labor leader in 1951, Hawke became leader and Tonkin became deputy leader. When Labor won the 1953 state election, he reassumed his role as a minister, including as the minister for works and minister for water supplies. In 1955, he became the first deputy premier of Western Australia following an act of parliament to formally create the position. Labor lost the 1959 state election, causing Tonkin to lose his portfolios again.

Following the resignation of Hawke in 1966, Tonkin became the leader of the Labor Party in Western Australia. After its longest period in opposition ever, the Labor Party won the 1971 state election to defeat David Brand and make Tonkin premier. Labor's one-seat majority meant that any by-election had a chance of defeating the Tonkin government. By-elections occurred in 1971 and 1973, each of which was narrowly won by Labor. The Tonkin government's achievements included reforms in industrial relations and employment, and the passing of the Aboriginal Heritage Act 1972. After three years in government, Labor was defeated in the 1974 state election. Tonkin was succeeded as premier by Charles Court. Tonkin was made a Companion of the Order of Australia in 1977, and has been honoured with the Tonkin Highway and John Tonkin College being named after him.

== Early life ==
Tonkin was born on 2 February 1902 in the town of Boulder, near Kalgoorlie, in the Goldfields of Western Australia. His parents were engine driver John Trezise Tonkin and Julia, née Carrigan, both of whom were born in Australia and had Cornish ancestry. He was the eldest of three surviving children and was brought up as a Methodist, although his mother was Catholic. In his early childhood, the Tonkin family moved to the states of Victoria and South Australia, then to the town of Gwalia in Western Australia, before moving back to Boulder. He attended Boulder City Central School (graduating as a dux) and Eastern Goldfields High School. His father was a unionist and a supporter of the Australian Labor Party and Tonkin became interested in politics at a young age.

After leaving school at 15, Tonkin worked as an office boy for Kalgoorlie Electric Power Co. Ltd., a monitor at Brown Hill State School, and a relief teacher at Edjudina. In 1921 and 1922, he studied at Claremont Teachers College in Perth and graduated with a teaching certificate. He then taught at several small schools in the South West until 1930, including in Yallingup, Nuralingup, Margaret River, Kulin, Picton, Karnup, Hamel and Palgarup. Tonkin married Rosalie Maud Cleghorn at St Mary's Church in West Perth on 29 December 1926. They had met at school in Boulder and had attended Claremont Teachers College together. In 1930 they moved to Perth, and Tonkin taught at schools in North Perth and North Fremantle. He also studied accounting by correspondence.

== Early political career ==
Tonkin joined the Labor Party in 1923 and started a branch in Forest Grove. He unsuccessfully contested two seats in the Western Australian Legislative Assembly, the lower house of the Parliament of Western Australia: Sussex in 1927 and Murray-Wellington in 1930. These campaigns helped him gain a profile within the Labor Party. The party's state congress appointed Tonkin to a committee to assess C. H. Douglas's social credit theory that the government could help the ongoing economic crisis by "[taking] over the control and issue of all money" from the banking system. Among the other five members of the committee was future prime minister of Australia John Curtin. The committee concluded that the scheme was "theoretically unsound and unworkable in practice".

Tonkin narrowly won the Labor Party's endorsement for the marginal Legislative Assembly seat of North-East Fremantle for the 1933 state election. He then defeated the minister for education, Hubert Parker, to become the first teacher to be elected to the Parliament of Western Australia. The Labor Party gained seven seats in total, enough for Philip Collier to become premier of Western Australia. Among those elected were two other future premiers: Frank Wise and Bert Hawke. Wise, Hawke and Tonkin soon became leading members of the backbench, becoming known as the "three musketeers". The Labor caucus elected Wise to the ministry in 1935 and Hawke in 1936, but Tonkin had to wait until 1943 due to his lack of union or religious connections. He also annoyed his colleagues by speaking on a wide range of issues and for having a tendency to lecture.

The parliamentary term for the Legislative Assembly was three years. Tonkin came close to losing in the 1936 state election, which led him to pay more attention to the needs of his constituency. He improved his skills in parliament and adjusted his approach to be less aggressive and more measured. Tonkin increased his margin in the 1939 state election. After the death of May Holman, Tonkin became state secretary of the Labor Party, a role in which he served until 1943. In 1940, he was granted leave from parliament to enlist in the Citizen Military Forces (now the Australian Army Reserve) to fight in World War II. He enlisted with the 25th Light Horse Regiment in October 1940, became a qualified signaller in January 1941, and joined the 11th Battalion in May 1941 upon being promoted to corporal. In December 1941, he was called up for full-time deployment and the battalion was mobilised, but Tonkin spent much of that time on leave without pay. He was promoted to sergeant in January 1942, and on 30 January 1942, he was discharged.

In 1942, Tonkin and Hawke were appointed by cabinet to travel to the eastern states to lobby Prime Minister John Curtin, commonwealth ministers, and departmental heads for greater defences for Western Australia. It was felt that the state was vulnerable to a possible Japanese attack. Curtin was also the local member for Fremantle in the Australian House of Representatives and Tonkin had a close working relationship with him. In late 1942 and early 1943, Tonkin supported Curtin's attempts to introduce conscription for soldiers to defend Australia.

== Frontbench ==
=== Willcock and Wise governments (1943–1947) ===
The next state election was held in December 1943. The election had been postponed by two years due to the war and Labor won for the fourth time in a row. Under Labor Party rules, the ministry was chosen by the Labor caucus and the premier allocated their roles. Tonkin was elected and Premier John Willcock appointed him as minister for education, fulfilling a long-held dream of Tonkin's, and minister for social services, a newly-created position. He was sworn into the ministry on 9 December. Tonkin started to contemplate transferring to federal politics. He was asked to contest the 1945 Fremantle by-election after the death of Curtin, but he declined, wanting to remain involved in education in Western Australia. When Willcock resigned and Wise became premier in July 1945, Tonkin retained his ministry portfolios and took on the additional role of minister for agriculture.

Tonkin saw his greatest achievements in education as being the merging of one-teacher schools, commonplace in rural areas, into larger schools; upgrading school facilities; reducing class sizes; and improving teacher training. He rejected calls from the opposition for the establishment of segregation between Aboriginal and white students, saying he had observed from his teaching experience that Aboriginal children "learned just as well as the white children, and behaved just as well, in some cases even better".

=== In opposition (1947–1953) ===
Tonkin lost his position as a minister when Labor lost the 1947 state election to the Liberal–Country Party Coalition. Wise continued as the party's leader, losing the 1950 state election. In that election, Tonkin's seat of North-East Fremantle was abolished due to a redistribution, so he transferred to the new seat of Melville. Wise resigned as Labor Party leader in June 1951 to be appointed administrator of the Northern Territory. In the ensuing leadership ballot, Hawke was elected leader and Tonkin was elected as his deputy. Outside of parliament, Tonkin was president of the East Fremantle Football Club from March 1947 to December 1953.

=== Hawke government (1953–1959) ===
After six years in opposition, Labor won the 1953 state election. As Tonkin was the deputy leader, Hawke allowed him to choose his own portfolios, and Tonkin made himself the minister for works and the minister for water supplies. He was attracted to those positions as they were "big spending departments", saying those positions were "the greatest opportunity... where one can achieve most". For the first fifteen months of the Hawke ministry, Tonkin was also the minister for education after some persuasion by Hawke. In 1955, Tonkin became the first deputy premier as well. He had been in the role unofficially since the 1953 state election, and had been acting premier from May to July 1953 whilst Hawke was attending the coronation of Elizabeth II.

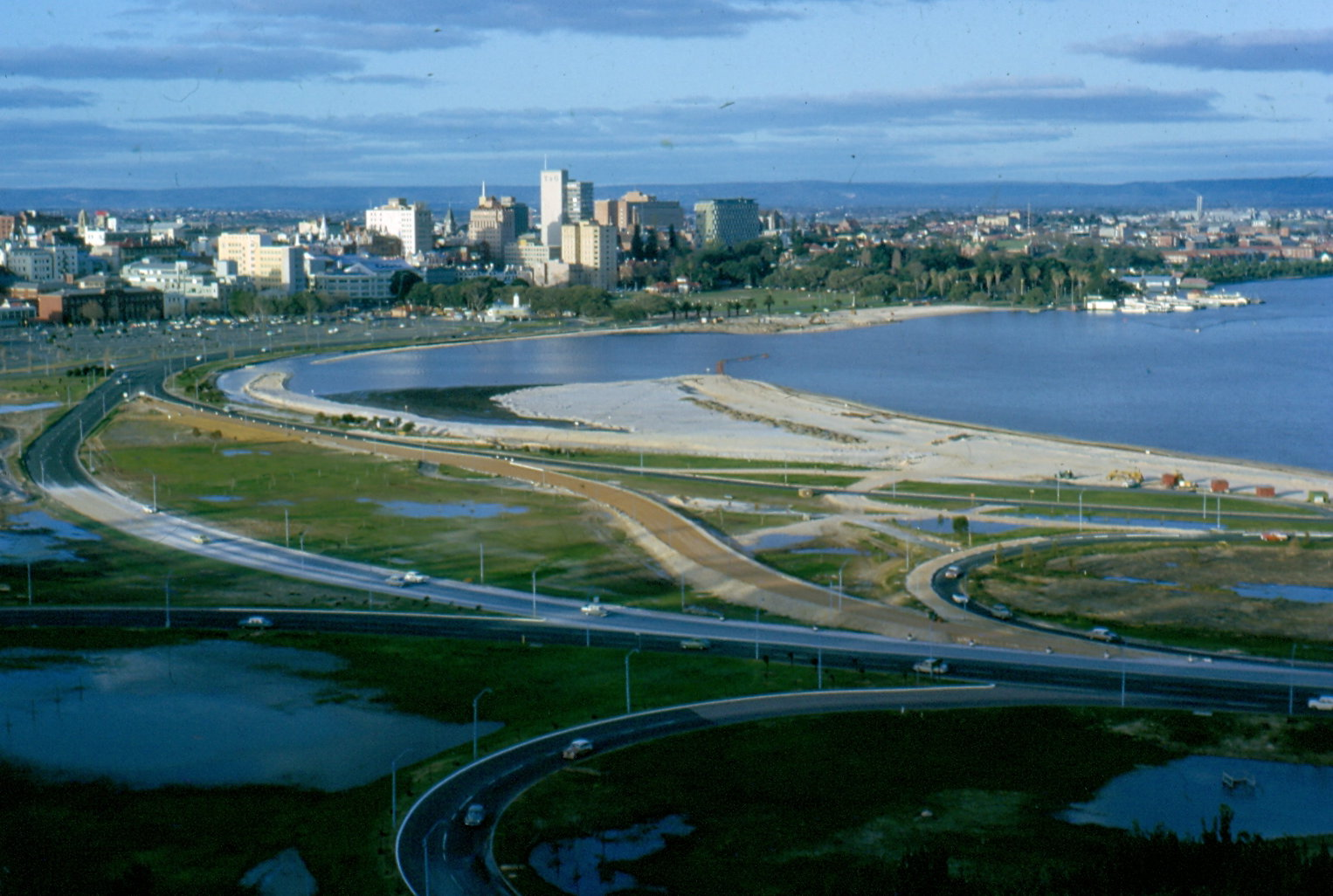
Land reclamation for the Narrows Bridge

In July 1953, as acting premier and minister for works, Tonkin announced plans to build a controlled-access highway between Perth and Kwinana to the south, which became known as the Kwinana Freeway. He was involved in planning and beginning the construction of the Narrows Bridge and interchange, which crossed the Swan River to link South Perth with the central business district, and the first stage of the Kwinana Freeway from the bridge to Canning Highway. The Narrows Bridge was controversial because it required large amounts of land reclamation within Mounts Bay. Tonkin said that although he regretted it, the increase in car traffic required "some encroachment upon natural conditions". Tonkin announced a different name for the bridge in February 1959: the "Golden West Bridge". This name was controversial for copying the name of the Golden Gate Bridge and the name of a popular local soft drink, "Golden West". The name was reverted to the Narrows Bridge after Labor was defeated in the 1959 state election. The bridge was opened by the Brand government in November 1959.

As the minister for water supplies, Tonkin managed the extension of the Comprehensive Agricultural Water Supplies Scheme to the Great Southern region and initiated planning for the Serpentine Dam. In 1958, he led a trade mission to Europe and the United States to attract investors to Western Australia. The concessions Tonkin offered to potential companies were criticised by the opposition as being too generous.

=== In opposition (1959–1971) ===
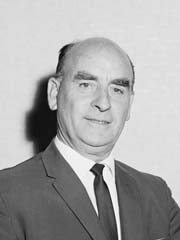
Tonkin in 1964.

Hawke and the Labor Party lost the 1959 state election to David Brand and the Coalition, but Hawke continued as party leader. Labor narrowly lost the 1962 state election, falling one seat short of victory. In the 1965 state election, the party lost several seats. Hawke resigned in December 1966 and Tonkin was elected party leader, thus becoming the leader of the opposition. Herb Graham was elected deputy leader.

Tonkin gained national attention when he emerged as a strong advocate for the Labor Party to drop its opposition to state aid for private schools, joining deputy federal Labor leader Gough Whitlam and many others who believed that the Labor Party could not be elected as long as it opposed it. Tonkin said that in Western Australia, funding for private schools, particularly Catholic schools, had eased the burden on the public school system and offered parents more choice in schools. At the Labor Party's 1966 national conference at Surfers Paradise, Queensland, Tonkin successfully persuaded the party to reverse its opposition to state aid for private schools.

Tonkin managed to gain the support of mining entrepreneurs Lang Hancock and Peter Wright amidst a dispute between them and the minister for industrial development, Charles Court. Hancock and Wright wanted the finders of mineral deposits to have control over how they are developed, whereas Court wanted the government to decide which companies to give control to. Tonkin criticised Court's position and expressed support for Hancock and Wright, which resulted in the mining entrepreneurs donating to the Labor Party and giving the Labor Party favourable coverage in their newspaper, the Sunday Independent. Tonkin also persistently criticised the Coalition government for being too secretive.

The Coalition's majority was reduced at the 1968 state election but it still retained power. Hawke retired at that election, making Tonkin the father of the house for having served the longest time in parliament. Tonkin's wife Rosalie died of cancer in January 1969, making him seriously consider retirement. Nevertheless, he continued as opposition leader and contested the 1971 state election.

== Premier (1971–1974) ==
The 1971 election was held on 20 February. The Labor Party defeated the Brand government by one seat after twelve years in opposition. The Labor Party won three seats from the Coalition: Merredin-Yilgarn, Mirrabooka, and Toodyay; giving the party 26 seats out of 51 in the Legislative Assembly. In the Parliament's upper house, the Legislative Council, Labor had no net change in seats, with the party losing the North Province and gaining the Lower North Province. This left the Labor Party with just ten out of the thirty seats in the Legislative Council.

Governor Sir Douglas Kendrew swore Tonkin and his ministry in on 3 March 1971. The twelve-man ministry was chosen by the Labor caucus and Tonkin had the responsibility of allocating the specific ministerial positions. Tonkin himself was sworn in as the premier, minister for education, minister for environmental protection, and minister for cultural affairs, a new position. Notably, Tonkin did not choose to make himself treasurer, bucking the trend set by most previous premiers. Only two members of the ministry had previous ministerial experience: Tonkin and Deputy Premier Graham. As of 2021, Tonkin, who was 69 when he was sworn in, is the oldest person to have become premier of Western Australia and was the first Labor premier to be born in Western Australia.

With just a one-seat majority, the speaker's vote became the deciding vote and any by-election in a Labor seat had the potential to cause a change in government. The government had to be careful that it had a full attendance within the house so its bills would not be defeated. Additionally, the government did not hold a majority in the Legislative Council, despite receiving 62,000 more votes than the Coalition, due to a pro-rural malapportionment. This made it difficult to pass legislation; over the course of the Tonkin government, 21 bills were voted down by the Legislative Council.

On 12 June 1971, Tonkin married Winifred Joan West, a divorcee, at Wesley Church. A Liberal supporter, West was active in the local community, and was appointed a Member of the Order of the British Empire in the 1982 New Year Honours.

=== Budget problems ===
The financial state of the Government of Western Australia was poor throughout Tonkin's premiership. Tonkin managed to secure A$5.6 million (equivalent to A$68.71 million in 2022) in federal funding at the premiers' conference in April 1971 which went some way towards getting the deficit to manageable levels. Tonkin announced that he would not be able to implement the election promises which required funding, to which Opposition Leader Brand responded by saying that Tonkin should not have made such lavish promises when it was known the budget was in bad shape. Despite this, the government implemented its election promise to abolish the Road Maintenance Tax, a tax on the owners of vehicles weighing over 8 long tons (8.1 t). To replace the lost revenue, licensing costs on heavy vehicles were increased and 42 staff at the State Transport Commission were made redundant.

The budget handed down by Treasurer Tom Evans in September 1971 was unpopular. The resignation of Attorney-General and Minister for Railways Ron Bertram on 30 September 1971 due to ill health necessitated Tonkin's first cabinet reshuffle. He took the opportunity to appoint himself treasurer and give away the portfolios of education to Evans and environmental protection to Ron Davies, leaving himself with cultural affairs. In the reshuffle, Arthur Bickerton was added to the cabinet as the minister for housing.

=== Ascot by-election ===
On 8 October 1971, Speaker Merv Toms collapsed on the floor of parliament and later died, necessitating a by-election in the seat of Ascot. Labor had lost its majority pending the by-election and Coalition supporters were calling for a snap election, believing the Coalition would win. Deputy Liberal leader Charles Court told Tonkin that he would not bring a motion of no confidence against the government while they were down one member, but Country Party leader Crawford Nalder gave no such guarantee. Deciding that he should not risk being defeated in a motion of no confidence, Tonkin had Governor Kendrew prorogue parliament, which meant there would be no sittings until after the by-election. As the party that won would be the government after the election, both sides campaigned hard. Court was unusually vigorous, even going doorknocking in Belmont. The Labor candidate Mal Bryce ended up winning the by-election against Liberal candidate Fred Chaney.

=== Dispute with Hanwright ===
Tonkin initially had a good relationship with Hancock and Wright, with Tonkin going on a tour of their company Hanwright's mines in the Pilbara guided by Hancock and his cousin Valston Hancock. Tonkin wanted to make it easier for Hanwright to develop McCamey's Monster, an iron ore deposit. However, officials at the mines department were opposed, and Tonkin eventually agreed with them. With the support of the opposition, the Tonkin government took away Hanwright's occupancy rights to temporary mining leases which had expired, leaving only a few leases with Hanwright. The company challenged this decision in the Supreme Court of Western Australia, but the Tonkin government passed an amendment to the mining act, changing the relevant law to ensure Hanwright would lose. This move was widely supported, including by the opposition and by the media, and has been compared to the 2021 case Mineralogy v Western Australia, where mining businessman Clive Palmer unsuccessfully sued the state government in the High Court for passing legislation to prevent Palmer from suing in the Supreme Court for up to $30 billion in lost revenue.

=== Achievements ===
The Tonkin government implemented several reforms in industrial relations and employment. It appointed an extra industrial commissioner to process arbitration cases. The government reduced the responsibilities of the Department of Labour by transferring the role of representing the government as an employer at the Industrial Commission to the Public Service Board. This allowed the Department of Labour to focus on the health and safety of employees. The government increased the pay rates of apprentices. Public servants were given four weeks of paid annual leave, equal pay for equal work between male and female staff, workers' compensation, and free return airfares for people working north of the 26th parallel. The Legislative Council blocked legislation that provided private sector employees with four weeks of paid annual leave, ten days of paid sick leave per year, and long service leave after ten years.

The Community Welfare Act 1972 merged the former departments for native welfare and child welfare to create the Department of Community Welfare. The Aboriginal Heritage Act 1972 was passed and the Aboriginal Advancement Council was established. In 1971, the Tonkin government established a consumer protection bureau and the Parliamentary Inspector of Administrative Investigations, more commonly known as the ombudsman, the first of its kind in Australia. In 1972, the Tonkin government established the Environmental Protection Authority and significantly increased the number and size of national parks and reserves. The government also introduced free textbooks, free public transport for pensioners, extended the criminal injury compensation scheme, and increased funding for education, public housing, transport, and urban renewal. In 1973, Tonkin opened the Perth Concert Hall.

Tonkin was socially conservative and disagreed with the Labor Party on issues including abortion. He overruled his party's policy by making his government officially opposed to legalising abortion. On the other hand, Tonkin was ardently opposed to the Vietnam War and led marches through the streets in protest to the war. He was also vocally against racism in sport and supported anti-apartheid protesters by speaking out against the South African rugby tour of Australia and proposed South African cricket tour of Australia.

After having lost several relatives to cancer, including his wife, daughter, father, and stepfather, Tonkin promoted alternative cancer therapies, including the Tronado machine, which was not supported by medical sources. As premier, he controversially had a Tronado machine imported, bypassing the Health Department as he believed the department would not approve. The machine was discarded by the succeeding Court government due to being ineffective. Tonkin was opposed to water fluoridation despite the scientific evidence supporting it and promised to end fluoridating Western Australia's water supplies.

=== Balcatta by-election ===
Throughout the course of his government, Tonkin was becoming less and less popular and party and caucus members were agitating for his replacement. Tonkin for a long time had a rivalry with Deputy Premier Graham. When Tonkin had been deputy premier in the Hawke government, he had sometimes intruded on Graham's responsibilities as minister for transport. Graham had long-held ambitions to take over as leader from Tonkin, and according to Mal Bryce, Tonkin was determined to stay as leader at least until Graham retired. Graham eventually got tired of waiting to become premier, and in early 1973, the cabinet approved the appointment of Graham to the Liquor Licensing Court, which meant that Graham would have to resign from parliament. The appointment angered the party caucus in view of the Tonkin government's one-seat majority and because Graham was considered one of the government's better ministers. A vote was held to urge cabinet to reconsider the appointment, but it was defeated 19 votes to 11. Graham resigned from parliament on 30 May 1973, triggering a by-election in the seat of Balcatta for 28 July. Don Taylor was elected by the party to replace Graham as deputy leader.

Labor's Brian Burke won the by-election by just 30 votes in what had previously been a safe seat. The close result caused Opposition Leader Charles Court to request the Legislative Council to block spending bills to force an early election. Although Kendrew was seemingly prepared to dismiss Tonkin and invite Court to form government, the Legislative Council declined to go along with Court's plan. Tonkin also faced threats from within his own party, who thought a younger cabinet was needed to win the upcoming election. The Young Labor Organisation passed a motion of no confidence in Tonkin and sent it to the Labor Party's state executive for consideration. Arthur Tonkin (no relation) and Bryce tried to convince him to stand down as premier, saying there was no way that Labor could win the upcoming election with Tonkin as premier. He resisted further pressure by saying the next state budget in September or October would not be popular and that he should be the premier to reveal it. By the time the budget was released, Labor MPs believed it was too close to the next election for it to be a good idea to change leaders.

=== 1974 state election ===
The Labor Party campaigned in the March 1974 state election under the slogan "Trust Tonkin", highlighting his trustworthiness and reputation for integrity and stability. The Liberal Party on the other hand highlighted the federal Whitlam government, which was increasingly unpopular in Western Australia, and argued the state government was being unduly influenced by the federal government. Whitlam, who was elected prime minister in 1972, was unpopular with farmers for planning to abolish the superphosphate bounty. Despite this, Whitlam attended a rally at Forrest Place one week before the election and against the wishes of Tonkin. The farmers had also coincidentally invited Whitlam to a rally at Subiaco Oval on the same day, but he declined. The farmers instead went to the rally at Forrest Place to disrupt it. Inflammatory comments by Whitlam government minister Fred Daly at Forrest Place enraged the farmers and led to objects being thrown at Whitlam. Another unpopular action by the Whitlam government was the blocking of an Alwest joint venture for an aluminium refinery near Bunbury due to its majority foreign ownership and environmental concerns.

The election resulted in a primary vote swing against Labor of 0.81 per cent. The largest swings were in rural areas, and this led to the Coalition winning the seats of Albany, Merredin-Yilgarn, Pilbara, and Toodyay, enough for the Coalition to win the election. Tonkin was succeeded as premier by Charles Court on 8 April 1974.

Many people laid the blame for Labor's defeat on the Whitlam government. Liberal turned independent MP Ian Thompson said that Whitlam was a bigger factor in Labor's defeat than the work done by Court as opposition leader. Thompson said: "I can tell [Court] that had it not been for Whitlam, we wouldn't have won the 1974 election and, indeed, I regard Tonkin as one of the unluckiest premiers this state has known". Court said that "John Tonkin, instead of finding himself with a friend in Canberra, found himself with a person who was trying to tip Australia upside down". Tonkin's wife Joan agreed that Whitlam damaged Labor in Western Australia. On the other hand, Deputy Premier Don Taylor said Court had led the Liberals to victory by "good generalship" and that Whitlam had not been a big factor.

== Later life ==
Tonkin continued on as opposition leader, heading the Tonkin shadow ministry, the first formal shadow ministry in Western Australia. He resigned as leader on 15 April 1976 and chose not to contest his seat at the 1977 state election. He was succeeded in the seat of Melville by Barry Hodge and as the leader of the Labor Party by Colin Jamieson. Tonkin had served in parliament for 43 years, ten months and eleven days, making him the longest-serving member of the Parliament of Western Australia as of 2021.

In the 1977 Queen's Birthday Honours, Tonkin was appointed as a Companion of the Order of Australia "for eminent and meritorious service to politics and government". In the same year, Tonkin was made a freeman of the Town of East Fremantle.

In his retirement, Tonkin lived in East Fremantle and later South Perth. He died at Concorde Nursing Home in South Perth on 20 October 1995. A state funeral service was held at Wesley Church five days later and he was cremated at Fremantle Cemetery. Former governor Francis Burt eulogised Tonkin by saying that "he never generated cynicism or malice" and "we always knew we could trust him".

== Legacy ==
In 1985, the Beechboro–Gosnells Highway was renamed Tonkin Highway upon the opening of stage four, which linked Hardey Road in Cloverdale to Great Eastern Highway in Redcliffe. Tonkin cut the ribbon at that stage's opening ceremony on 1 May 1985. The headquarters of the Water Authority of Western Australia (later Water Corporation) in Leederville was named the John Tonkin Water Centre in 1985. A park in East Fremantle is named John Tonkin Reserve.

The East Fremantle house which Tonkin lived in from 1939 to 1989, a California bungalow on Preston Point Road, was assessed for placement on the State Register of Heritage Places in 2003, but the minister for heritage, Tom Stephens, directed that the house not be added to the register, against the advice of the Heritage Council of Western Australia. Stephens' decision became controversial when the owners applied in December 2003 to have the house demolished. The Town of East Fremantle rejected the application, wanting for the house to be heritage listed, but the Town Planning Appeal Tribunal overturned the decision in August 2004. Local heritage activists and the National Trust of Western Australia called for the house to be heritage-listed. The house was eventually demolished in 2007.

In September 2011, it was announced that the new school in Mandurah formed by the merger of Mandurah High School and Mandurah Senior College would be named John Tonkin College. Members of Tonkin's family, including his widow Joan, attended the official naming ceremony on 16 November 2011. The school opened at the start of the 2012 school year.

== See also ==
- Electoral results for the district of North-East Fremantle
- Electoral results for the district of Melville

Western Australian Legislative Assembly
| Preceded by Hubert Parker | Member for North-East Fremantle; 8 April 1933 – 25 March 1950 | Abolished |
| New seat | Member for Melville; 25 March 1950 – 19 February 1977 | Succeeded by Barry Hodge |
Political offices
| New title | Deputy Premier of Western Australia; 7 December 1955 – 2 April 1959 | Succeeded by Arthur Watts |
| Preceded by Bert Hawke | Leader of the Opposition; 1 January 1967 – 2 March 1971 | Succeeded by Sir David Brand |
| Preceded by Sir David Brand | Premier of Western Australia; 3 March 1971 – 8 April 1974 | Succeeded by Sir Charles Court |
| Preceded by Tom Evans | Treasurer of Western Australia; 12 October 1971 – 8 April 1974 | Succeeded by Sir Charles Court |
| Preceded by Sir Charles Court | Leader of the Opposition; 8 April 1974 – 15 April 1976 | Succeeded by Colin Jamieson |
Party political offices
| New title | Deputy Leader of the Western Australian Labor Party; 3 July 1951 – 31 December 1966 | Succeeded by Herb Graham |
| Preceded by Bert Hawke | Leader of the Western Australian Labor Party; 31 December 1966 – 15 April 1976 | Succeeded by Colin Jamieson |
