= Boallia, Western Australia =

Locality in the City of Busselton, Western Australia

Boallia
- Suburb
- Coordinates: 33.78°S 115.27°E
- Country: Australia
- State: Western Australia
- LGA: City of Busselton
- Location: 240 km (150 mi) from Perth; 21 km (13 mi) from Busselton

Government
  - State electorate: Vasse
  - Federal division: Forrest

Area
  - Total: 37.5 km^{2} (14.5 sq mi)

Population
  - Total: 39 (SAL 2021)
- Postcode: 6280
Suburbs around Boallia
Jindong	Jindong	Chapman Hill
Kaloorup	Boallia	Chapman Hill
Treeton	Treeton	Chapman Hill

Boallia is a rural locality of the City of Busselton in the South West region of Western Australia.

The City of Busselton and the locality of Boallia are located on the traditional land of the Wardandi (also spelled Wadandi) people, of the Noongar nation.

Boallia was established as a Group Settlement with the group number 59 in May 1923.
