= Electoral results for the district of North-East Fremantle =

Western Australian district election results

This is a list of electoral results for the Electoral district of North-East Fremantle in Western Australian state elections.

== Members for North-East Fremantle ==
Member	Party	Term
William Angwin	Labor	1911–1927
Francis Rowe	Labor	1927–1930
Hubert Parker	Nationalist	1930–1933
John Tonkin	Labor	1933–1950

== Election results ==
=== Elections in the 1940s ===
1947 Western Australian state election: North-East Fremantle
Party	Candidate	Votes	%	±%
Labor	John Tonkin	unopposed		
Labor hold		Swing		

1943 Western Australian state election: North-East Fremantle
Party	Candidate	Votes	%	±%
Labor	John Tonkin	unopposed		
Labor hold		Swing		

=== Elections in the 1930s ===
1939 Western Australian state election: North-East Fremantle
Party	Candidate	Votes	%	±%
Labor	John Tonkin	3,764	55.6	+2.8
Nationalist	George James	3,006	44.4	−2.8
Total formal votes		6,770	98.5	−0.4
Informal votes		105	1.5	+0.4
Turnout		6,875	96.3	+19.9
Labor hold		Swing	+2.8	

1936 Western Australian state election: North-East Fremantle
Party	Candidate	Votes	%	±%
Labor	John Tonkin	2,689	52.8	−7.1
Nationalist	Eric Isaachsen	2,407	47.2	+7.1
Total formal votes		5,096	98.9	−0.3
Informal votes		56	1.1	+0.3
Turnout		5,152	76.4	−19.1
Labor hold		Swing	−7.1	

1933 Western Australian state election: North-East Fremantle
Party	Candidate	Votes	%	±%
Labor	John Tonkin	3,730	59.9	+10.0
Nationalist	Hubert Parker	2,495	40.1	−10.0
Total formal votes		6,225	99.2	0.0
Informal votes		47	0.8	0.0
Turnout		6,272	95.5	+26.6
Labor gain from Nationalist		Swing	+10.0	

1930 Western Australian state election: North-East Fremantle
Party	Candidate	Votes	%	±%
Nationalist	Hubert Parker	2,554	50.1	
Labor	Francis Rowe	2,541	49.9	
Total formal votes		5,095	99.2	
Informal votes		39	0.8	
Turnout		5,134	68.9	
Nationalist gain from Labor		Swing		

=== Elections in the 1920s ===
1927 Western Australian state election: North-East Fremantle
Party	Candidate	Votes	%	±%
Labor	Francis Rowe	4,009	72.5	−27.5
Nationalist	Oliver Strang	1,518	27.5	+27.5
Total formal votes		5,527	98.3	
Informal votes		93	1.7	
Turnout		5,620	75.0	
Labor hold		Swing	N/A	

1924 Western Australian state election: North-East Fremantle
Party	Candidate	Votes	%	±%
Labor	William Angwin	unopposed		
Labor hold		Swing		

1921 Western Australian state election: North-East Fremantle
Party	Candidate	Votes	%	±%
Labor	William Angwin	unopposed		
Labor hold		Swing		

=== Elections in the 1910s ===
1917 Western Australian state election: North-East Fremantle
Party	Candidate	Votes	%	±%
Labor	William Angwin	unopposed		
Labor hold		Swing		

1914 Western Australian state election: North-East Fremantle
Party	Candidate	Votes	%	±%
Labor	William Angwin	2,784	68.8	−5.9
Liberal	Samuel Thomson	1,260	31.2	+12.4
Total formal votes		4,044	99.3	+0.4
Informal votes		27	0.7	−0.4
Turnout		4,071	63.0	−23.9
Labor hold		Swing	N/A	

1911 Western Australian state election: North-East Fremantle
Party	Candidate	Votes	%	±%
Labor	William Angwin	2,593	74.7	
Ministerialist	Patrick Hevron	652	18.8	
Ministerialist	Dixon Hearder	227	6.5	
Total formal votes		3,472	98.9	
Informal votes		37	1.1	
Turnout		3,509	86.9	
Labor hold		Swing		

- Preferences were not distributed.
