= Electoral results for the district of Melville =

Western Australian district election results

This is a list of electoral results for the Electoral district of Melville in Western Australian state elections.

== Members for Melville ==
| Member | Party | Term |
|---|---|---|
| John Tonkin | Labor | 1950–1977 |
| Barry Hodge | Labor | 1977–1989 |
| Doug Shave | Liberal | 1989–1996 |

== Election results ==
1993 Western Australian state election: Melville
| Party | Candidate | Votes | % | ±% |
|---|---|---|---|---|
| Liberal | Doug Shave | 10,433 | 53.6 | +9.3 |
| Labor | William Lyon | 6,338 | 32.5 | −11.8 |
| Greens | Valerie Cousins | 668 | 3.4 | −1.3 |
| Independent | Margaret Barton | 608 | 3.1 | +3.1 |
| Independent | Shirley de la Hunty | 555 | 2.9 | +2.9 |
| Independent | Anthony Buhagiar | 457 | 2.4 | +2.4 |
| Democrats | Ann Curtis | 235 | 1.2 | +1.2 |
| Independent | Michael McKibbin | 184 | 0.9 | +0.9 |
| Total formal votes | | 19,478 | 95.5 | +3.5 |
| Informal votes | | 921 | 4.5 | −3.5 |
| Turnout | | 20,399 | 94.6 | +2.1 |
Two-party-preferred result
| Liberal | Doug Shave | 11,746 | 60.3 | +10.2 |
| Labor | William Lyon | 7,732 | 39.7 | −10.2 |
| Liberal hold | | Swing | +10.2 | |

=== Elections in the 1980s ===
1989 Western Australian state election: Melville
| Party | Candidate | Votes | % | ±% |
|---|---|---|---|---|
| Liberal | Doug Shave | 8,159 | 44.3 | +4.5 |
| Labor | Barry Hodge | 8,159 | 44.3 | −15.9 |
| Greens | Paul Llewellyn | 858 | 4.7 | +4.7 |
| Grey Power | Leslie Sells | 732 | 4.0 | +4.0 |
| Independent | Bernard Putnin | 508 | 2.8 | +2.8 |
| Total formal votes | | 18,416 | 92.0 | |
| Informal votes | | 1,605 | 8.0 | |
| Turnout | | 20,021 | 92.5 | |
Two-party-preferred result
| Liberal | Doug Shave | 9,224 | 50.1 | +10.3 |
| Labor | Barry Hodge | 9,192 | 49.9 | −10.3 |
| Liberal gain from Labor | | Swing | +10.3 | |

1986 Western Australian state election: Melville
| Party | Candidate | Votes | % | ±% |
|---|---|---|---|---|
| Labor | Barry Hodge | 12,642 | 69.5 | −1.7 |
| Liberal | Eric Zumbo | 5,550 | 30.5 | +1.7 |
| Total formal votes | | 18,192 | 97.0 | −0.3 |
| Informal votes | | 567 | 3.0 | +0.3 |
| Turnout | | 18,759 | 92.5 | −0.4 |
| Labor hold | | Swing | −1.7 | |

1983 Western Australian state election: Melville
| Party | Candidate | Votes | % | ±% |
|---|---|---|---|---|
| Labor | Barry Hodge | 11,464 | 71.2 | |
| Liberal | Judith Gleeson | 4,629 | 28.8 | |
| Total formal votes | | 16,093 | 97.3 | |
| Informal votes | | 447 | 2.7 | |
| Turnout | | 16,540 | 92.9 | |
| Labor hold | | Swing | | |

1980 Western Australian state election: Melville
| Party | Candidate | Votes | % | ±% |
|---|---|---|---|---|
| Labor | Barry Hodge | 8,972 | 62.8 | +3.0 |
| Liberal | Geoffrey Baldock | 4,661 | 32.6 | −7.6 |
| Democrats | James Dunlevy | 663 | 4.6 | +4.6 |
| Total formal votes | | 14,296 | 96.8 | +0.1 |
| Informal votes | | 470 | 3.2 | −0.1 |
| Turnout | | 14766 | 90.4 | −1.8 |
Two-party-preferred result
| Labor | Barry Hodge | 9,303 | 65.1 | +5.3 |
| Liberal | Geoffrey Baldock | 4,993 | 34.9 | −5.3 |
| Labor hold | | Swing | +5.3 | |

=== Elections in the 1970s ===
1977 Western Australian state election: Melville
| Party | Candidate | Votes | % | ±% |
|---|---|---|---|---|
| Labor | Barry Hodge | 8,686 | 59.8 | |
| Liberal | Daryl Williams | 5,831 | 40.2 | |
| Total formal votes | | 14,517 | 96.7 | |
| Informal votes | | 495 | 3.3 | |
| Turnout | | 15,012 | 92.2 | |
| Labor hold | | Swing | −9.8 | |

1974 Western Australian state election: Melville
| Party | Candidate | Votes | % | ±% |
|---|---|---|---|---|
| Labor | John Tonkin | 9,742 | 68.9 | |
| Liberal | Cedric Smith | 3,801 | 26.9 | |
| National Alliance | Barney Foley | 605 | 4.3 | |
| Total formal votes | | 14,148 | 96.8 | |
| Informal votes | | 467 | 3.2 | |
| Turnout | | 14,615 | 91.1 | |
Two-party-preferred result
| Labor | John Tonkin | 9,833 | 69.5 | |
| Liberal | Cedric Smith | 4,315 | 30.5 | |
| Labor hold | | Swing | | |

1971 Western Australian state election: Melville
| Party | Candidate | Votes | % | ±% |
|---|---|---|---|---|
| Labor | John Tonkin | 8,118 | 64.9 | −2.6 |
| Liberal | Peter Whyte | 3,793 | 30.3 | −2.2 |
| Democratic Labor | Douglas O'Reilly | 592 | 4.7 | +4.7 |
| Total formal votes | | 12,503 | 97.6 | +0.3 |
| Informal votes | | 303 | 2.4 | −0.3 |
| Turnout | | 12,806 | 93.3 | −0.6 |
Two-party-preferred result
| Labor | John Tonkin | 8,207 | 65.6 | −1.9 |
| Liberal | Peter Whyte | 4,296 | 34.4 | +1.9 |
| Labor hold | | Swing | −1.9 | |

=== Elections in the 1960s ===
1968 Western Australian state election: Melville
| Party | Candidate | Votes | % | ±% |
|---|---|---|---|---|
| Labor | John Tonkin | 7,566 | 67.5 | |
| Liberal and Country | Albert Box | 3,636 | 32.5 | |
| Total formal votes | | 11,202 | 97.3 | |
| Informal votes | | 305 | 2.7 | |
| Turnout | | 11,507 | 93.9 | |
| Labor hold | | Swing | | |

1965 Western Australian state election: Melville
| Party | Candidate | Votes | % | ±% |
|---|---|---|---|---|
| Labor | John Tonkin | 6,261 | 57.0 | −4.3 |
| Liberal and Country | Albert Gainsford-Brackley | 4,718 | 43.0 | +4.3 |
| Total formal votes | | 10,979 | 97.4 | −1.9 |
| Informal votes | | 293 | 2.6 | +1.9 |
| Turnout | | 11,272 | 94.0 | −0.3 |
| Labor hold | | Swing | −4.3 | |

1962 Western Australian state election: Melville
| Party | Candidate | Votes | % | ±% |
|---|---|---|---|---|
| Labor | John Tonkin | 6,162 | 61.3 | |
| Liberal and Country | Eelco Tacoma | 3,892 | 38.7 | |
| Total formal votes | | 10,054 | 99.3 | |
| Informal votes | | 74 | 0.7 | |
| Turnout | | 10,128 | 94.3 | |
| Labor hold | | Swing | | |

=== Elections in the 1950s ===
1959 Western Australian state election: Melville
| Party | Candidate | Votes | % | ±% |
|---|---|---|---|---|
| Labor | John Tonkin | unopposed | | |
| Labor hold | | Swing | | |

1956 Western Australian state election: Melville
| Party | Candidate | Votes | % | ±% |
|---|---|---|---|---|
| Labor | John Tonkin | 6,837 | 76.2 | |
| Independent | James Hart | 2,132 | 23.8 | |
| Total formal votes | | 8,969 | 97.0 | |
| Informal votes | | 279 | 3.0 | |
| Turnout | | 9,248 | 93.5 | |
| Labor hold | | Swing | | |

1953 Western Australian state election: Melville
| Party | Candidate | Votes | % | ±% |
|---|---|---|---|---|
| Labor | John Tonkin | 7,301 | 67.3 | +5.1 |
| Independent | James Collins | 2,376 | 21.9 | +21.9 |
| Independent | James Hart | 1,173 | 10.8 | +10.8 |
| Total formal votes | | 10,850 | 97.5 | −0.7 |
| Informal votes | | 278 | 2.5 | +0.7 |
| Turnout | | 11,128 | 95.7 | +2.4 |
| Labor hold | | Swing | N/A | |

- Preferences were not distributed.

1950 Western Australian state election: Melville
| Party | Candidate | Votes | % | ±% |
|---|---|---|---|---|
| Labor | John Tonkin | 5,392 | 62.2 | |
| Liberal and Country | Helen Brinkley | 3,275 | 37.8 | |
| Total formal votes | | 8,667 | 98.2 | |
| Informal votes | | 158 | 1.8 | |
| Turnout | | 8,825 | 93.3 | |
| Labor hold | | Swing | | |
