= Rosa Brook, Western Australia =

Rosa Brook
- Town
- Coordinates: 33.94°S 115.19°E
- Country: Australia
- State: Western Australia
- LGA: Shire of Augusta-Margaret River
- Location: 288 km (179 mi) south of Perth; 11 km (6.8 mi) east of Margaret River; 36 km (22 mi) south of Busselton

Government
  - State electorate: Vasse
  - Federal division: Forrest

Area
  - Total: 65.5 km^{2} (25.3 sq mi)
- Elevation: 106 m (348 ft)

Population
  - Total: 216 (SAL 2021)
- Postcode: 6285

Rosa Brook is a town in the South West region of Western Australia. It is located 288 km south of Perth and the closest populated town is Margaret River. Rosa Brook has a community hall and a local store which was established in 1932 by the Darnell family. The region is best known for farming beef and lamb in addition to harvesting wine and olives.
