= Yelverton, Western Australia =

Place in Western Australia

Yelverton
- Town
- Interactive map of Yelverton
- Coordinates: 33°45′S 115°7′E
- Country: Australia
- State: Western Australia
- LGA: City of Busselton
- Location: 248 km (154 mi) from Perth; 27 km (17 mi) from Busselton; 26 km (16 mi) from Margaret River

Government
  - State electorate: Vasse
  - Federal division: Forrest

Area
  - Total: 34.1 km^{2} (13.2 sq mi)
- Elevation: 80 m (260 ft)

Population
  - Total: 72 (SAL 2021)
- Time zone: UTC+8 (AWST)
- Postcode: 6280

Yelverton is a locality in Western Australia's South West region in the local government area of the City of Busselton. At the 2021 census, it had a population of 72. It was named after timber merchant Henry Yelverton, who established a timber mill there in 1856. The area was part of the Group Settlement Scheme, and a school existed there from 1934 to 1937. Yelverton National Park is in the locality.
