= Bramley, Western Australia =

Bramley
- Town
- Coordinates: 33°56′2″S 115°4′51″E
- Country: Australia
- State: Western Australia
- LGA(s): Shire of Augusta-Margaret River
- Location: 13 km (8.1 mi) north-east of Margaret River

Government
  - State electorate(s): Vasse
  - Federal division(s): Forrest

Area
  - Total: 50.4 km^{2} (19.5 sq mi)

Population
  - Total(s): 113 (SAL 2021)
- Postcode: 6285

Bramley is a small townsite located in the South West region of Western Australia in the Shire of Augusta-Margaret River. It is the location of the Margaret River Airport.
