= Abba River, Western Australia =

Place in Western Australia

Abba River
- Town
- Coordinates: 33°39′S 115°29′E
- Country: Australia
- State: Western Australia
- LGA(s): City of Busselton
- Location: 216 km (134 mi) from Perth; 20 km (12 mi) from Busselton
- Established: 1987

Government
  - State electorate(s): Vasse
  - Federal division(s): Forrest

Area
  - Total: 28.4 km^{2} (11.0 sq mi)

Population
  - Total(s): 83 (SAL 2021)
- Time zone: UTC+8 (AWST)
- Postcode: 6280

Abba River is a locality in Western Australia's South West region in the local government area of the City of Busselton. At the 2021 census, it had a population of 83. It was established as a bounded locality in 1987 and named after the nearby river with the same name. The river was named in 1834 by Frederick Ludlow. The name is Aboriginal in origin and is a greeting word used by the local peoples.
