= Rosa Glen, Western Australia =

Rosa Glen
- Town
- Interactive map of Rosa Glen
- Coordinates: 34°0′53″S 115°12′11″E
- Country: Australia
- State: Western Australia
- LGA: Shire of Augusta-Margaret River

Government
  - State electorate: Vasse
  - Federal division: Forrest

Area
  - Total: 66.3 km^{2} (25.6 sq mi)

Population
  - Total: 188 (SAL 2021)
- Postcode: 6285

Rosa Glen is a small townsite located in the South West region of Western Australia in the Shire of Augusta-Margaret River.
