= Metricup, Western Australia =

Locality in Western Australia

Metricup
- Town
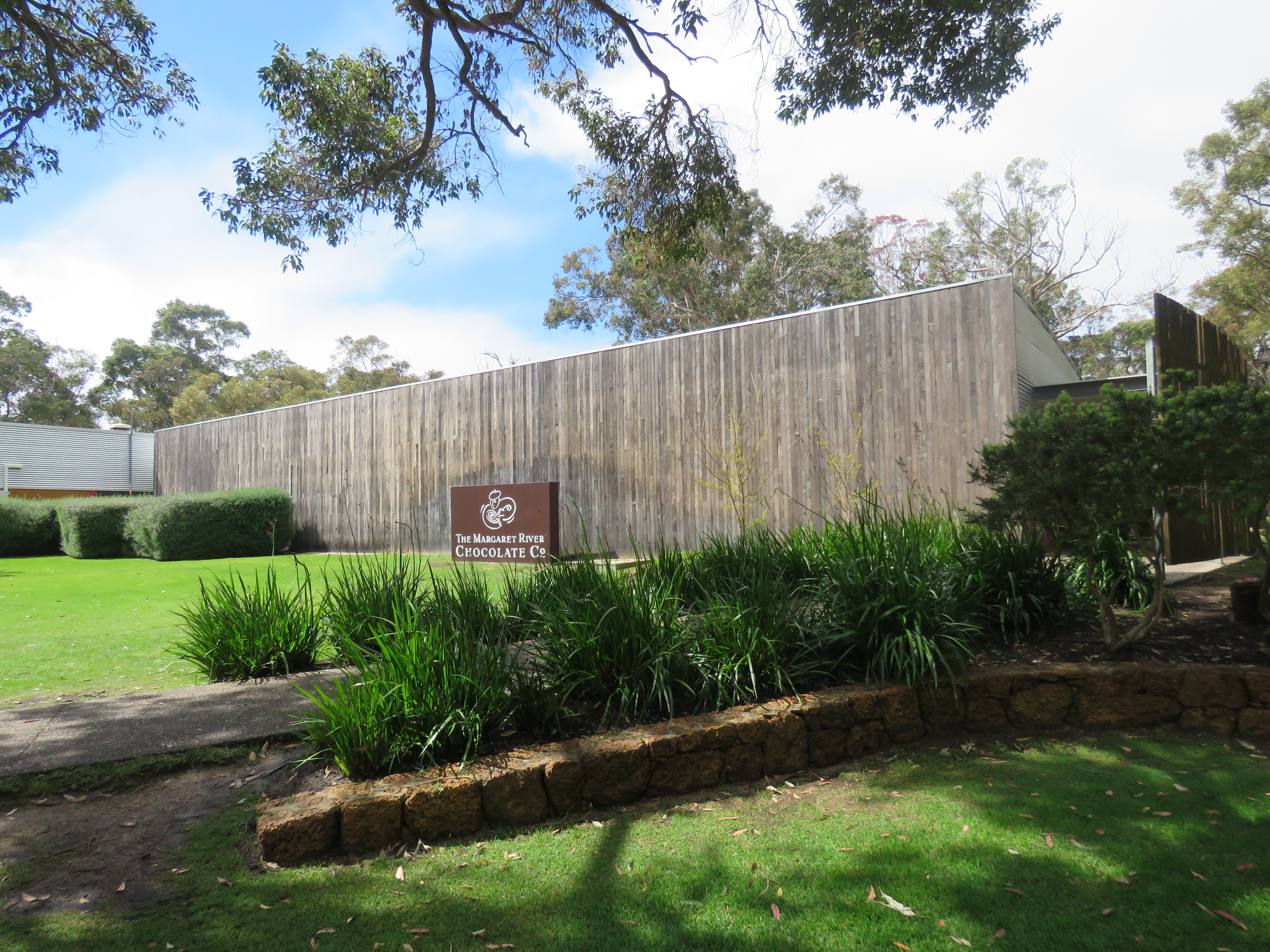
- The Margaret River Chocolate Company in Metricup

- Coordinates: 33°46′S 115°8′E
- Country: Australia
- State: Western Australia
- LGA(s): City of Busselton
- Location: 252 km (157 mi) from Perth; 32 km (20 mi) from Busselton; 18 km (11 mi) from Margaret River; 6 km (3.7 mi) from Cowaramup

Government
  - State electorate(s): Vasse
  - Federal division(s): Forrest

Area
  - Total: 57.2 km^{2} (22.1 sq mi)

Population
  - Total(s): 263 (SAL 2021)
- Time zone: UTC+8 (AWST)
- Postcode: 6280

Metricup is a locality in the South West region of Western Australia near the town of Cowaramup on the Bussell Highway. It is in the Margaret River wine region and its local government area is the City of Busselton. At the 2021 census, it had a population of 263.

== History ==
Established as the social centre for Group 60 of the Group Settlement Scheme in the 1920s, Metricup was known as Boyndlie Park until 1928, when it was renamed to its present name after the railway siding on the Flinders Bay branch railway; no variant of the name appears in any South West Aboriginal word lists and it is believed that the name was invented by the Western Australian Government Railways department. A school operated in the area from 1924 to 1953 and the St. John the Baptist Anglican Church, which is still operating, opened in 1935.

== Present day ==
Tourist accommodation, Wine-making, cattle-farming, and gourmet food production are the main industries of the area. Metricup contains the Margaret River Chocolate Company, established in 1999 as the first chocolate factory in the Margaret River region, and the Margaret River Dairy Company, which under an earlier incarnation was the first Western Australian company to commercially produce Brie cheese in 1986. St Mary's Anglican Girls' School, which is based in the Perth suburb of Karrinyup, has an outdoor education centre in Metricup.
