= Jindong, Western Australia =

Place in Western Australia

Jindong
- Town
- Coordinates: 33°44′S 115°14′E
- Country: Australia
- State: Western Australia
- LGA(s): City of Busselton
- Location: 240 km (150 mi) from Perth; 20 km (12 mi) from Busselton

Government
  - State electorate(s): Vasse
  - Federal division(s): Forrest

Area
  - Total: 22.4 km^{2} (8.6 sq mi)

Population
  - Total(s): 68 (SAL 2021)
- Time zone: UTC+8 (AWST)
- Postcode: 6280

Jindong is a locality in Western Australia's South West region in the local government area of the City of Busselton. At the 2021 census, the area had a population of 68. As part of the Group Settlement Scheme, the area had a school from 1924, which was later housed in the local hall, constructed around 1930. There is a motocross track in Jindong.
