= Carbunup River, Western Australia =

Carbunup River
- Town
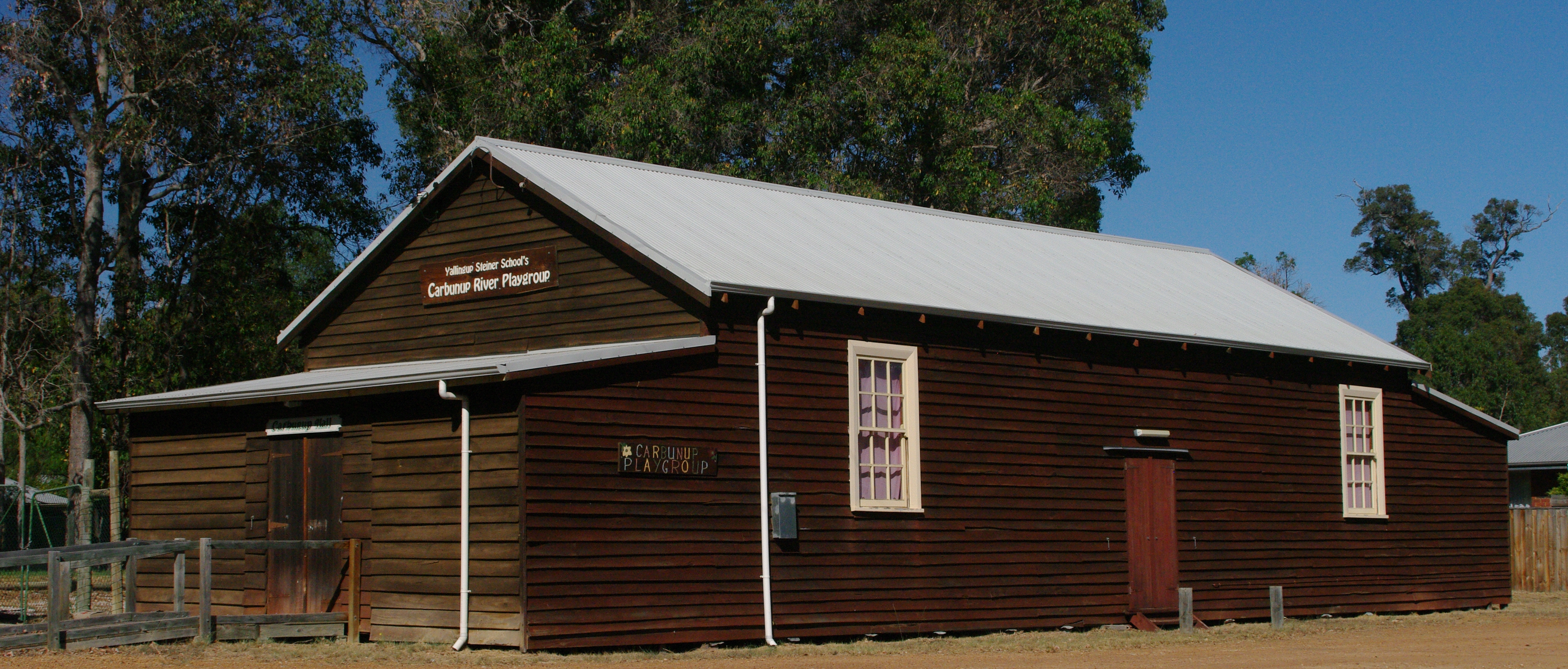
- The local hall

- Coordinates: 33.55°S 115.18°E
- Country: Australia
- State: Western Australia
- LGA(s): City of Busselton
- Location: 247 km (153 mi) SSW of Perth; 15 km (9.3 mi) WSW of Busselton
- Established: 1926

Government
  - State electorate(s): Vasse
  - Federal division(s): Forrest

Area
  - Total: 28 km^{2} (11 sq mi)
- Elevation: 21 m (69 ft)

Population
  - Total(s): 112 (SAL 2021)
- Postcode: 6280

Carbunup River is a small town in the South West region of Western Australia. At the 2021 census, it had a population of 112. It is situated between Dunsborough and Margaret River on the banks of the Carbunup River.

The townsite was declared in 1926 as Carbunup but the name was changed in 1958 to Carbunup River to prevent confusion with the town of Carbarup near Mount Barker.

The town is named after the Carbunup River, the word Carbunup is Aboriginal in origin and is thought to mean place of the cormorants or place of a kindly stream or place of the Stinkwood thicket.

The Discover Deadly reptile education centre is located in Carbunup River, at 10 Wildwood Road.
