= Margaret River, Western Australia =

Margaret River
- Town
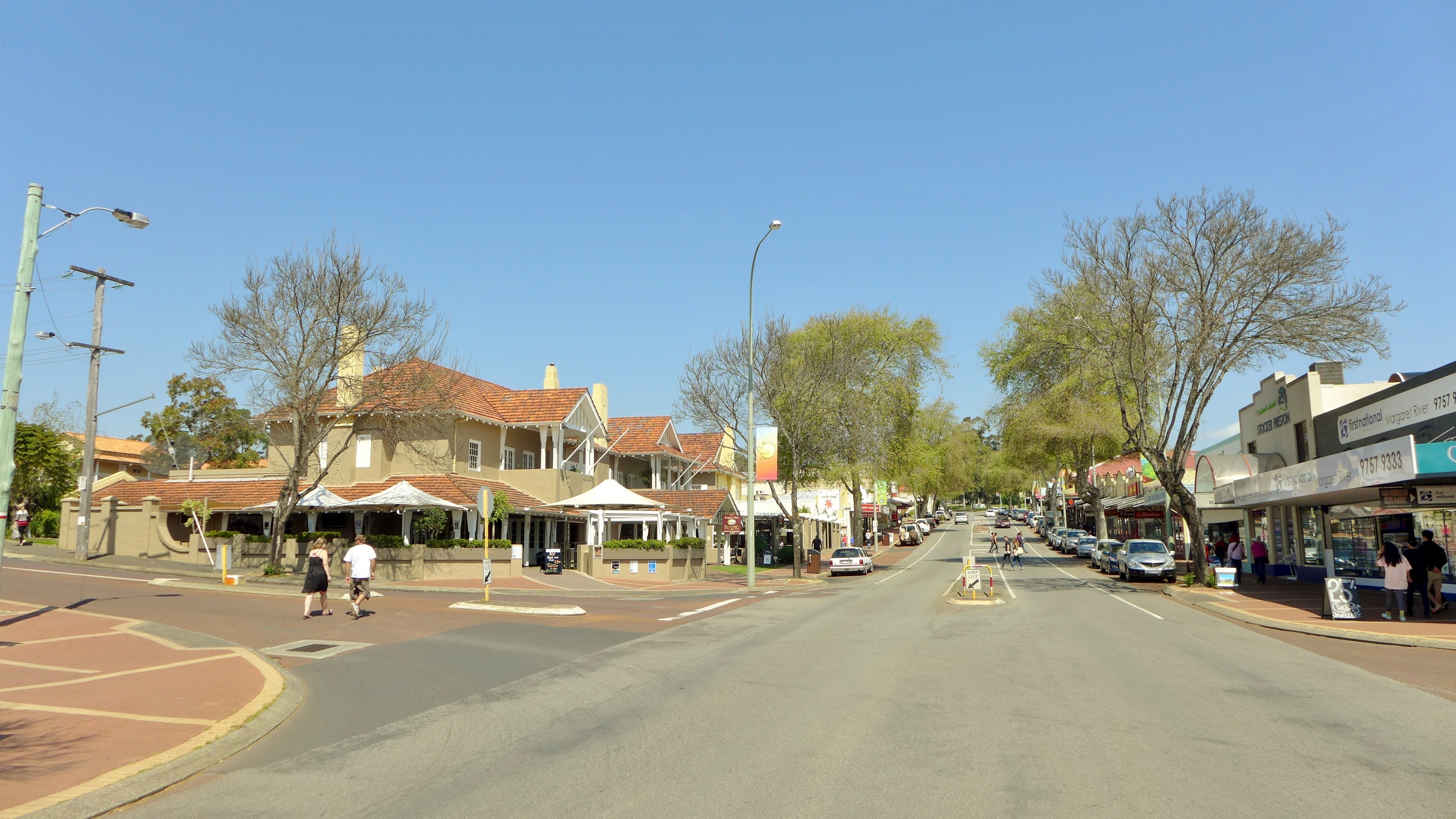
- Town centre

- Interactive map of Margaret River
- Coordinates: 33°57′18″S 115°04′30″E
- Country: Australia
- State: Western Australia
- LGA: Shire of Augusta-Margaret River
- Location: 277 km (172 mi) SSW of Perth; 48 km (30 mi) SW of Busselton
- Established: 1913

Government
  - State electorate: Warren-Blackwood
  - Federal division: Forrest

Area
  - Total: 61.3 km^{2} (23.7 sq mi)
- Elevation: 100 m (330 ft)

Population
  - Total: 7,430 (UCL 2021)
- Postcode: 6285

Margaret River is a town in the South West region of Western Australia, located in the valley of the Margaret River, 277 kilometres (172 mi) south of Perth, the state capital. Its Local Government Area is the Shire of Augusta Margaret River.

Margaret River's coast to the west of the town is a renowned surfing location with worldwide fame for its surf breaks including, but not limited to, 'Main Break' and 'The Box'. Colloquially, the area is referred to as "Margs".

The surrounding area is the Margaret River wine region and is known for its wine production and tourism, attracting an estimated 500,000 visitors annually.

== History ==
The town is named after the river, which is presumed to be named after Margaret Whicher, cousin of John Garrett Bussell (founder of Busselton) in 1831. The name is first shown on a map of the region published in 1839. Before British settlement the area was inhabited by the Noongar people. The first British settlers arrived as early as 1850, with timber logging commencing in around 1870. By 1910, the town had a hotel which also operated as a post office. That year the Margaret River Progress Association requested that a townsite be declared at "the Upper Margaret Bridge", because "the district is likely to be dotted with public buildings several miles apart in the near future if a townsite is not made available shortly". The inspecting district surveyor had a preference for an area near the lower bridge on Caves Road, but his preferred site was unavailable. Lots were surveyed in 1912 and the townsite was gazetted in 1913. From 1918 to 1927, the name of the townsite was officially "Margaret" but it was changed back to "Margaret River" due to local usage.

After World War I, an attempt by the Government of Western Australia to attract migrants to Western Australia (known as the Group Settlement Scheme) and establish farms in the region attracted new settlers to the town. In 1922, over 100 settlers moved into the district.

In the early 1920s, the Busselton to Margaret River Railway was built and, in 1925, the Margaret River to Flinders Bay line opened.

The Perimeter Road, a bypass to take traffic, including heavy vehicles, from Bussell Highway, to the east of the town, and also connect to a new access road to the nearby airport, was opened in December 2018 and completed in February 2019.

== Geography and climate ==
Margaret River

Climate chart (precipitation, max. and min. temperature)
J	F	M	A	M	J	J	A	S	O	N	D
20 25 14	22 25 13	36 24 13	65 22 11	163 19 10	214 17 9	211 16 8	160 16 8	101 17 9	75 18 9	39 21 11	26 23 13
- █ Average max. and min. temperatures in °C
- █ Precipitation totals in mm
Imperial conversion
J	F	M	A	M	J	J	A	S	O	N	D
0.8 77 57	0.9 77 55	1.4 75 55	2.6 72 52	6.4 66 50	8.4 63 48	8.3 61 46	6.3 61 46	4 63 48	3 64 48	1.5 70 52	1 73 55
- █ Average max. and min. temperatures in °F
- █ Precipitation totals in inches

Margaret River is located 9 kilometres (6 mi) inland from the Indian Ocean at a point about halfway between Cape Naturaliste and Cape Leeuwin in Western Australia's South West region.

The climate is warm-summer Mediterranean (Csb in the Köppen climate classification), with an average annual rainfall of around 1,130 millimetres (44 in). Most rain falls between May and August, when around two days in three record measurable rainfall and around one in ten over 10 millimetres (0.39 in). On occasions, as in August 1955, the town has had measurable rain on every day of a month in this period. During the summer, the weather is warm, though there are usually sea breezes, and it is frequently sunny. The dry summers, coupled with strong winds, creates an environment where there is always a high risk of bush fires.

== Wine region ==
Margaret River is the foremost Geographical Indication wine region in the South West Australia Zone, with nearly 55 square kilometres (21 sq mi) under vine and over 138 wineries as at 2008. The region is made up predominantly of boutique-size wine producers, although winery operations range from the smallest, crushing 3.5 tonnes (7,700 lb) per year, to the largest at around 7,000 tonnes (15 million pounds). The region produces just three percent of total Australian grape production, but commands over 20 percent of the Australian premium wine market.

Stretching some 100 kilometres (60 mi) from north to south and about 27 kilometres (17 mi) wide in parts, the region is bounded to the east by the Leeuwin-Naturaliste Ridge, between Cape Naturaliste and Cape Leeuwin, and to the west by the Indian Ocean. A Mediterranean-style climate, lacking extreme summer and winter temperatures, provides ideal growing conditions. The climate is described as similar to that of Bordeaux in a dry vintage.

Humidity levels are ideal during the growing period and the combination of climate, soil and viticulture practices leads to consistently high quality fruit of intense flavour. Consequently, annual vintage results continue to exceed expectations and reinforce Margaret River's reputation as one of the premium wine-producing regions of the world.

The principal grape varieties in the region are fairly evenly split between red and white; Cabernet Sauvignon, Chardonnay, Sauvignon blanc, Shiraz, Merlot, Chenin blanc and Verdelho.

== Caves ==
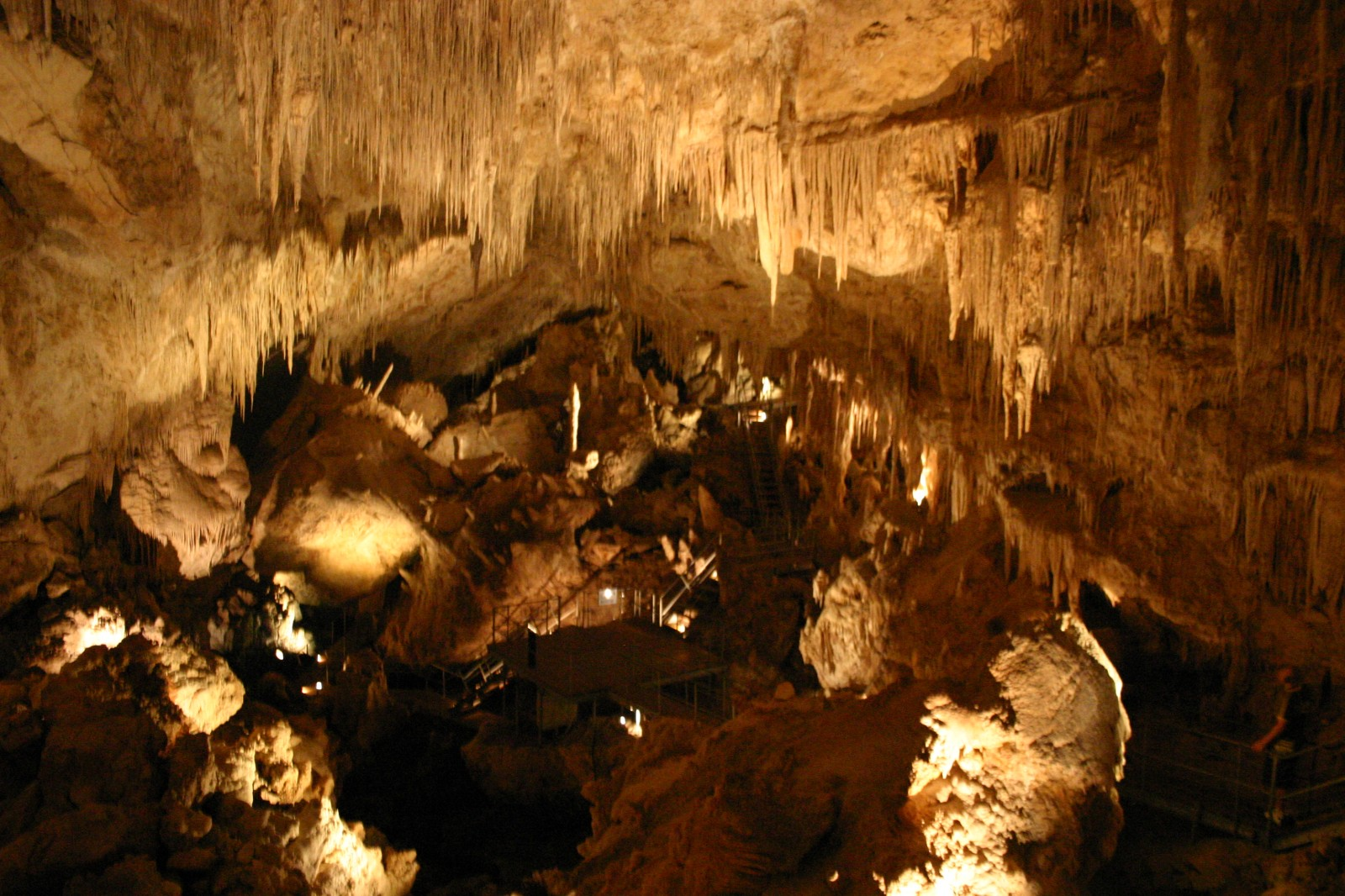
Mammoth Cave

Several hundred caves are located near Margaret River, all of them within Leeuwin-Naturaliste National Park. Six of these are open to the public.

One of these caves is the multi-chambered Mammoth Cave, which lies 21 kilometres (13 mi) south of the town and contains fossils dating back over 35,000 years. The cave was first discovered by European settlers in 1850 and has been open to the public since 1904. The cave can be explored by a self-guided audio tour, and is one of the few caves in Australia offering partial disabled access.

The other five caves open to the public in the area are Jewel Cave, Lake Cave, Ngilgi Cave, Calgardup Cave and Giants Cave. Many other caves can be accessed with a permit by experienced cavers.

== Surfing breaks ==
The Margaret River area has acquired a range of synonyms for the collection of surf breaks nearby, with some 75 breaks along 130 kilometres (81 mi) of coastline. Usually significant surfing competitions concentrate their locale to Margarets Main Break (aka Surfers Point) which breaks in the vicinity of Prevelly at the mouth of Margaret River.

The actual range of surf breaks range from the eastern side of Cape Naturaliste down to just south of Cape Hamelin, and despite web sites and online sources calling the whole Cape Naturaliste to Cape Leeuwin region the Margaret River surfing area, conditions and break types vary along the coast.

The Cowaramup Bombora ("Cow Bombie") big wave surf break 2 kilometres (1.2 mi) offshore produces one of the biggest waves in Australia.

== Education ==
The town contains four primary schools, Margaret River Primary School, Rapids Landing Primary School, Margaret River Montessori School, and St Thomas More Catholic Primary School, and one high school, Margaret River Senior High School. All schools are located within the town itself except for Rapids Landing Primary School, which is located in the suburb of Rapids Landing.

== Media ==
Radio stations that broadcast to the town are ABC South West WA, Triple M Southwest and Radio Margaret River, a community-based, not-for-profit station that provides local news, information, and entertainment which broadcast on 101.9 FM and also online.

Local newspapers are Augusta-Margaret River Times and Augusta-Margaret River Mail.

Television services available include:

- The Australian Broadcasting Corporation (ABC) – ABC TV, ABC Family/ABC Kids, ABC Entertains, ABC News (digital channels)
- The Special Broadcasting Service (SBS) – SBS TV, SBS2, SBS World Movies, SBS Food, SBS WorldWatch, NITV (digital channels)
- Seven (GWN), an owned and operated and formerly affiliated station of the Seven Network
- WIN Television, an affiliate station of the Nine Network
- West Digital Television, an affiliate station of the Network 10 (provided jointly by Southern Cross Media Group and WIN Television)

== Cultural events ==
The World Surf League (WSL) Margaret River Pro is held annually in May attracting professional surfers from across the globe. The CinefestOZ film festival stages several events across the region in late August each year.

== In the media ==
Arte-TV produced an episode of Nouveaux paradis about Margaret River. The 2008 documentary shows interviews with (amongst others) tourist officials, surfers, and dolphin watchers. Margaret River was also visited in the 1966 documentary film The Endless Summer. In 2013, many locals featured in the film Drift, starring Sam Worthington, as well as many surfing scenes being shot on location at local surf breaks such as Grunters and Main Break.

== See also ==
- West Australian wine
- Great Southern (wine region)
