= Pimelea virgata =

Scientific classification
- Kingdom: Plantae
- Clade: Tracheophytes
- Clade: Angiosperms
- Clade: Eudicots
- Clade: Rosids
- Order: Malvales
- Family: Thymelaeaceae
- Genus: Pimelea
- Species: P. virgata

Binomial name
- Pimelea virgata Meisn.

Species of shrub

Pimelea virgata is a species of small shrub, of the family Thymelaeaceae. It is native to Australia.

== Description ==
The species has an erect habit and grows 1 to 2 ft tall, with leaves 0.5 to 1 in long. It grows flowers in heads, with 8 to 10 in each head.
