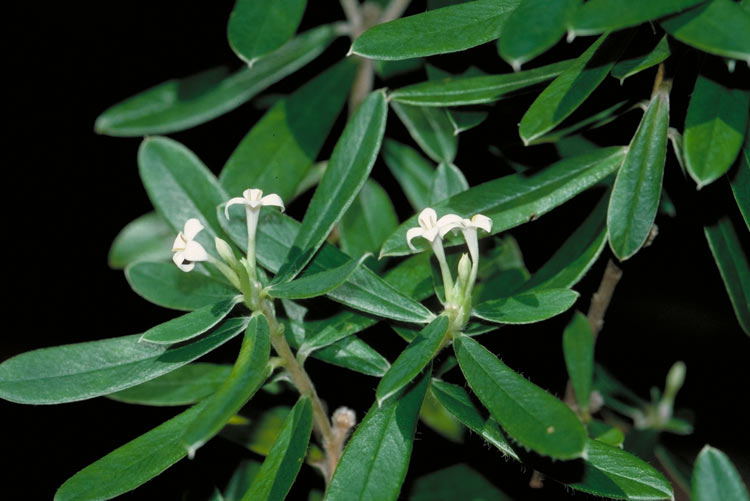

Scientific classification
- Kingdom: Plantae
- Clade: Tracheophytes
- Clade: Angiosperms
- Clade: Eudicots
- Clade: Rosids
- Order: Malvales
- Family: Thymelaeaceae
- Genus: Pimelea
- Species: P. latifolia

Binomial name
- Pimelea latifolia R.Br.

Synonyms
- Banksia latifolia (R.Br.) Kuntze nom. illeg.; Calyptrostegia latifolia (R.Br.) Endl.; Pimelea latifolia R.Br. subsp. latifolia; Pimelea latifolia R.Br var. latifolia

= Pimelea latifolia =

Species of plant

Pimelea latifolia is a species of flowering plant in the family Thymelaeaceae and is endemic to eastern Australia. It is a shrub with hairy young stems, egg-shaped leaves with the narrower end towards the base, and greenish-yellow to white, tube-shaped flowers.

== Description ==
Pimelea latifolia is a spreading shrub that typically grows to a height of 0.2–3 m (7.9 in – 9 ft 10.1 in) and has hairy young stems. Its leaves are egg-shaped with the narrower end towards the base, 31–67 mm (1.2–2.6 in) long and 13–24 mm (0.51–0.94 in) wide on a petiole, 2–19 mm (0.079–0.748 in) long. The flowers are arranged on the ends of branches in clusters of up to 18 on a peduncle usually up to 5 mm (0.20 in) long, sometimes much longer. The flowers are greenish-yellow to white, and are either bisexual or female, with leaf-like bracts at the base. The floral tube is 3.5–10 mm (0.14–0.39 in) long and the sepals 1.0–3.5 mm (0.039–0.138 in) long. Flowering mostly occurs from August to October.

== Taxonomy and naming ==
Pimelea latifolia was first formally described in 1810 by Robert Brown in Prodromus Florae Novae Hollandiae et Insulae Van Diemen. The specific epithet (latifolia) means "broad-leaved".

The Australian Plant Census accepts Pimelea latifolia subsp. altior as a synonym of P. altior, subsp. hirsuta as a synonym of P. hirsuta and subsp. elliptifolia as a synonym of Pimelea hirsuta subsp. elliptifolia.

== Distribution and habitat ==
This pimelea occurs from north of Cairns in far north Queensland to near Bowral in New South Wales.
