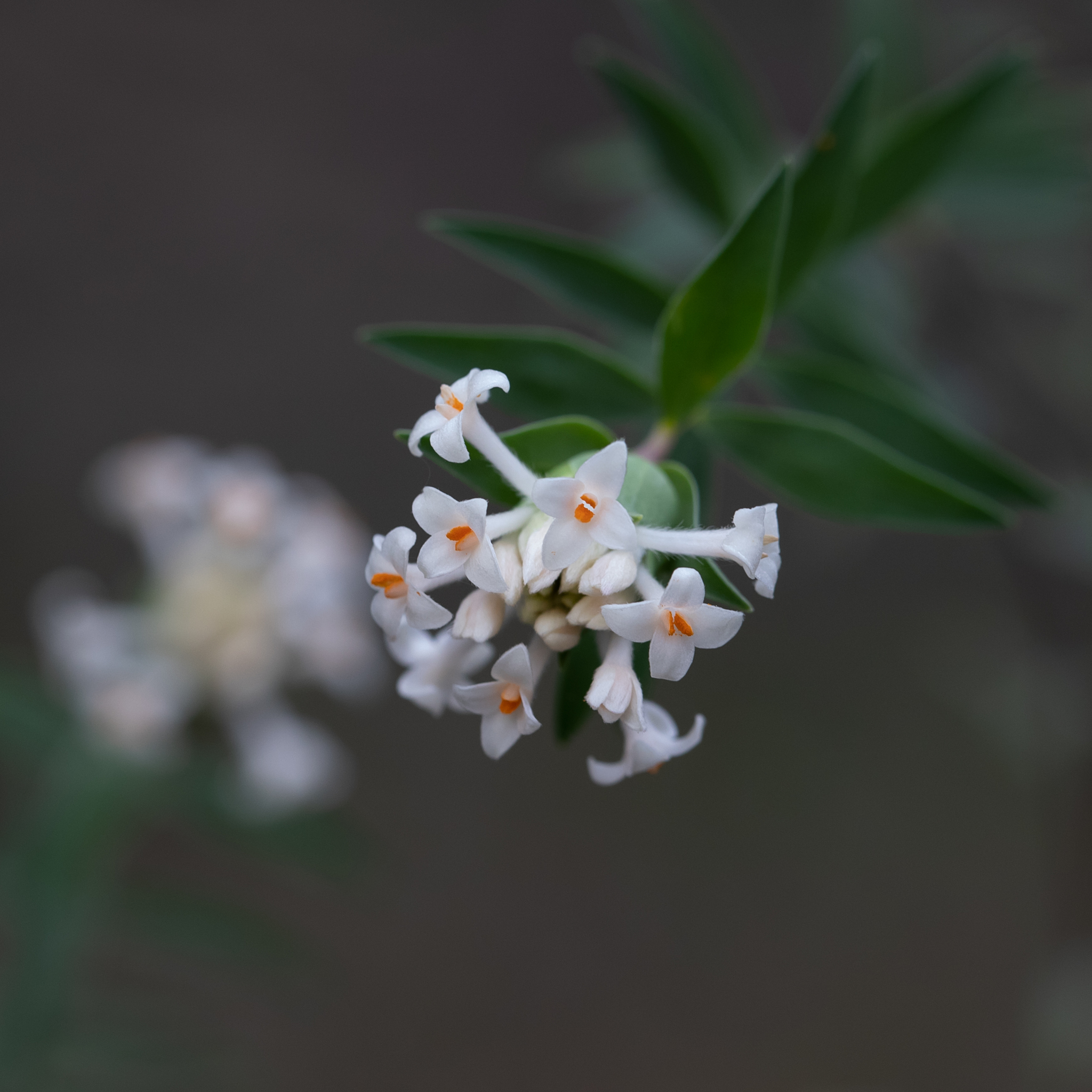
- In the Sandy Creek Conservation Park

Scientific classification
- Kingdom: Plantae
- Clade: Tracheophytes
- Clade: Angiosperms
- Clade: Eudicots
- Clade: Rosids
- Order: Malvales
- Family: Thymelaeaceae
- Genus: Pimelea
- Species: P. stricta

Binomial name
- Pimelea stricta Meisn.

Synonyms
- Banksia colorans (A.Cunn. ex Meisn.) Kuntze; Banksia stricta (Meisn.) Kuntze; Pimelea colorans A.Cunn. ex Meisn.; Pimelea colorans A.Cunn. ex Meisn. var. colorans; Pimelea stricta auct. non Meisn.: Curtis, W.M. (1967)

= Pimelea stricta =

Species of plant

Pimelea stricta, commonly known as gaunt rice-flower, is a species of flowering plant in the family Thymelaeaceae and is endemic to south-eastern continental Australia. It is an erect shrub with narrowly elliptic or linear leaves, and compact heads of densely hairy, creamy-white to yellow flowers surrounded by 4 egg-shaped involucral bracts.

== Description ==
Pimelea stricta is an erect shrub that typically grows to a height of 0.5–1.5 m (1 ft 8 in – 4 ft 11 in) and has glabrous stems. The leaves are arranged in opposite pairs and are narrowly elliptic or linear, 5–35 mm (0.20–1.38 in) long and 1.0–4.5 mm (0.039–0.177 in) wide on a short petiole. The flowers are bisexual and borne in compact clusters of many hairy, creamy-white to yellow flowers, surrounded by 4 egg-shaped involucral bracts 5–13 mm (0.20–0.51 in) and 3–9 mm (0.12–0.35 in) wide. The bracts are medium green, sometimes with a yellowish or reddish tinge. The floral tube is 7–12 mm (0.28–0.47 in) long, and the sepals are 2–4 mm (0.079–0.157 in) long. Flowering occurs in most months with a peak between August and November.

== Taxonomy ==
Pimelea stricta was first formally described in 1854 by Carl Meissner in the journal Linnaea from specimens collected in the Mount Lofty Ranges. The specific epithet, (stricta) means "straight" or "upright".

== Distribution and habitat ==
Gaunt rice-flower mainly grows in open woodland, in mallee or on hills in sandy soils, and is found from north-eastern New South Wales through Victoria to the Eyre Peninsula and Flinders Ranges in south-eastern South Australia.
