= Pimelea penicillaris =

Scientific classification
- Kingdom: Plantae
- Clade: Tracheophytes
- Clade: Angiosperms
- Clade: Eudicots
- Clade: Rosids
- Order: Malvales
- Family: Thymelaeaceae
- Genus: Pimelea
- Species: P. penicillaris

Binomial name
- Pimelea penicillaris F.Muell.

Species of shrub

Pimelea penicillaris, commonly known as sandhill riceflower, is a species of flowering plant in the family Thymelaeaceae and is endemic to Central Australia. It is an erect, dioecious shrub with densely hairy young stems, densely hairy, pale silvery green, elliptic leaves, and compact heads of white to yellow or pink flowers surrounded by 6 to 12 silky-hairy, silvery or brownish involucral bracts.

== Description ==
Pimelea penicillaris is an erect, dioecious shrub that typically grows to a height of up to 2 m (6 ft 7 in) and has its young stems covered with white, velvety hairs. The leaves are arranged alternately, elliptic to egg-shaped, sometimes with the narrower end towards the base, 4.5–19 mm (0.18–0.75 in) long and 3.0–6.5 mm (0.12–0.26 in) wide on a short petiole. Both surfaces of the leaves are densely covered with pale silvery-green hairs. The flowers are arranged in clusters of many white to yellow or pink flowers, surrounded by 6 to 12 densely silky-hairy, broadly egg-shaped or broadly elliptic, silvery or brownish involucral bracts 5–13 mm (0.20–0.51 in) long and 4.0–11.5 mm (0.16–0.45 in) wide. The floral tube is 5.5–8.0 mm (0.22–0.31 in) long, the male flowers with sepals 2–4 mm (0.079–0.157 in) long, female flowers with sepals 1.5–2.0 mm (0.059–0.079 in) long. Flowering mainly occurs from July to October.

== Taxonomy and naming ==
Pimelea penicillaris was first formally described in 1883 by Ferdinand von Mueller in The Australasian Chemist and Druggist. The specific epithet (penicillaris) means "pertaining to a small brush".

== Distribution and habitat ==
Sandhill riceflower grows in sand, often on sand dunes and is mainly found near the borders between the Northern Territory and South Australian, and between Queensland and New South Wales, in Central Australia.
