= Pimelea chlorina =

Scientific classification
- Kingdom: Plantae
- Clade: Tracheophytes
- Clade: Angiosperms
- Clade: Eudicots
- Clade: Rosids
- Order: Malvales
- Family: Thymelaeaceae
- Genus: Pimelea
- Species: P. chlorina

Binomial name
- Pimelea chlorina A.R.Bean

Species of shrub

Pimelea chlorina is a species of flowering plant in the family Thymelaeaceae and is endemic to north Queensland. It is a shrub with silvery, elliptic or egg-shaped leaves and clusters of greenish-yellow, tube-shaped flowers.

== Description ==
Pimelea chlorina is a perennial shrub that typically grows to a height of 0.5–1.5 m (1 ft 8 in – 4 ft 11 in) and has shiny, densely hairy young stems. The leaves are arranged alternately along the stems, elliptic or egg-shaped with the narrower end towards the base, 12–26 mm (0.47–1.02 in) long and 4.5–11.5 mm (0.18–0.45 in) wide, on a petiole 0.8–1.4 mm (0.031–0.055 in) long. The leaves are covered with long, silky, silvery hairs. The flowers are borne on the side of the stems in clusters of 15 to 45 on a rachis 3–9 mm (0.12–0.35 in) long, each flower on a pedicel 0.7–0.8 mm (0.028–0.031 in) long. The floral tube is 4.3–6 mm (0.17–0.24 in) long and greenish-yellow, the sepals 1.0–1.6 mm (0.039–0.063 in) long and densely hairy on the outside. Flowering occurs in most months.

== Taxonomy ==
Pimelea chlorina was first formally described in 2017 by Anthony Bean in the journal Austrobaileya from specimens he collected in 2016. The specific epithet (chlorina) means pale green or greenish yellow, and refers to the colour of the flowers.

== Distribution and habitat ==
This pimelea occurs in scattered populations between Mount Carbine and Charters Towers in north Queensland, where it usually grows on hillsides in soil derived from granite.
