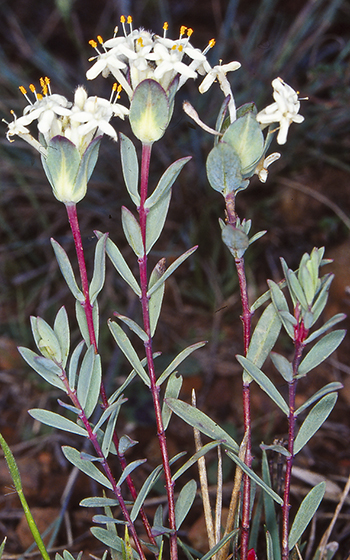
- Flowers

Scientific classification
- Kingdom: Plantae
- Clade: Tracheophytes
- Clade: Angiosperms
- Clade: Eudicots
- Clade: Rosids
- Order: Malvales
- Family: Thymelaeaceae
- Genus: Pimelea
- Species: P. glauca

Binomial name
- Pimelea glauca R.Br.

= Pimelea glauca =

Species of shrub

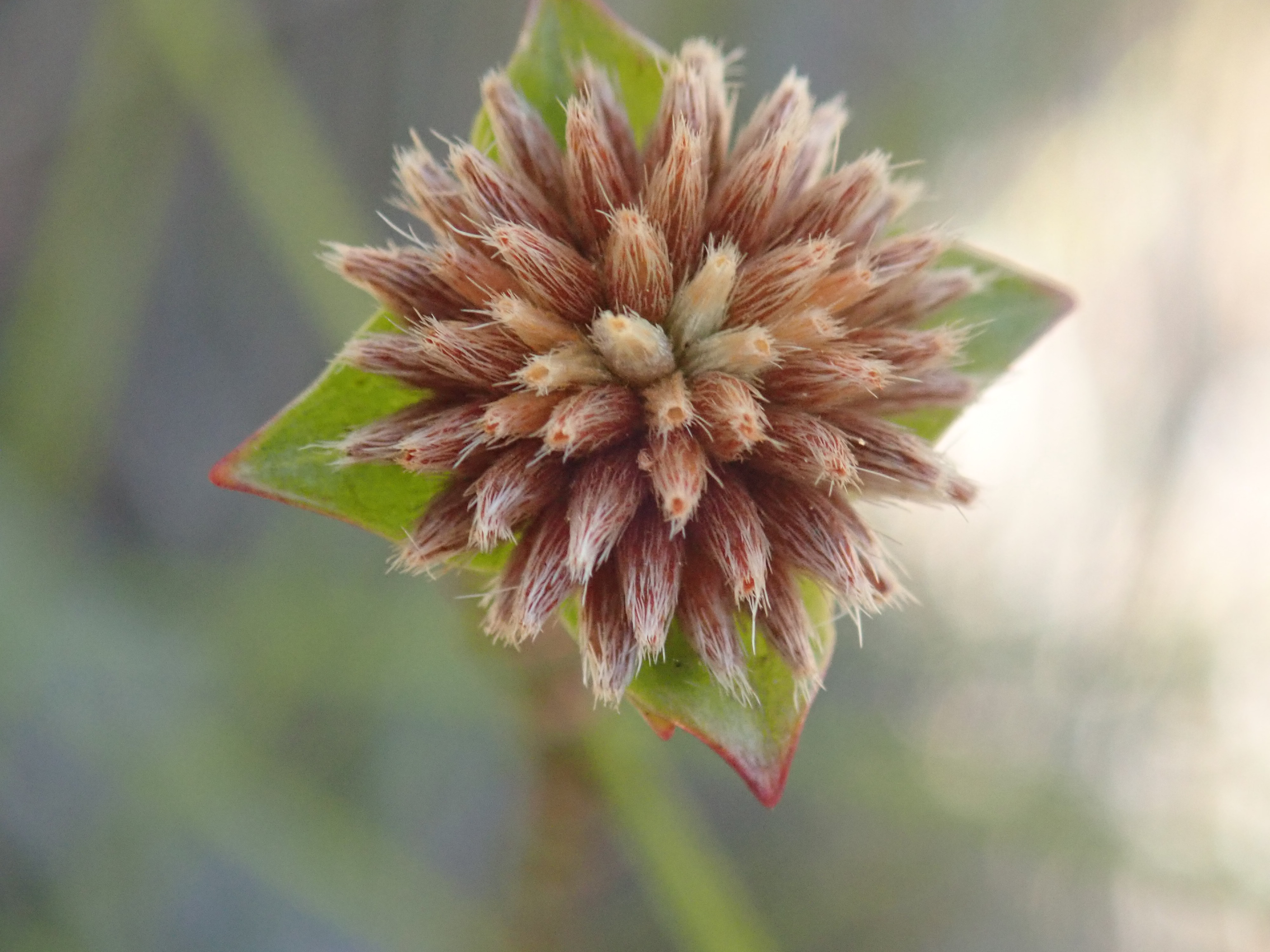
Fruit

Pimelea glauca, commonly known as smooth riceflower, is a species of flowering plant in the family Thymelaeaceae and is endemic to eastern Australia. It has elliptic to more or less lance-shaped or linear leaves and creamy-white flowers arranged in heads of seven or more on the ends of the stems, with four lance-shaped to egg-shaped bracts at the base of the inflorescence.

== Description ==
Pimelea glauca is a much-branched shrub that typically grows to a height of up to 1 m (3 ft 3 in) and has glabrous stems. The leaves are narrowly elliptic to lance-shaped or linear, 3–15 mm (0.12–0.59 in) long and 1–6 mm (0.039–0.236 in) wide ending with a short, downward curving, sharp point. The inflorescence consists of 7 to 35 creamy-white tube-shaped flowers 8–14 mm (0.31–0.55 in) long arranged in dense clusters at the ends of the branches. The clusters are surrounded by 4 lance-shaped to egg-shaped involucral bracts 6–16 mm (0.24–0.63 in) long and 2–8 mm (0.079–0.315 in) wide. The bracts are smooth on the outside, hairy on the inside and have fringed edges. Flowering mainly occurs from August to December and the fruit is about 4 mm (0.16 in) long. The plant is toxic to livestock.

== Taxonomy and naming ==
Pimelea glauca was first formally described in 1810 by Robert Brown in the Prodromus Florae Novae Hollandiae et Insulae Van Diemen. The specific epithet glauca is from the Latin word glaucus meaning having bluish-grey or green colour, referring to the leaves of this species.

== Distribution and habitat ==
Smooth riceflower grows in open forest, grassland, coastal heath and on dunes, in sandy soil. It is found in Queensland, New South Wales, the Australian Capital Territory, Victoria, South Australia and Tasmania. It is widespread in N.S.W., the A.C.T., Victoria and Tasmania. In South Australia it occurs in the south-east of the state, including on the Eyre and Yorke Peninsulas, and on Kangaroo Island.
