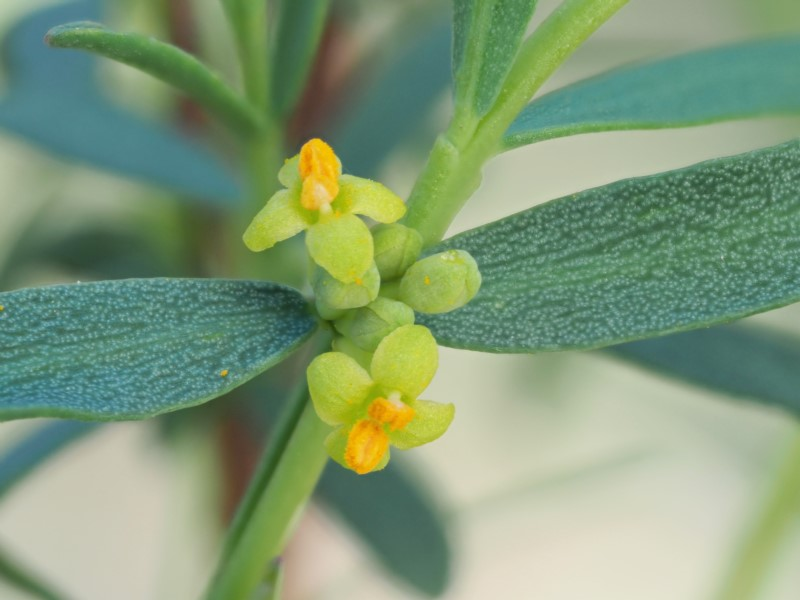

Scientific classification
- Kingdom: Plantae
- Clade: Tracheophytes
- Clade: Angiosperms
- Clade: Eudicots
- Clade: Rosids
- Order: Malvales
- Family: Thymelaeaceae
- Genus: Pimelea
- Species: P. pauciflora

Binomial name
- Pimelea pauciflora R.Br.

= Pimelea pauciflora =

Poison rice-flower

Species of shrub

Pimelea pauciflora, commonly known as poison rice-flower, is a species of shrub in the family Thymelaeaceae. It has small yellow-lime flowers and green, smooth fleshy leaves, and is endemic to Eastern Australia.

== Description ==
Pimelea pauciflora is a small dioecious shrub that typically grows to a height of 1–3 m (3 ft 3 in – 9 ft 10 in) and has smooth, long, reddish stems. The leaves are arranged in opposite pairs along the branches, and are glossy green, smooth, and narrowly linear or linear to lance shaped, 4–25 mm (0.16–0.98 in) long, 1–4 mm (0.039–0.157 in) wide on a short petiole. The flowers are yellowish-green and arranged in clusters of 3 to 9, mostly at the end of branches usually surrounded by 2 green, narrowly elliptic to egg-shaped involucral bracts. The flowers are smooth and unisexual, the male flowers 1–3 mm (0.039–0.118 in) long, and the female flowers about 3 mm (0.12 in) long. The leaf-like overlapping flower bracts, usually 2, egg-shaped to narrow elliptic, 3–11 mm (0.12–0.43 in) long, 2–5 mm (0.079–0.197 in) wide, smooth and green. The fruit is a succulent red berry, about 4 mm (0.16 in) wide and as the fruit develop the sepals and petals fall off. Flowering occurs from September to November.

== Taxonomy and naming ==
Pimelea pauciflora was first formally described in 1810 by Robert Brown and the description was published in Prodromus Florae Novae Hollandiae et Insulae Van Diemen. The specific epithet (pauciflora) is from the Latin pauci- meaning "few" and -florus meaning "flowered".

== Distribution and habitat ==
Poison rice-flower is found growing in open scrubland, forests, sometimes in dense thickets at higher altitudes south from Queanbeyan in New South Wales. In Victoria it grows near mountain streams in a few scattered locations. It also occurs in a few places in north-eastern Tasmania.
