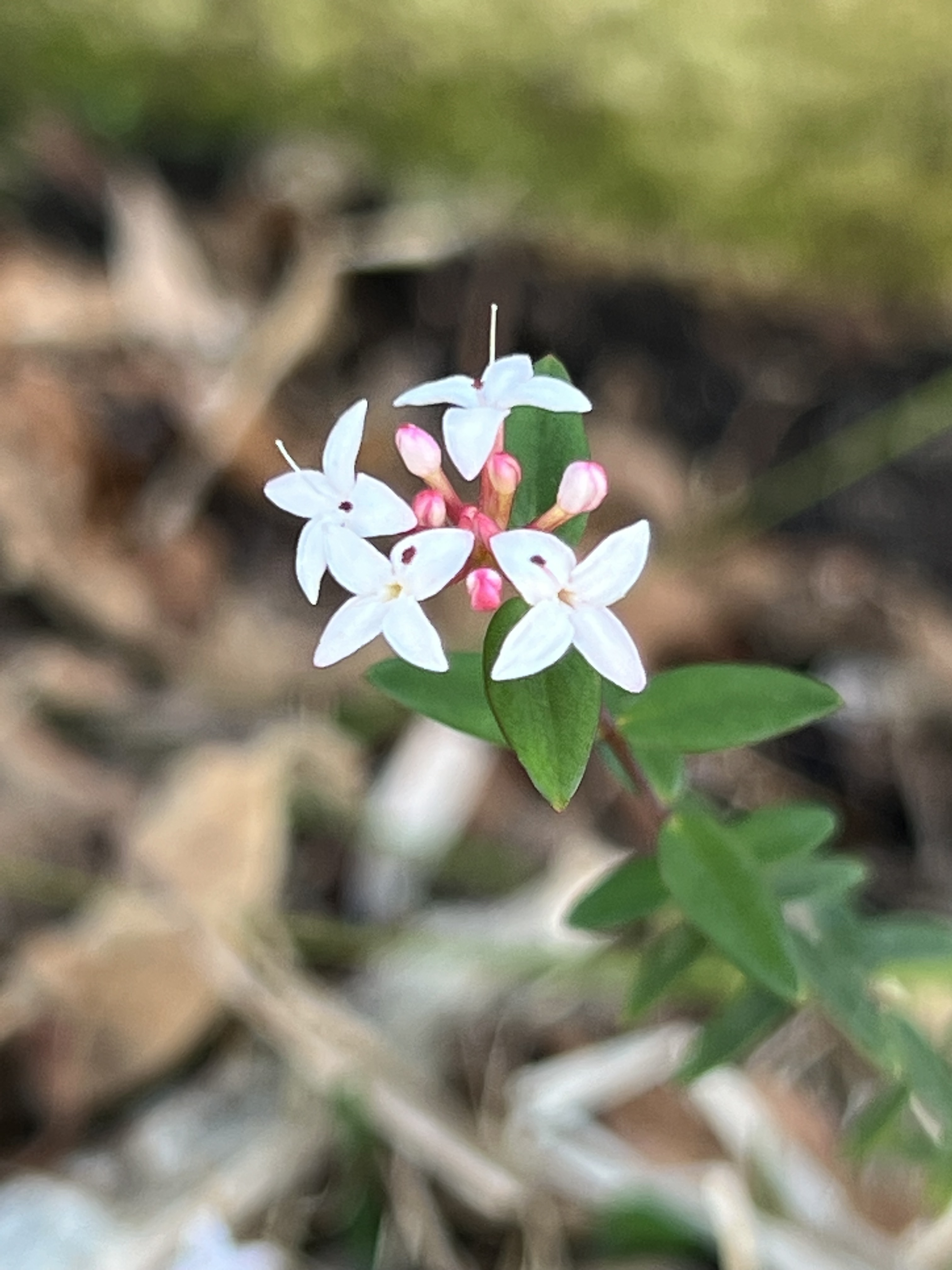

Scientific classification
- Kingdom: Plantae
- Clade: Tracheophytes
- Clade: Angiosperms
- Clade: Eudicots
- Clade: Rosids
- Order: Malvales
- Family: Thymelaeaceae
- Genus: Pimelea
- Species: P. filiformis

Binomial name
- Pimelea filiformis Hook.f.

Synonyms
- Banksia filiformis (Hook.f.) Kuntze

= Pimelea filiformis =

Species of flowering plant

Pimelea filiformis, commonly known as trailing rice flower, is a species of flowering plant in the family Thymelaeaceae and is endemic to Tasmania. It is a prostrate or semi-prostrate undershrub with narrowly elliptic or elliptic leaves and clusters of more or less glabrous, pink or white flowers.

== Description ==
Pimelea filiformis is a prostrate or semi-prostrate undershrub with glabrous stems. The leaves are arranged in opposite pairs, narrowly elliptic or elliptic, mostly 3–11 mm (0.12–0.43 in) long, 1–6 mm (0.039–0.236 in) wide and more or less sessile, the lower surface paler than the upper one. The flowers are more or less glabrous, arranged in clusters on the ends of branches, and lack involucral bracts. The floral tube is deep pink and 3.5–5 mm (0.14–0.20 in) long and the sepals white or pink and 2–3 mm (0.079–0.118 in) long. Flowering occurs from November to January.

== Taxonomy ==
Pimelea filiformis was first formally described in 1847 by Joseph Dalton Hooker in the London Journal of Botany from specimens near Launceston. The specific epithet (filiformis) means "thread-shaped".

== Distribution and habitat ==
This pimelea grows on plains in shrubby forest near Launceston in northern and north-eastern Tasmania. It often forms flat clumps and is often found trailing through other vegetation.

== Conservation status ==
Pimelea filiformis is listed as "rare" in the Tasmanian Government Threatened Species Protection Act 1995.
