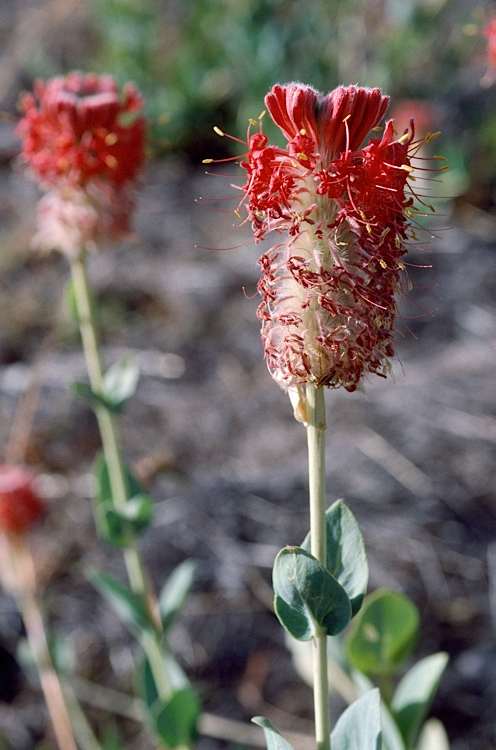
- Pimelea decora

Scientific classification
- Kingdom: Plantae
- Clade: Tracheophytes
- Clade: Angiosperms
- Clade: Eudicots
- Clade: Rosids
- Order: Malvales
- Family: Thymelaeaceae
- Genus: Pimelea
- Species: P. decora

Binomial name
- Pimelea decora Domin

= Pimelea decora =

Flinders poppy

Species of shrub

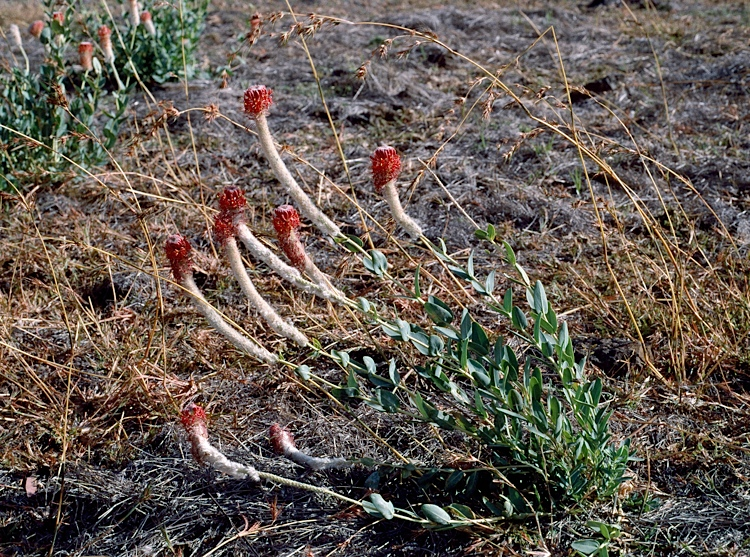
Habit near Hughenden

Pimelea decora, commonly known as Flinders poppy, is a species of flowering plant in the family Thymelaeaceae and is native to central Queensland. It is a woody perennial herb with egg-shaped or elliptic leaves and hairy, red and cream-coloured flowers.

== Description ==
Pimelea decora is a woody, perennial that typically grows to a height of 0.3–1 m (1 ft 0 in – 3 ft 3 in) with many stems at the base. The leaves are usually arranged in opposite pairs, usually egg-shaped or elliptic, 15–55 mm (0.59–2.17 in) long, 6–38 mm (0.24–1.50 in) wide and glaucous. The flowers are arranged in clusters on a rachis usually 150–220 mm (5.9–8.7 in) long with 5 to 8 hairy involucral bracts but that fall off as the flowers open. The flowers are densely hairy, and red with a cream-coloured base, the floral tube 14–17 mm (0.55–0.67 in) long. The sepals are 5–7 mm (0.20–0.28 in) long and the stamens are much longer than the sepals. Flowering occurs throughout the year.

== Taxonomy ==
Pimelea decora was first formally described in 1928 by Karel Domin in his Bibliotheca Botanica, from specimens he collected near Hughenden in 1910. The specific epithet (decora) means "beautiful".

== Distribution and habitat ==
Flinders poppy grows in grassland, often in rocky soil and is found in central Queensland, mainly south-east of Hughenden. Domin noted that the species is very poisonous to livestock.
