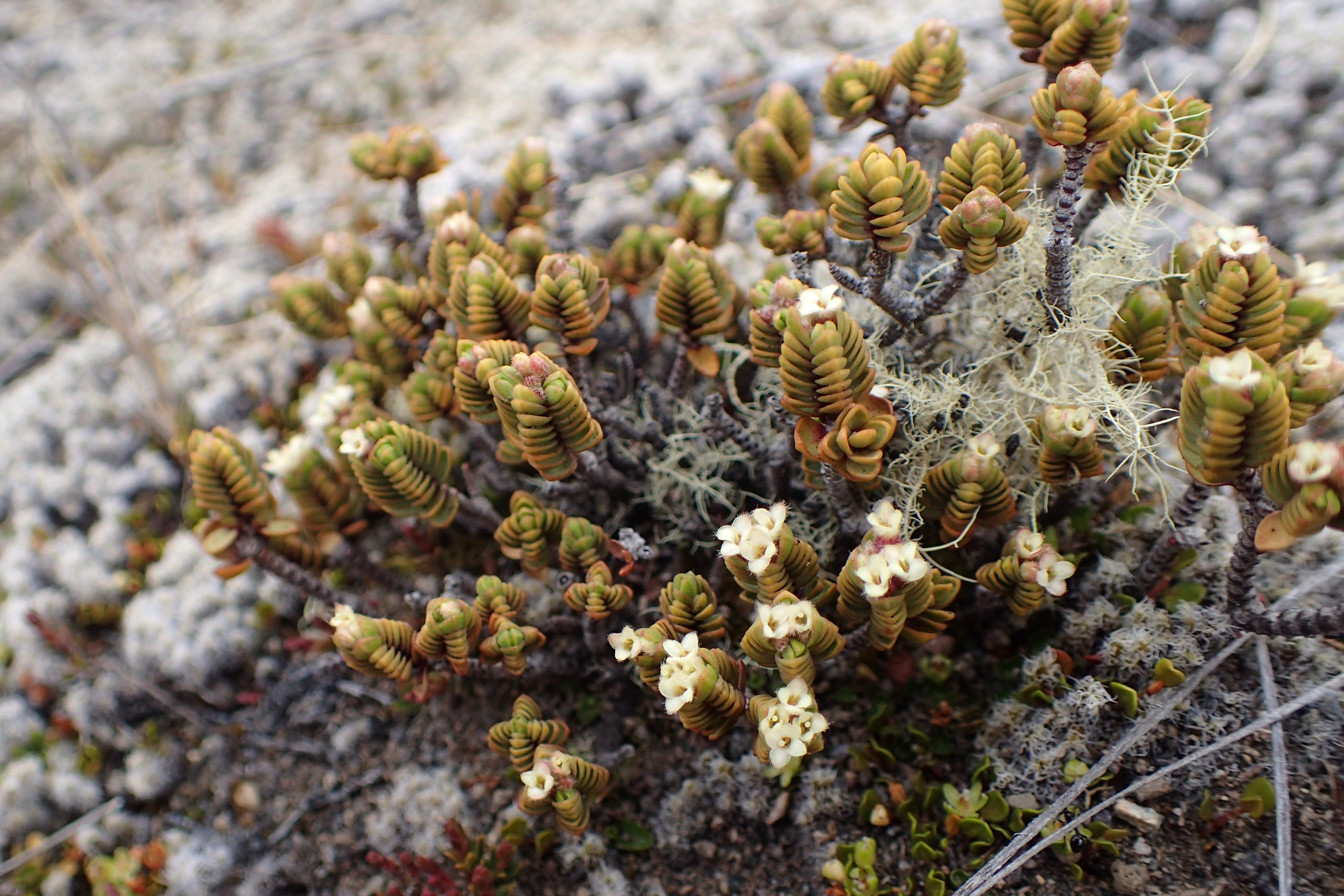

Scientific classification
- Kingdom: Plantae
- Clade: Tracheophytes
- Clade: Angiosperms
- Clade: Eudicots
- Clade: Rosids
- Order: Malvales
- Family: Thymelaeaceae
- Genus: Pimelea
- Species: P. microphylla

Binomial name
- Pimelea microphylla Colenso

= Pimelea microphylla =

Species of plant

Pimelea microphylla is a species of small plant that is native to New Zealand.

== Description ==
A small plant that forms large mats, with small white flowers.

== Range ==
Endemic to the North Island of New Zealand.

== Ecology ==
This species is severely at risk of habitat loss, due to incursions by Common Heather in its native range.
