= Pimelea drummondii =

Scientific classification
- Kingdom: Plantae
- Clade: Tracheophytes
- Clade: Angiosperms
- Clade: Eudicots
- Clade: Rosids
- Order: Malvales
- Family: Thymelaeaceae
- Genus: Pimelea
- Species: P. drummondii

Binomial name
- Pimelea drummondii Rye

Species of flowering plant

Pimelea drummondii is a species of flowering plant in the family Thymelaeaceae and is endemic to near-coastal areas of southern Western Australia. It is an erect, slender shrub with narrowly elliptic or elliptic leaves arranged in opposite pairs, and white or cream-coloured flowers surrounded by 3 or 4 pairs of pale green to yellowish involucral bracts.

== Description ==
Pimelea drummondii is an erect, slender shrub that typically grows to a height of 0.4–2 m (1 ft 4 in – 6 ft 7 in) and has glabrous stems. The leaves are arranged in opposite pairs, narrowly elliptic to elliptic, 10–48 mm (0.39–1.89 in) long and 4.5–18 mm (0.18–0.71 in) wide. The flowers are arranged in large, compact clusters usually with 3, 4 more pairs of pale green or yellow-green, sometimes partly reddish, egg-shaped involucral bracts 11–21 mm (0.43–0.83 in) long and 7–18 mm (0.28–0.71 in) wide. Each flower is bisexual, white or cream-coloured and glabrous inside, the flower tube 19–27 mm (0.75–1.06 in) long. The sepals are 4–5 mm (0.16–0.20 in) long, the stamens slightly longer than the sepals. Flowering mainly occurs from June to August.

== Taxonomy ==
This species was first formally described in 1852 by Nikolai Turczaninow who gave it the name Calyptrostegia drummondii in the Bulletin de la Société Impériale des Naturalistes de Moscou from specimens collected by James Drummond. In 1988, Barbara Lynette Rye changed the name to Pimelea drummondii in the journal Nuytsia. The specific epithet (drummondii) honours the collector of the type specimens.

== Distribution and habitat ==
Pimelea drummondii grows in sandy soil on coastal sand dunes or in sandy soil over granite between Mount Gardner and Israelite Bay in near-coastal areas of the Esperance Plains, Jarrah Forest and Mallee bioregions of southern Western Australia.

== Conservation status ==
This pimelea is listed as "not threatened" by the Government of Western Australia Department of Biodiversity, Conservation and Attractions.
