= Pimelea rupestris =

Scientific classification
- Kingdom: Plantae
- Clade: Tracheophytes
- Clade: Angiosperms
- Clade: Eudicots
- Clade: Rosids
- Order: Malvales
- Family: Thymelaeaceae
- Genus: Pimelea
- Species: P. rupestris

Binomial name
- Pimelea rupestris A.R.Bean

Species of shrub

Pimelea rupestris is a species of flowering plant in the family Thymelaeaceae and is endemic to eastern Australia. It is a shrub with hairy young stems, elliptic to egg-shaped leaves with the narrower end towards the base, and heads of white flowers that are either all male or all female.

== Description ==
Pimelea rupestris is a shrub that typically grows to a height of 0.5–1 m (1 ft 8 in – 3 ft 3 in) and has hairy young stems, the hairs pressed against the stem. The leaves are arranged alternately along the stems, elliptic to egg-shaped with the narrower end towards the base, 10–29 mm (0.39–1.14 in) long and 4.5–9 mm (0.18–0.35 in) wide, on a petiole 1.3–2.3 mm (0.051–0.091 in) long. The upper surface of the leaves is more or less glabrous and the lower surface sparsely hairy. The flowers are borne in leaf axils in heads of 40 to 80 on a peduncle up to 1.5 mm (0.059 in) long, each flower on a pedicel 0.2–0.3 mm (0.0079–0.0118 in) long. All the flowers on a plant are either all male or all female, the floral tube 3.0–4.4 mm (0.12–0.17 in) long and white, the sepal lobes 1.5–2.2 mm (0.059–0.087 in) long and densely hairy on the outside. Flowering has been observed from January to March and in September.

== Taxonomy ==
Pimelea rupestris was first formally described in 2017 by Anthony Bean in the journal Austrobaileya from specimens he collected on Widgee Mountain, west of Gympie in 2009. The specific epithet (rupestris) means "of rocks" or "living in rocky places", referring to the habitat of the species.

== Distribution and habitat ==
This pimelea grows in rocky outcrops with serpentinite on hills and mountainous places and is only known from the type location in Queensland, and Fine Flower and Wave Hill station in northern New South Wales.
