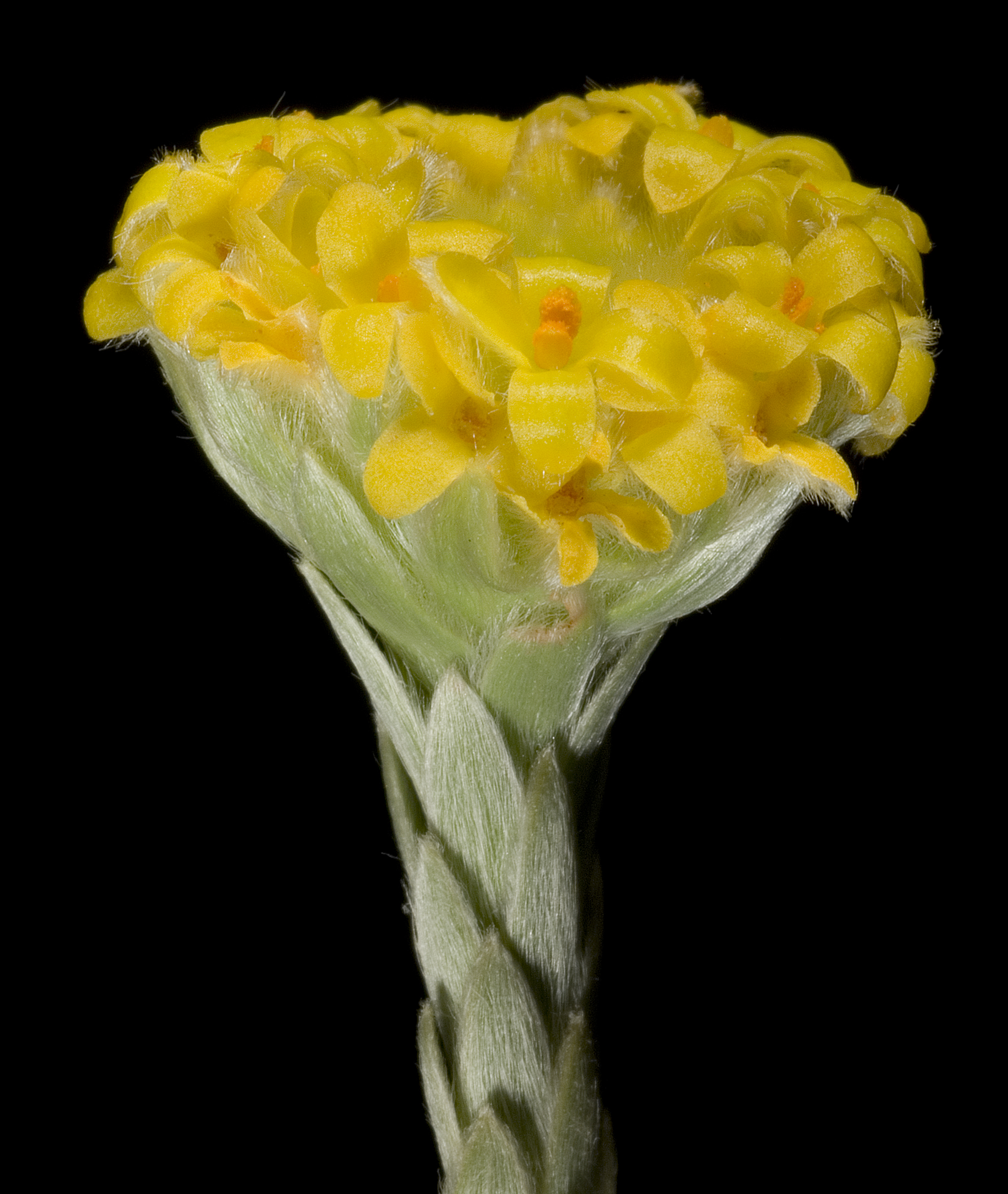

Scientific classification
- Kingdom: Plantae
- Clade: Tracheophytes
- Clade: Angiosperms
- Clade: Eudicots
- Clade: Rosids
- Order: Malvales
- Family: Thymelaeaceae
- Genus: Pimelea
- Species: P. ammocharis

Binomial name
- Pimelea ammocharis F.Muell.

= Pimelea ammocharis =

Species of shrub

Pimelea ammocharis is a species of small shrub in the family Thymelaeaceae. It is a small shrub with white-yellow to orange flowers and is endemic to Western Australia.

== Description ==
Pimelea ammocharis is a small, upright shrub 0.2–1.8 m (7.9 in – 5 ft 10.9 in) high with new growth stems densely hairy. The leaves are arranged alternately, with a short leaf stalk, narrowly elliptic to egg-shaped or linear, 4–17 mm (0.16–0.67 in) long, 1–5 mm (0.039–0.197 in) wide and light silvery green throughout. The inflorescence may be either pendulous or upright, usually in a tight head of numerous tubular white to deep yellow to orange flowers 5.5–11 mm (0.22–0.43 in) long. The flowers are smooth on the inside and thickly hairy on the outside and the sepals 1.5–4 mm (0.059–0.157 in) long. The male flowers are mostly evenly hairy or hairs slightly longer near the base. The female or bisexual flowers remain or sporadically tear above the fruit, they are covered with hairs 7–9 mm (0.28–0.35 in) long near the base, considerably shorter at the apex. Flowering occurs from March to October.

== Taxonomy and naming ==
Pimelea ammocharis was first formally described in 1857 by Ferdinand von Mueller and the description was published in Hooker's Journal of Botany and Kew Garden Miscellany. The specific epithet (ammocharis) is derived from ammos meaning "sand" and charis meaning "grace".

== Distribution and habitat ==
This species occurs from the southern part of the Kimberley to the Kennedy-Blackstone Range and east to central Northern Territory usually along watercourses or red sandy soil and rocky outcrops in dryer regions.
