= Pimelea lanata =

Scientific classification
- Kingdom: Plantae
- Clade: Tracheophytes
- Clade: Angiosperms
- Clade: Eudicots
- Clade: Rosids
- Order: Malvales
- Family: Thymelaeaceae
- Genus: Pimelea
- Species: P. lanata

Binomial name
- Pimelea lanata R.Br.

Synonyms
- Calyptrostegia lanata (R.Br.) Endl.; Pimelea hispida var. lanata (R.Br.) Diels & E.Pritz.

Species of shrub

Pimelea lanata is a species of flowering plant in the family Thymelaeaceae and is endemic to the southwest of Western Australia. It is a shrub with narrowly elliptic leaves and erect clusters of white to deep pink flowers surrounded by 4, mostly green, involucral bracts.

== Description ==
Pimelea lanata is an erect, spindly shrub that typically grows to a height of 0.7–4 m (2 ft 4 in – 13 ft 1 in) and has a single stem at ground level. The leaves are narrowly elliptic, usually 9–25 mm (0.35–0.98 in) long and 2–10 mm (0.079–0.394 in) wide and sessile, or on a petiole up to 1.3 mm (0.051 in) long. The flowers are arranged in erect clusters, surrounded by 4 mostly green involucral bracts that are 6–13 mm (0.24–0.51 in) long, 4–8 mm (0.16–0.31 in) wide, each flower on a pedicel 0.3–1 mm (0.012–0.039 in) long. The floral tube is 7.0–10.5 mm (0.28–0.41 in) long, the sepals 2.5–3.5 mm (0.098–0.138 in) long, and the stamens are longer than the sepals. Flowering occurs mainly from December to February.

== Taxonomy ==
Pimelea lanata was first formally described in 1810 by Robert Brown in his book Prodromus Florae Novae Hollandiae et Insulae Van Diemen. The specific epithet (lanata) means "woolly".

== Distribution and habitat ==
This pimelea grows in winter-wet places on near-coastal plains between Perth and Albany in the Jarrah Forest, Swan Coastal Plain and Warren bioregions of south-western Western Australia.

== Conservation status ==
Pimelea lanata is listed as "not threatened" by the Government of Western Australia Department of Biodiversity, Conservation and Attractions.
