= Pimelea cinerea =

Scientific classification
- Kingdom: Plantae
- Clade: Tracheophytes
- Clade: Angiosperms
- Clade: Eudicots
- Clade: Rosids
- Order: Malvales
- Family: Thymelaeaceae
- Genus: Pimelea
- Species: P. cinerea

Binomial name
- Pimelea cinerea R.Br.

Synonyms
- Banksia cinerea (R.Br.) Kuntze; Pimelea gunnii Hook.f.

Species of shrub

Pimelea cinerea is a species of flowering plant in the family Thymelaeaceae and is endemic to Tasmania. It is a slender shrub with more or less elliptic leaves, and heads of white flowers surrounded by leaves.

== Description ==
Pimelea cinerea is a slender shrub that typically grows to a height of 1–2.5 m (3 ft 3 in – 8 ft 2 in), the stems densely hairy but with few branches. The leaves are arranged in opposite pairs, elliptic to narrowly elliptic or oblong, 5–24 mm (0.20–0.94 in) long and 2–8 mm (0.079–0.315 in) wide on a short petiole. The flowers are borne in few-flowered heads surrounded by 2, 4 or 6 bract-like leaves, and are bisexual, white and hairy on a hairy pedicel, the floral tube 4.0–4.5 mm (0.16–0.18 in) long and the sepals about 1.5 mm (0.059 in) long. Flowering occurs from November to January.

== Taxonomy and naming ==
Pimelea cinerea was first formally described in 1810 by Robert Brown in his book Prodromus Florae Novae Hollandiae et Insulae Van Diemen. The specific epithet (cinerea) means "ash-coloured" or "grey".

== Distribution and habitat ==
This pimelea grows in forest in the south and west of Tasmania, mainly at altitudes between 500 and 1,000 m (1,600 and 3,300 ft).
