= Pimelea halophila =

Conservation status
- Priority Two — Poorly Known Taxa (DEC)

Scientific classification
- Kingdom: Plantae
- Clade: Tracheophytes
- Clade: Angiosperms
- Clade: Eudicots
- Clade: Rosids
- Order: Malvales
- Family: Thymelaeaceae
- Genus: Pimelea
- Species: P. halophila

Binomial name
- Pimelea halophila Rye

Species of flowering plant

Pimelea halophila is a species of flowering plant in the family Thymelaeaceae and is endemic to the southwest of Western Australia. It is an undershrub with elliptic leaves and compact clusters of 4 to 20 cream-coloured or white flowers surrounded by 3 or 4 green involucral bracts, and grows on islands in salt lakes.

== Description ==
Pimelea halophila is an undershrub that typically grows to a height of 15–150 mm (0.59–5.91 in) and often forms a cushion. The leaves are arranged alternately, elliptic to almost circular, 0.4–3.2 mm (0.016–0.126 in) long, 0.4–1.5 mm (0.016–0.059 in) wide on a petiole up to 0.3 mm (0.012 in) long. The flowers are arranged on the ends of branches in compact clusters of 4 to 20 on a peduncle about 0.5 mm (0.020 in) long. The clusters are surrounded by 3 or 4 involucral bracts that are yellowish-green, each flower on a hairy pedicel 0.2–0.4 mm (0.0079–0.0157 in) long. The flower tube of male flowers is 2.0–2.5 mm (0.079–0.098 in) long and the sepals 1.0–1.3 mm (0.039–0.051 in) long, and in female flowers the flower tube is 1.5–1.7 mm (0.059–0.067 in) long, the sepals 0.6–0.7 mm (0.024–0.028 in) long. The stamens in male flowers are shorter than the sepals and the female style extends 1 mm (0.039 in) beyond the end of the flower tube. Flowering occurs from August to October.

== Taxonomy ==
Pimelea halophila was first formally described in 1988 by Barbara Lynette Rye and the description was published in the journal Nuytsia from specimens she collected near a Lake King salt lake. The specific epithet (halophila) means "salt loving".

== Distribution and habitat ==
This pimelea grows in saline sand on islands raised slightly above the level of a salt lake in the Coolgardie and Mallee bioregions of south-western Western Australia.

== Conservation status ==
Pimelea halophila is listed as "Priority Two" by the Western Australian Government Department of Biodiversity, Conservation and Attractions, meaning that it is poorly known and from only one or a few locations.
