= Pimelea micrantha =

Scientific classification
- Kingdom: Plantae
- Clade: Tracheophytes
- Clade: Angiosperms
- Clade: Eudicots
- Clade: Rosids
- Order: Malvales
- Family: Thymelaeaceae
- Genus: Pimelea
- Species: P. micrantha

Binomial name
- Pimelea micrantha F.Muell. ex Meisn.

Synonyms
- Pimelea curviflora subsp. micrantha (Meisn.) Threlfall; Pimelea curviflora var. micrantha (F.Muell. ex Meisn.) Benth.

Species of plant

Pimelea micrantha, commonly known as silky rice-flower is a species of flowering plant in the family Thymelaeaceae and is endemic to southern Australia. It is a much-branched undershrub with narrowly elliptic to lance-shaped leaves and compact clusters or heads of densely hairy, creamy white flowers.

== Description ==
Pimelea micrantha is a much-branched shrub that typically grows to a height of 10–40 cm (3.9–15.7 in) and has densely hairy stems. Its leaves are narrowly elliptic to lance-shaped with the narrower end towards the base, 1–11 mm (0.039–0.433 in) long and 0.8–4.5 mm (0.031–0.177 in) wide, on a short petiole. The flowers are borne in leaf axils or on the ends of branches in compact clusters or heads of 3 to 13 flowers on a peduncle about 1.5 mm (0.059 in) long with leaf-like involucral bracts at the base. The flowers are creamy-white and densely hairy on the outside, the floral tube 2.5–3 mm (0.098–0.118 in) long. Flowering mainly occurs from August to December and the fruit contains a pear-shaped nut.

== Taxonomy ==
Pimelea micrantha was first formally described in 1854 by Carl Meissner in the journal Linnaea from an unpublished description by Ferdinand von Mueller, of specimens collected by Hans Hermann Behr. The specific epithet (micrantha) means "small-flowered".

== Distribution and habitat ==
Silky rice-flower grows in sandy or clayey soil, often in rocky areas south from Manilla in inland New South Wales, in scattered populations in northern Victoria and southern Western Australia, and on Flinders Island and the Midlands of Tasmania.
