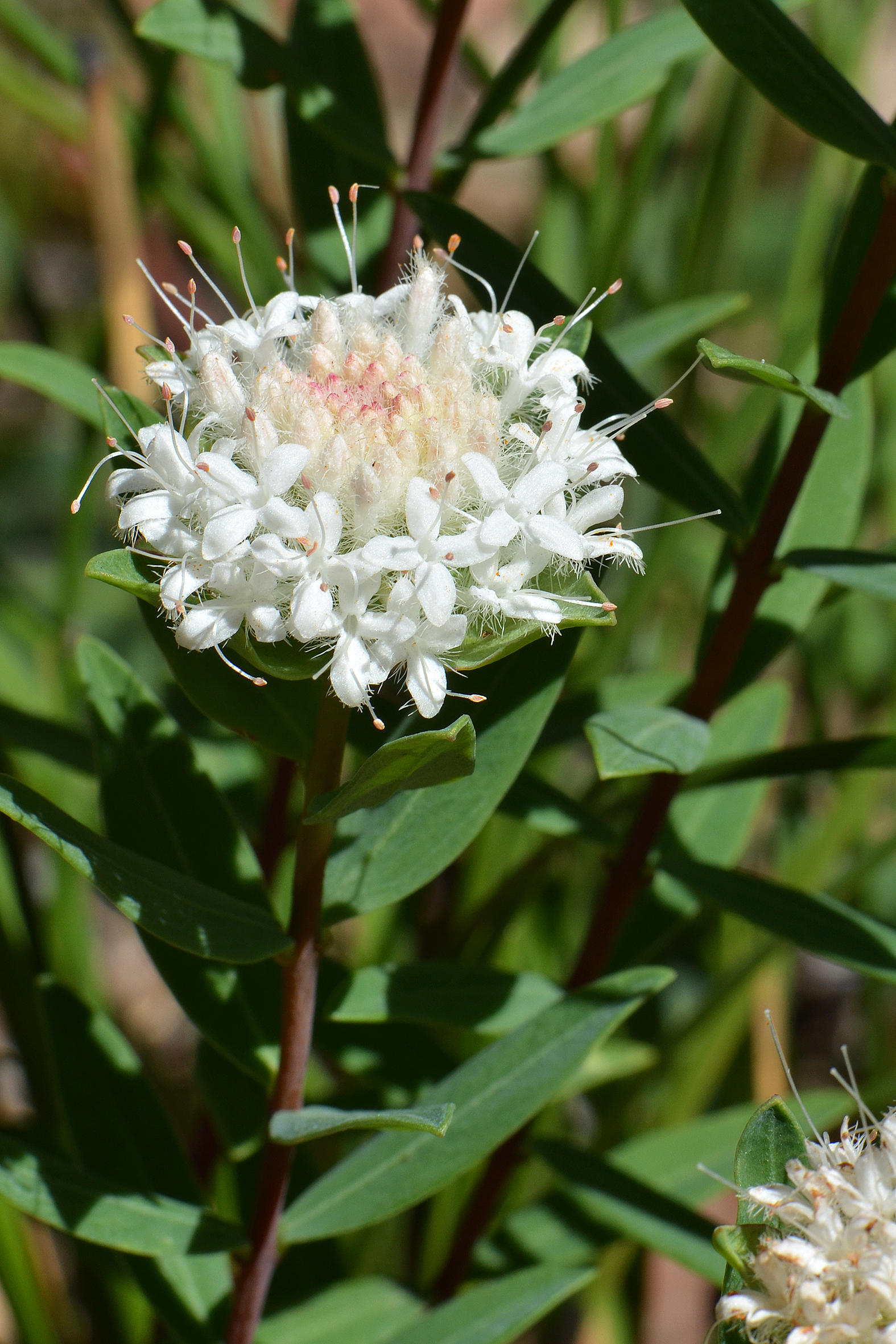

Conservation status
- Priority Four — Rare Taxa (DEC)

Scientific classification
- Kingdom: Plantae
- Clade: Tracheophytes
- Clade: Angiosperms
- Clade: Eudicots
- Clade: Rosids
- Order: Malvales
- Family: Thymelaeaceae
- Genus: Pimelea
- Species: P. rara

Binomial name
- Pimelea rara Rye

= Pimelea rara =

Species of flowering plant

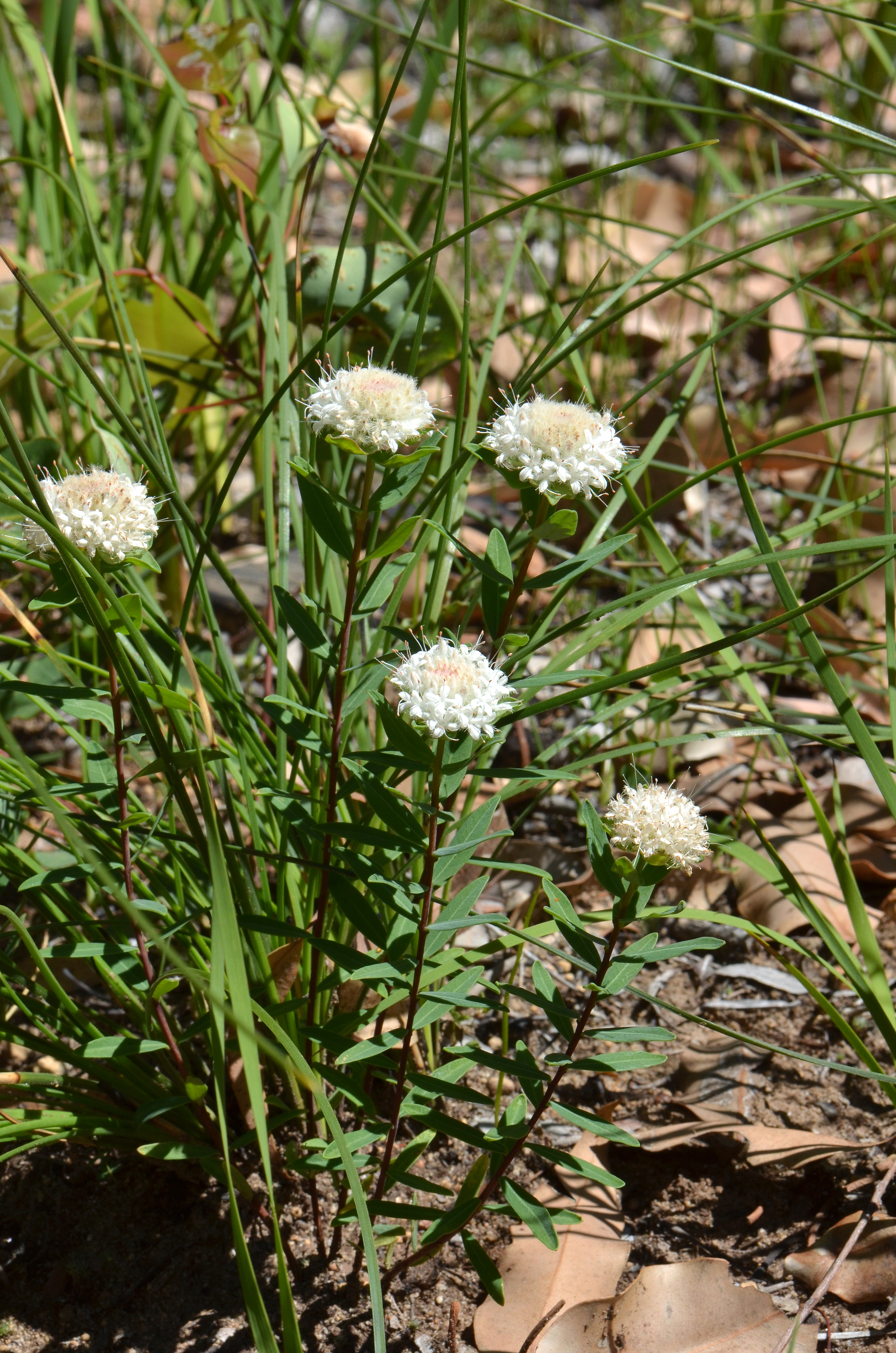
Habit

Pimelea rara, commonly known as summertime pimelea, is a species of flowering plant in the family Thymelaeaceae and is endemic to the southwest of Western Australia. It is a shrub with elliptic or egg-shaped leaves, the narrower end towards the base, and heads of white flowers surrounded by 4 broadly egg-shaped involucral bracts.

== Description ==
Pimelea rara is a shrub that typically grows to a height of 20–35 cm (7.9–13.8 in) and has a single stem at the base. The leaves are elliptic or egg-shaped with the narrower end towards the base, 15–30 mm (0.59–1.18 in) long and about 8 mm (0.31 in) wide on a short petiole. The flowers are arranged in heads surrounded 4 broadly egg-shaped involucral bracts 9–20 mm (0.35–0.79 in) long and about 8 mm (0.31 in) wide, each flower on a pedicel about 0.6 mm (0.024 in) long. The flower tube is about 9 mm (0.35 in) long and the sepals 3–4 mm (0.12–0.16 in) long, the stamens much longer than the sepals. Flowering occurs in December and January.

== Taxonomy ==
This pimelea was first formally described in 1873 by George Bentham, who gave it the name Pimelea lehmanniana var. ligustrinoides in Flora Australiensis from specimens collected by James Drummond in the Swan River Colony. In 1984, Barbara Lynette Rye raised the variety to species status as P. rara in the journal Nuytsia. The specific epithet (rara) means "scattered" or "uncommon".

== Distribution and habitat ==
Pimelea rara grows in jarrah forest on the Darling Range in a small area between Parkerville and the Perth Observatory in the Jarrah Forest bioregion of south-western Western Australia.

== Conservation status ==
Pimelea rara is listed as "Priority Four" by the Government of Western Australia Department of Biodiversity, Conservation and Attractions, meaning that it is rare or near threatened.
