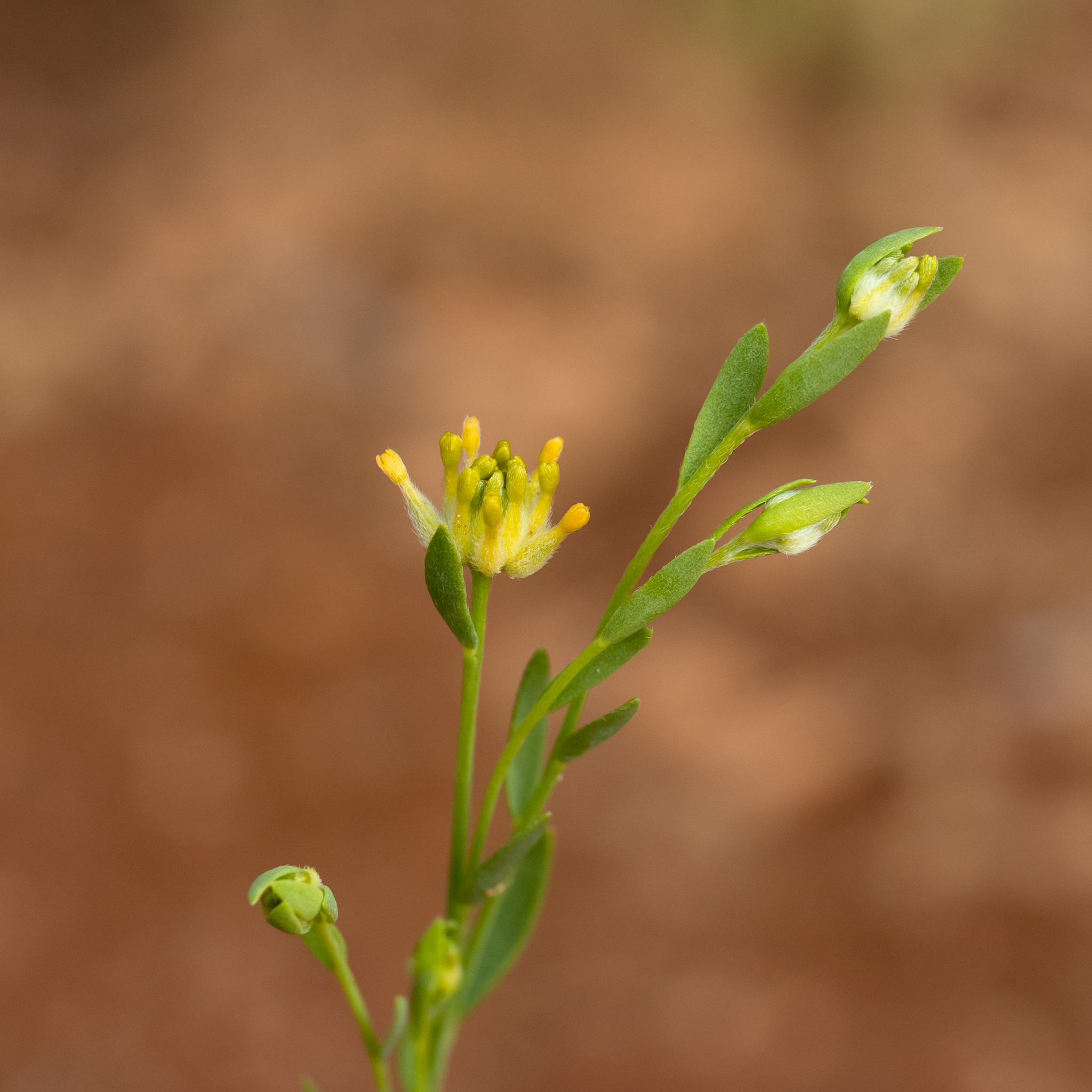
- In the Gawler Ranges

Scientific classification
- Kingdom: Plantae
- Clade: Tracheophytes
- Clade: Angiosperms
- Clade: Eudicots
- Clade: Rosids
- Order: Malvales
- Family: Thymelaeaceae
- Genus: Pimelea
- Species: P. simplex

Binomial name
- Pimelea simplex F.Muell.

Synonyms
- Banksia simplex (F.Muell.) Kuntze

= Pimelea simplex =

Species of plant

Pimelea simplex, commonly known as desert rice-flower, is a species of flowering plant in the family Thymelaeaceae and is endemic to inland Australia. It is a herb or semi-woody annual with narrowly elliptic to linear leaves, and compact heads of densely hairy white to yellowish-green flowers.

== Description ==
Pimelea simplex is herb or semi-woody annual that typically grows to a height of 5–50 cm (2.0–19.7 in) and has hairy young stems. The leaves are arranged alternately along the stems and are usually narrowly elliptic, 3–30 mm (0.12–1.18 in) long and 0.8–3 mm (0.031–0.118 in) wide on a short petiole. The flowers are bisexual and borne on the ends of branches in dense clusters of many white to yellowish-green flowers, the rachis densely covered with fine hairs. The floral tube is 2.5–5.0 mm (0.098–0.197 in) long, the sepals erect and 0.4–1 mm (0.016–0.039 in) long. Flowering occurs from June to October.

== Taxonomy ==
Pimelea simplex was first formally described in 1853 by Ferdinand von Mueller in the journal Linnaea. The specific epithet, (simplex) means "simple" or "undivided".

In 1983, S. Threlfall described two subspecies of P. simplex in the journal Brunonia, and the names are accepted by the Australian Plant Census:

- Pimelea simplex subsp. continua (J.M.Black) Threlfall (previously known as Pimelea continua J.M.Black), is a sturdy plant with flower clusters usually 10–18 mm (0.39–0.71 in) long at maturity, on peduncles up to 30 mm (1.2 in) long, the individual flowers 5–7 mm (0.20–0.28 in) long.
- Pimelea simplex F.Muell. subsp. simplex is a slender plant with flower clusters up to 10 mm (0.39 in) long at maturity, on peduncles up to 15 mm (0.59 in) long, the individual flowers 4–6 mm (0.16–0.24 in) long.

== Distribution and habitat ==
Subspecies continua tends to grow on soils on heavier texture than subsp. simplex. Both species are found in inland Australia, but subsp. simpex has a wider distribution, occurring throughout most of South Australia, western New South Wales, central and south-western Queensland, and the far north-west of Victoria. Subspecies continua does not appear to occur in Victoria but is known from a few collections in the Northern Territory.

== Conservation status ==
Pimelea simplex is listed as "near threatened" under the northern Territory Territory Parks and Wildlife Conservation Act.
