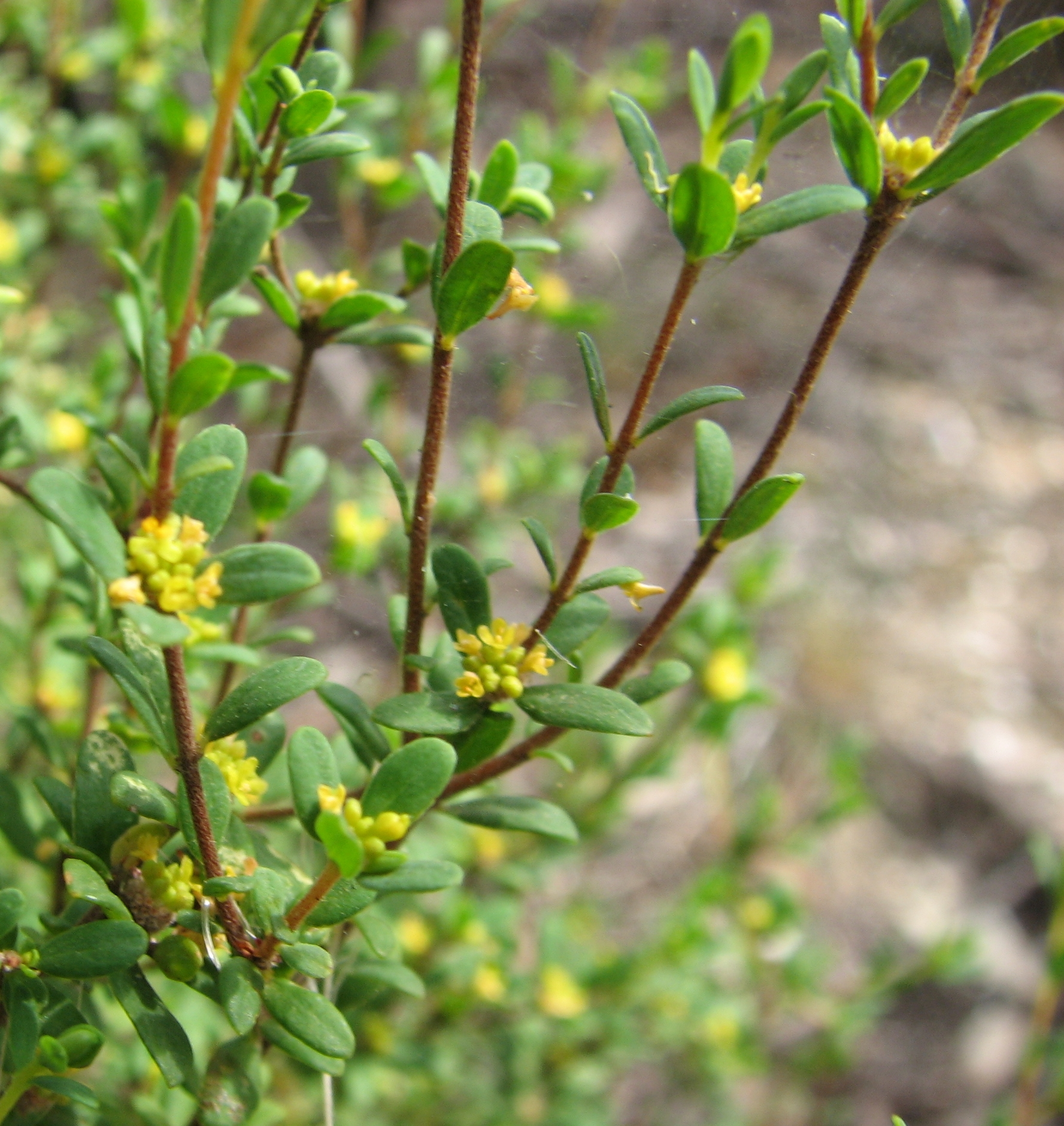
- In the Long Forest Nature Conservation Reserve

Scientific classification
- Kingdom: Plantae
- Clade: Tracheophytes
- Clade: Angiosperms
- Clade: Eudicots
- Clade: Rosids
- Order: Malvales
- Family: Thymelaeaceae
- Genus: Pimelea
- Species: P. hewardiana

Binomial name
- Pimelea hewardiana Meisn.

Synonyms
- Banksia elachantha Kuntze; Pimelea elachantha F.Muell. nom. illeg. p.p.; Pimelea hewardiana var. elachantha F.Muell. ex Meisn.; Pimelea hewardiana Meisn. var. hewardiana

= Pimelea hewardiana =

Species of plant

Pimelea hewardiana, commonly known as forked rice-flower, is a species of flowering plant in the family Thymelaeaceae and is endemic to south-eastern continental Australia. It is a shrub with narrowly elliptic leaves and head-like clusters of 7 to 34 unisexual yellow flowers.

== Description ==
Pimelea hewardiana is a shrub that typically grows to a height of 40–70 cm (16–28 in), it young stems covered with short hairs. The leaves are arranged in opposite pairs, narrowly elliptic to egg-shaped with the narrower end towards the base, 3–11.5 mm (0.12–0.45 in) long, 1.0–3.5 mm (0.039–0.138 in) wide on a short petiole. The lower surface of the leaves is paler than the upper surface. The flowers are arranged on the ends of branches or in leaf axils in head-like, compact clusters of 7 to 34, surrounded by 4 glabrous, leaf-like involucral bracts 5–11 mm (0.20–0.43 in) long and 1–3 mm (0.039–0.118 in) wide. The flowers are unisexual and yellow, the flower tube 1.0–2.5 mm (0.039–0.098 in) long, the sepals 0.5–1.5 mm (0.020–0.059 in) long, and the stamens in male flowers shorter than the sepals. Flowering mainly occurs from April to October.

== Taxonomy ==
Pimelea hewardiana was first formally described in 1854 by Carl Meissner in the journal Linnaea. The specific epithet (hewardiana) honours the botanist, Robert Heward (1791–1877).

== Distribution and habitat ==
Forked rice-flower grows in mallee shrubland, usually in rocky ground, from the Glenelg River to the Bacchus Marsh area, west of Melbourne. It was formerly found in south-eastern South Australia, but is now considered to be extinct in that state.

== Conservation status ==
This species is listed as "rare" on the Department of Sustainability and Environment's Advisory List of Rare Or Threatened Plants In Victoria.
