= Pimelea filifolia =

Scientific classification
- Kingdom: Plantae
- Clade: Tracheophytes
- Clade: Angiosperms
- Clade: Eudicots
- Clade: Rosids
- Order: Malvales
- Family: Thymelaeaceae
- Genus: Pimelea
- Species: P. filifolia

Binomial name
- Pimelea filifolia (Rye) C.S.P.Foster & Henwood

Species of flowering plant

Pimelea filifolia is a species of flowering plant in the family Thymelaeaceae and is endemic to Arnhem Land in the Northern Territory of Australia. It is an erect herb with thread-like leaves and clusters of pale pink flowers.

== Description ==
Pimelea filifolia is an erect herb that typically grows to a height of 20–45 cm (7.9–17.7 in). The leaves are thread-like, 5–34 mm (0.20–1.34 in) long and 0.2–1 mm (0.0079–0.0394 in) wide. The flowers are arranged in clusters on a peduncle 40–100 mm (1.6–3.9 in) long surrounded by green and purplish, egg-shaped involucral bracts 3.5–7 mm (0.14–0.28 in) long and 2–5 mm (0.079–0.197 in) wide. The flowers are pale pink or purplish white, each on a pedicel up to 2.2 mm (0.087 in) long, the floral tube 4–10.5 mm (0.16–0.41 in) long and the sepals 1.1–1.6 mm (0.043–0.063 in) long. Flowering occurs between February and July.

== Taxonomy ==
This species was first formally described in 1990 by Barbara Lynette Rye who gave it the name Thecanthes filifolia in the Flora of Australia from specimens collected by Clyde Dunlop. (Note: https://www.anbg.gov.au/biography/dunlop-clyde-robert.html) In 2016, Charles S.P. Foster and Murray J. Henwood changed the name to Pimelea filifolia in Australian Systematic Botany. The specific epithet (filifolia) means "thread-leaved".

== Distribution and habitat ==
Pimelea filifolia grows in sandy soil on sandstone pavement, usually near watercourses, from the far north to near Katherine, in Arnhem Land.

== Conservation status ==
Pimelea filifolia is listed as "least" under the Northern Territory Territory Parks and Wildlife Conservation Act.
