= Pimelea sericostachya =

Scientific classification
- Kingdom: Plantae
- Clade: Tracheophytes
- Clade: Angiosperms
- Clade: Eudicots
- Clade: Rosids
- Order: Malvales
- Family: Thymelaeaceae
- Genus: Pimelea
- Species: P. sericostachya

Binomial name
- Pimelea sericostachya F.Muell.

Species of shrub

Pimelea sericostachya is a species of flowering plant in the family Thymelaeaceae and is endemic to Queensland. It is an undershrub or shrub with densely hairy young stems, narrowly elliptic leaves, and heads of yellow or pale yellow flowers.

== Description ==
Pimelea sericostachya is an undershrub or shrub that typically grows to a height of 30–80 cm (12–31 in), its young stems densely hairy. The leaves are narrowly elliptic, 14–32 mm (0.55–1.26 in) long and 3–9 mm (0.12–0.35 in) wide on a petiole 0.7–1.5 mm (0.028–0.059 in) long. The flowers are bisexual or female, yellow or pale yellow, and arranged in clusters of 33 to 95, 40–100 mm (1.6–3.9 in) long at maturity. The floral tube is 3–7.5 mm (0.12–0.30 in) long and the sepals 0.5–1.5 mm (0.020–0.059 in) long. Flowering occurs from February to September.

== Taxonomy and naming ==
Pimelea sericostachya was first formally described in 1864 by Ferdinand von Mueller in his Fragmenta Phytographiae Australiae from specimens collected near the "Sellham River" by Edward Bowman. The specific epithet (sericostachya) means "silky flower spike".

== Distribution and habitat ==
This pimelea grows in open forest and woodland on hills and ridges in sandy soil, between Bellevue Station west of Port Douglas, the Sellheim River south-east of Charters Towers and Dicks Tableland west of Mackay.
