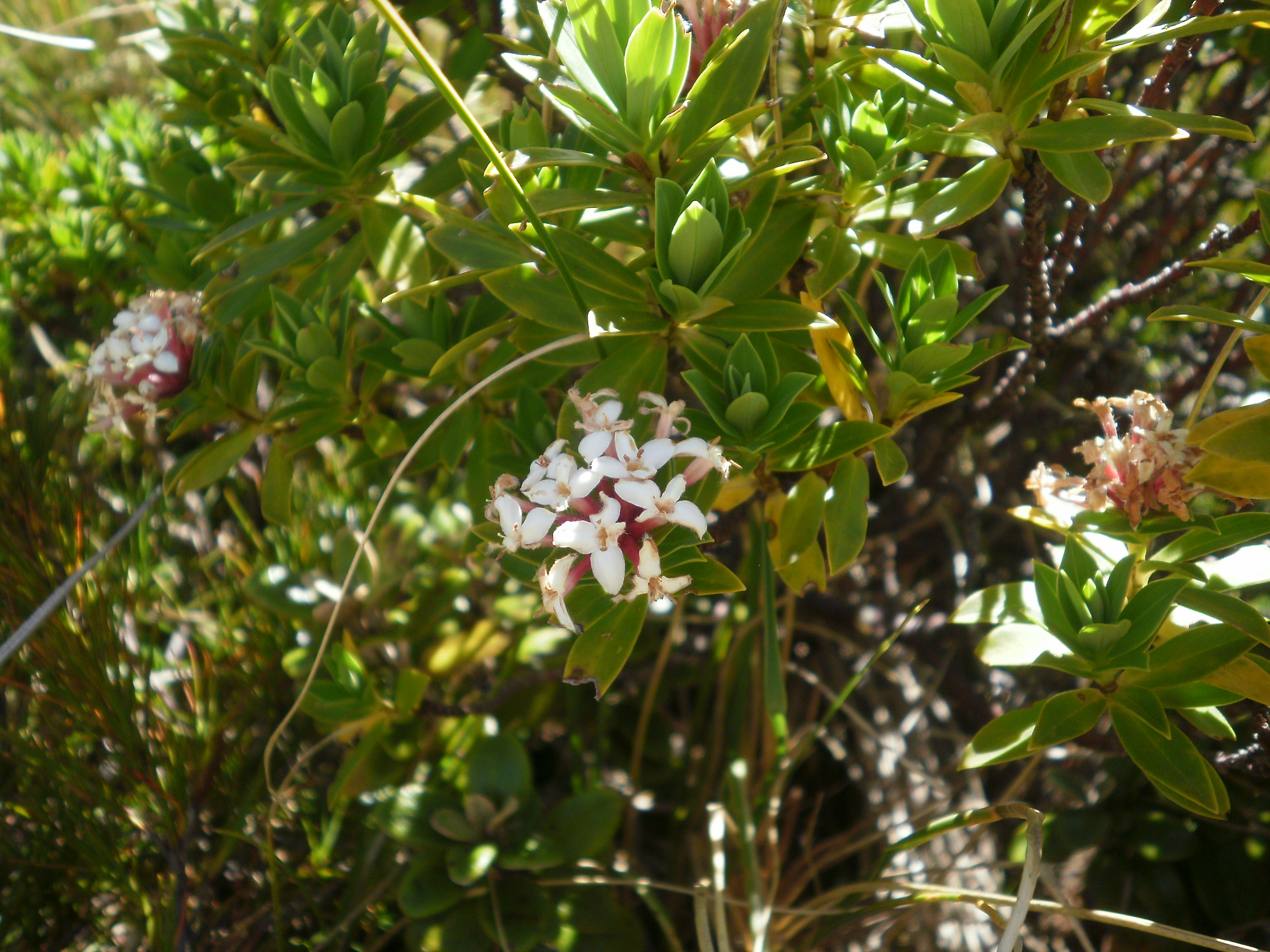

Scientific classification
- Kingdom: Plantae
- Clade: Tracheophytes
- Clade: Angiosperms
- Clade: Eudicots
- Clade: Rosids
- Order: Malvales
- Family: Thymelaeaceae
- Genus: Pimelea
- Species: P. longifolia

Binomial name
- Pimelea longifolia Sol. ex Wikstr.

Synonyms
- Passerina longifolia

= Pimelea longifolia =

Species of shrub

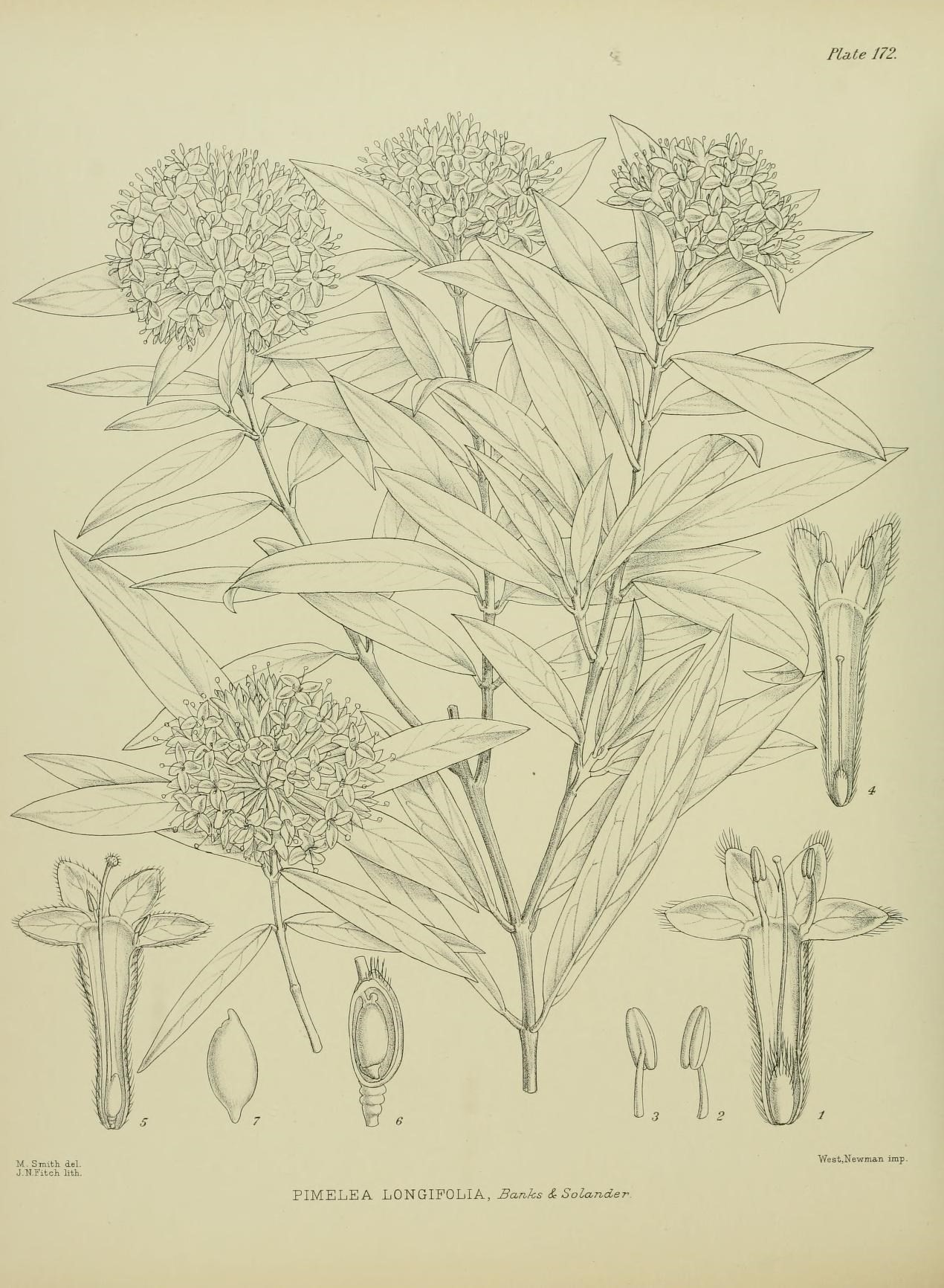
P. longifolia by Matilda Smith.

Pimelea longifolia, also known as long-leaved pimelea and tāranga, is a small shrub native to New Zealand.

Pimelea longifolia is found from coastal to alpine environments, often in open areas in or around forest, scrub and rocky places.

== Distribution and habitat ==
Tāranga grows on clay banks in Auckland, Wellington, and the west of the South Island.
