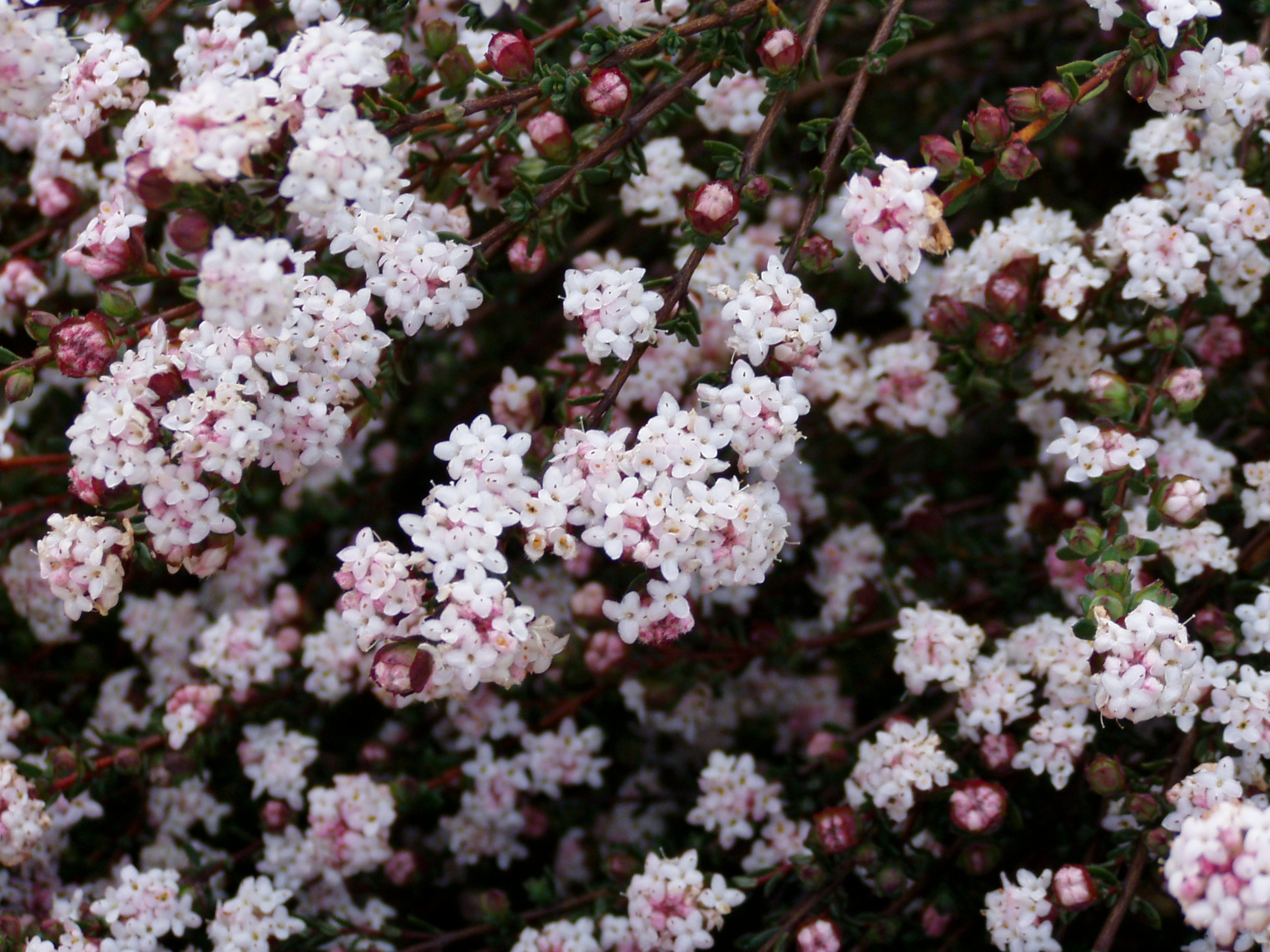
- In the Australian National Botanic Gardens

Scientific classification
- Kingdom: Plantae
- Clade: Tracheophytes
- Clade: Angiosperms
- Clade: Eudicots
- Clade: Rosids
- Order: Malvales
- Family: Thymelaeaceae
- Genus: Pimelea
- Species: P. brachyphylla

Binomial name
- Pimelea brachyphylla Benth.

= Pimelea brachyphylla =

Species of shrub

Pimelea brachyphylla is a species of flowering plant in the family Thymelaeaceae and is endemic to the south-west of Western Australia. It is an erect to spreading shrub with linear to elliptic leaves and clusters of white, tube-shaped flowers.

== Description ==
Pimelea brachyphylla is an erect to spreading shrub or undershrub that typically grows to 0.1–1 m (3.9 in – 3 ft 3.4 in) high. The leaves are linear to oval-oblong, top and underside surface a different colour, 2–10 mm (0.079–0.394 in) long, 1–3 mm (0.039–0.118 in) wide, sessile or with a short stalk. The inflorescence are upright, flowers are bisexual or female, white and smooth on the inside. The 4-6 flower bracts are egg-shaped to broadly elliptic, 4.5–8 mm (0.18–0.31 in) long, 2.5–7 mm (0.098–0.276 in) wide, hairy on the inside and sometimes very small hairs on the margins. Flowering occurs from June to October.

== Taxonomy ==
Pimelea brachyphylla was first formally described in 1873 by George Bentham in Flora Australiensis. The specific epithet (brachyphylla) means "short-leaved".

== Distribution and habitat ==
This pimelea grows in mallee woodland or shrubland from near Wagin to Israelite Bay in the Avon Wheatbelt, Coolgardie, Esperance Plains, Jarrah Forest and Mallee bioregions of south-western Western Australia.

== Conservation status ==
Pimelea brachyphylla is listed as "not threatened" by the Government of Western Australia Department of Biodiversity, Conservation and Attractions.
