= Pimelea leptostachya =

Scientific classification
- Kingdom: Plantae
- Clade: Tracheophytes
- Clade: Angiosperms
- Clade: Eudicots
- Clade: Rosids
- Order: Malvales
- Family: Thymelaeaceae
- Genus: Pimelea
- Species: P. leptostachya

Binomial name
- Pimelea leptostachya Benth.

Synonyms
- Banksia leptostachya (Benth.) Kuntze

Species of shrub

Pimelea leptostachya is a species of flowering plant in the family Thymelaeaceae and is endemic to central Queensland. It is a shrub with narrowly elliptic leaves and spikes of maroon or yellow, tube-shaped flowers arranged in groups of 13 to 23.

== Description ==
Pimelea leptostachya is a shrub that typically grows to a height of 20–40 cm (7.9–15.7 in) and has densely hairy young stems. The leaves are narrowly elliptic, 11–30 mm (0.43–1.18 in) long and 3.0–5.5 mm (0.12–0.22 in) wide on a petiole 0.7–1.1 mm (0.028–0.043 in) long. The upper surface of the leaves is glabrous and the lower surface is covered with coarse hairs pressed against the surface. The flowers are arranged on the ends of branches in a spike of 13 to 23 flowers on a sparsely hairy rachis 25–45 mm (0.98–1.77 in) long, the peduncle 2–11 mm (0.079–0.433 in) long. The flowers are maroon or yellow, each flower on a pedicel 0.9–2 mm (0.035–0.079 in) long, the floral tube 3.9–5 mm (0.15–0.20 in) long, the sepals 0.8–1.2 mm (0.031–0.047 in) long, and the style about the same length as the floral tube. Flowering has been observed from May to June and from October to December.

== Taxonomy ==
Pimelea leptostachya was first formally described in 1873 by George Bentham in Flora Australiensis from specimens collected by Edward Bowman. (Note: https://www.anbg.gov.au/biography/bowman-edward.html.) The specific epithet (leptostachya) means "slender flower spike".

== Distribution and habitat ==
This pimelea grows on hillsides, often near sandstone cliffs or rocks, between Capella, Injune, Springsure and Rockhampton in central Queensland.

== Conservation status ==
Pimelea leptostachya is listed as "least concern" under the Queensland Government Nature Conservation Act 1992.
