= Pimelea pelinos =

Conservation status
- Priority One — Poorly Known Taxa (DEC)

Scientific classification
- Kingdom: Plantae
- Clade: Tracheophytes
- Clade: Angiosperms
- Clade: Eudicots
- Clade: Rosids
- Order: Malvales
- Family: Thymelaeaceae
- Genus: Pimelea
- Species: P. pelinos

Binomial name
- Pimelea pelinos Rye

Species of flowering plant

Pimelea pelinos is a species of flowering plant in the family Thymelaeaceae and is endemic to a small area in the southwest of Western Australia. It is an erect, straggling shrub with narrowly egg-shaped leaves, the narrower end towards the base, and erect clusters of cream-coloured, unisexual flowers surrounded by 2 or 4 egg-shaped, leaf-like involucral bracts.

== Description ==
Pimelea pelinos is an erect, straggling shrub that typically grows to a height of 30–60 cm (12–24 in), and has a single glabrous stem at the base. The leaves are arranged in opposite pairs, narrowly egg-shaped with the narrower end towards the base, 2.5–11.5 mm (0.098–0.453 in) long and 0.8–2.5 mm (0.031–0.098 in) wide on a petiole 0.2–0.5 mm (0.0079–0.0197 in) long. The flowers are arranged on short side branches on a peduncle 0.5–3.5 mm (0.020–0.138 in) long surrounded by 2 or 4 egg-shaped, sessile, leaf-like involucral bracts 3.3–6 mm (0.13–0.24 in) long. The flowers are cream-coloured and densely hairy on the outside. Male flowers have a floral tube 2–3.2 mm (0.079–0.126 in) long, the sepals 1.0–1.5 mm (0.039–0.059 in) long, female flowers a floral tube about 1.5 mm (0.059 in) long, the sepals about 0.8 mm (0.031 in) long. Flowering occurs in June and July.

== Taxonomy ==
Pimelea pelinos was first formally described in 1989 by Barbara Lynette Rye and the description was published in the journal Nuytsia from specimens collected east of Scaddan in 1988. The specific epithet (pelinos) means "of clay or mud", referring to the habitat of this species.

== Distribution and habitat ==
This pimelea grows around salt lakes in sandy clay, and is only known from near the type location in the Mallee bioregion of south-western Western Australia.

== Conservation status ==
Pimelea pelinos is listed as "Priority One" by the Government of Western Australia Department of Biodiversity, Conservation and Attractions, meaning that it is known from only one or a few locations which are potentially at risk.
