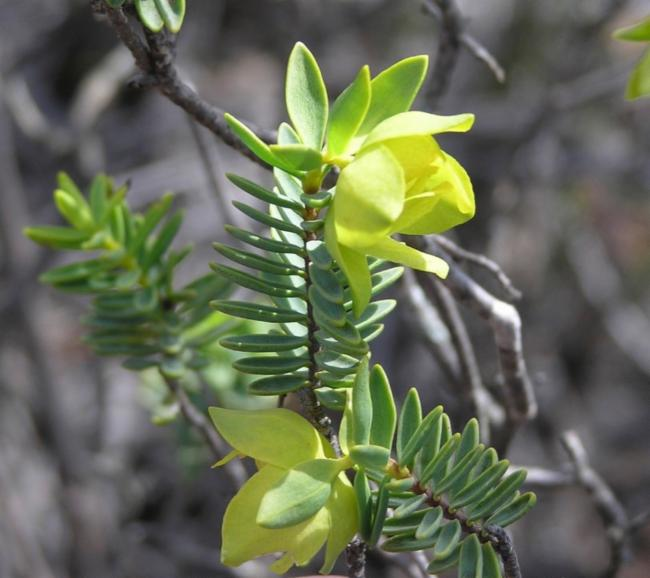

Scientific classification
- Kingdom: Plantae
- Clade: Tracheophytes
- Clade: Angiosperms
- Clade: Eudicots
- Clade: Rosids
- Order: Malvales
- Family: Thymelaeaceae
- Genus: Pimelea
- Species: P. aeruginosa

Binomial name
- Pimelea aeruginosa F.Muell.

= Pimelea aeruginosa =

Species of shrub

Pimelea aeruginosa is a species of small shrub in the family Thymelaeaceae. It is a small shrub with yellow flowers and is endemic to Western Australia.

== Description ==
Pimelea aeruginosa is an upright, spindly small shrub, 0.2–1.5 m (7.9 in – 4 ft 11.1 in) high with smooth stems. The leaves are arranged in opposite pairs, sessile or almost so, narrowly egg-shaped or narrow and broader at the apex, smooth, uniformly coloured throughout, 7–22 mm (0.28–0.87 in) long, 2.5–7.5 mm (0.098–0.295 in) wide. The pendulous inflorescence consist of numerous compact yellow flowers. The over-lapping flower bracts are mostly in pairs of 3–6, broadly elliptic to rounded, 11–25 mm (0.43–0.98 in) long, 7–17 mm (0.28–0.67 in) wide, smooth, occasionally inner bracts may be yellowish with hairs on the edges. The individual tubular flowers are 11–15 mm (0.43–0.59 in) long and smooth. The style 8–11 mm (0.31–0.43 in) long, the sepals 3–3.5 mm (0.12–0.14 in) long, smooth or with occasional hairs along the midrib. The stamens may be longer or shorter than the sepals. Flowering occurs mostly from May to October.

== Taxonomy and naming ==
Pimelea aeruginosa was first formally described in 1869 by Ferdinand von Mueller and the description was published in Fragmenta Phytographiae Australiae. The specific epithet (aeruginosa) is derived from the Latin word aeruginosus meaning "verdigris" with reference to the flower bracts when dry.

== Distribution and habitat ==
This species mostly occurs inland from Geraldton, to Esperance on sand, gravel, sandy clay, over laterite in mallee dominated locations.
