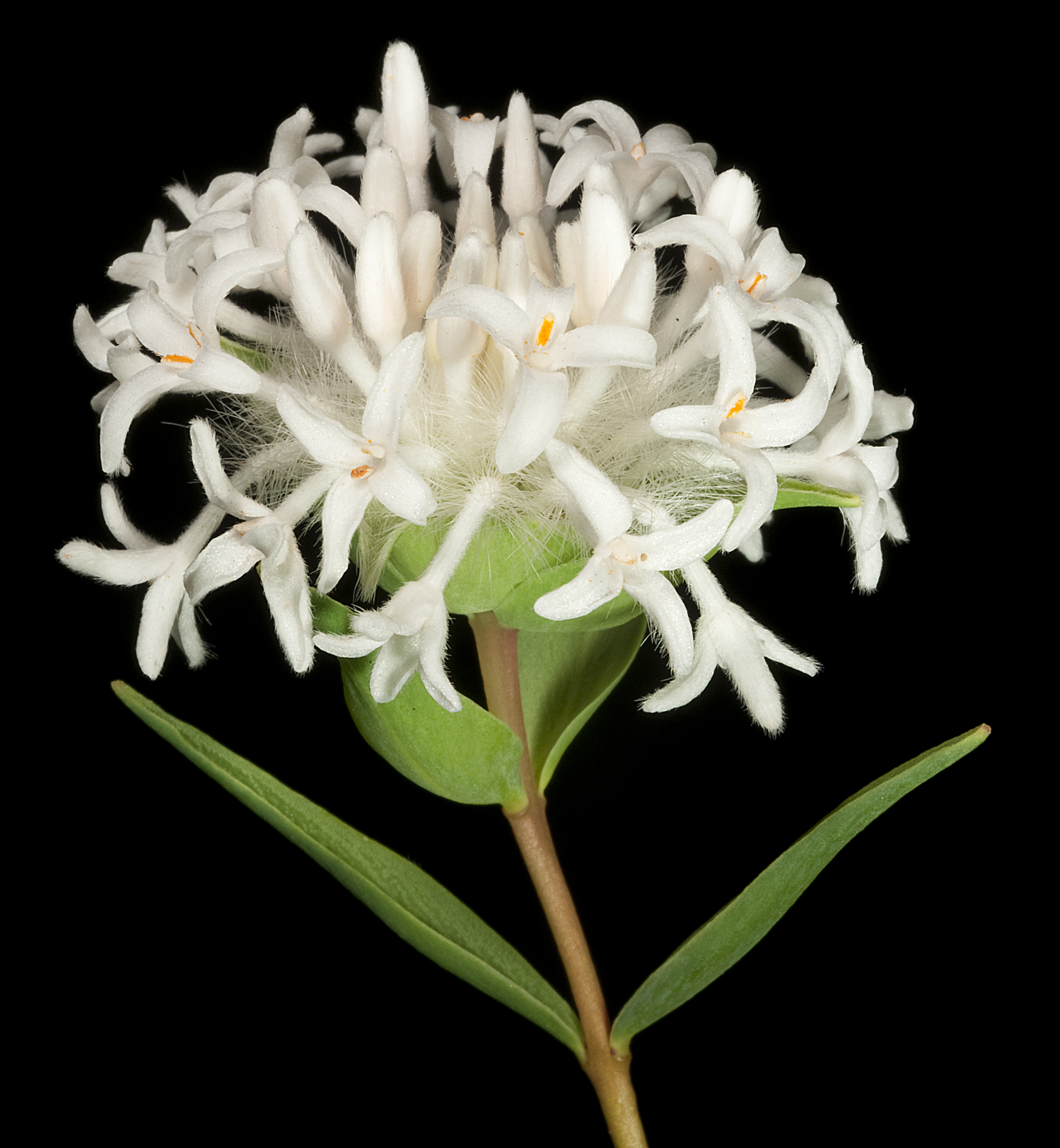
- Pimelea brevistyla

Scientific classification
- Kingdom: Plantae
- Clade: Tracheophytes
- Clade: Angiosperms
- Clade: Eudicots
- Clade: Rosids
- Order: Malvales
- Family: Thymelaeaceae
- Subfamily: Thymelaeoideae
- Genus: Pimelea; Sol. & Banks ex Gaertn.

Species
- About 150 species; see text

Synonyms
- List: Aschenfeldtia Meisn. nom. inval., pro syn.; Banksia J.R.Forst. & G.Forst. nom. rej.; Calyptostregia C.S.P.Foster & Henwood orth. var.; Calyptrostegia C.A.Mey.; Cookia J.F.Gmel. nom. illeg.; Gymnococca C.A.Mey.; Heterolaena (Endl.) C.A.Mey isonym; Heterolaena (Endl.) C.A.Mey.; Macrostegia Turcz. nom. illeg.; Pimelea b. Heterolaena Endl.; Pimelea sect. Calyptrostegia (C.A.Mey.) Benth.; Pimelea sect. Gymnococca (C.A.Mey.) Meisn.; Pimelea sect. Thecanthes (Wikstr.) Meisn.; Pimelea subg. Thecanthes (Wikstr.) Gilg; Pimelia Lodd., G.Lodd. & W.Lodd. orth. var.; Thecanthes Wikstr.

= Pimelea =

Genus of flowering plants

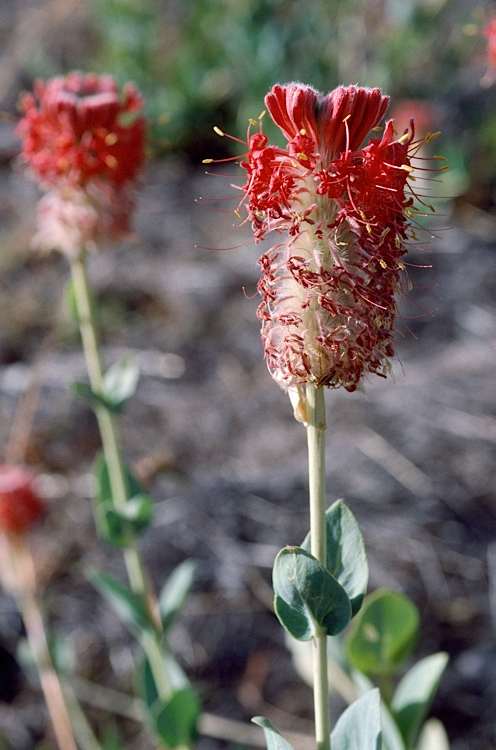
Pimelea decora

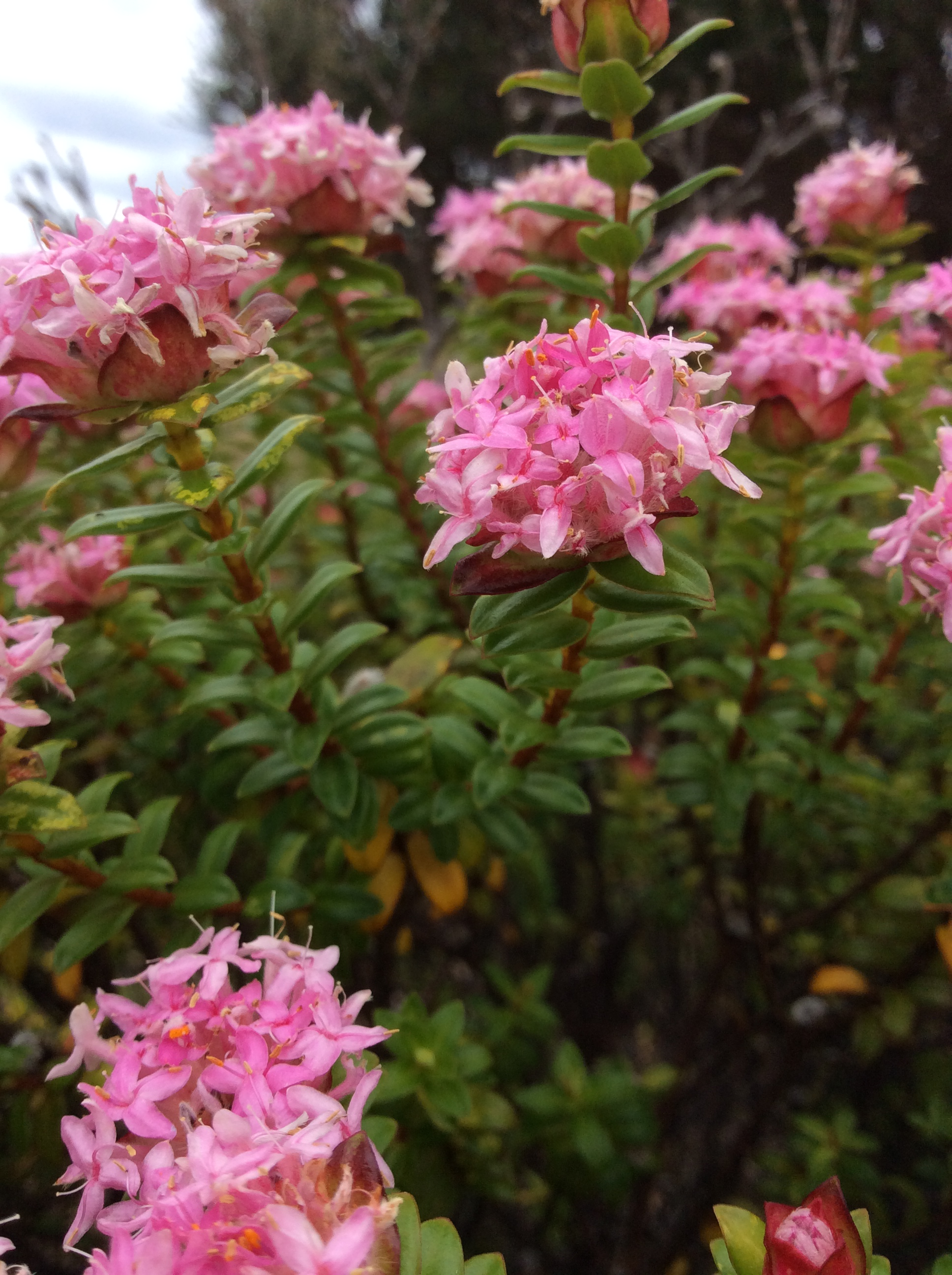
Pimelea ferruginea

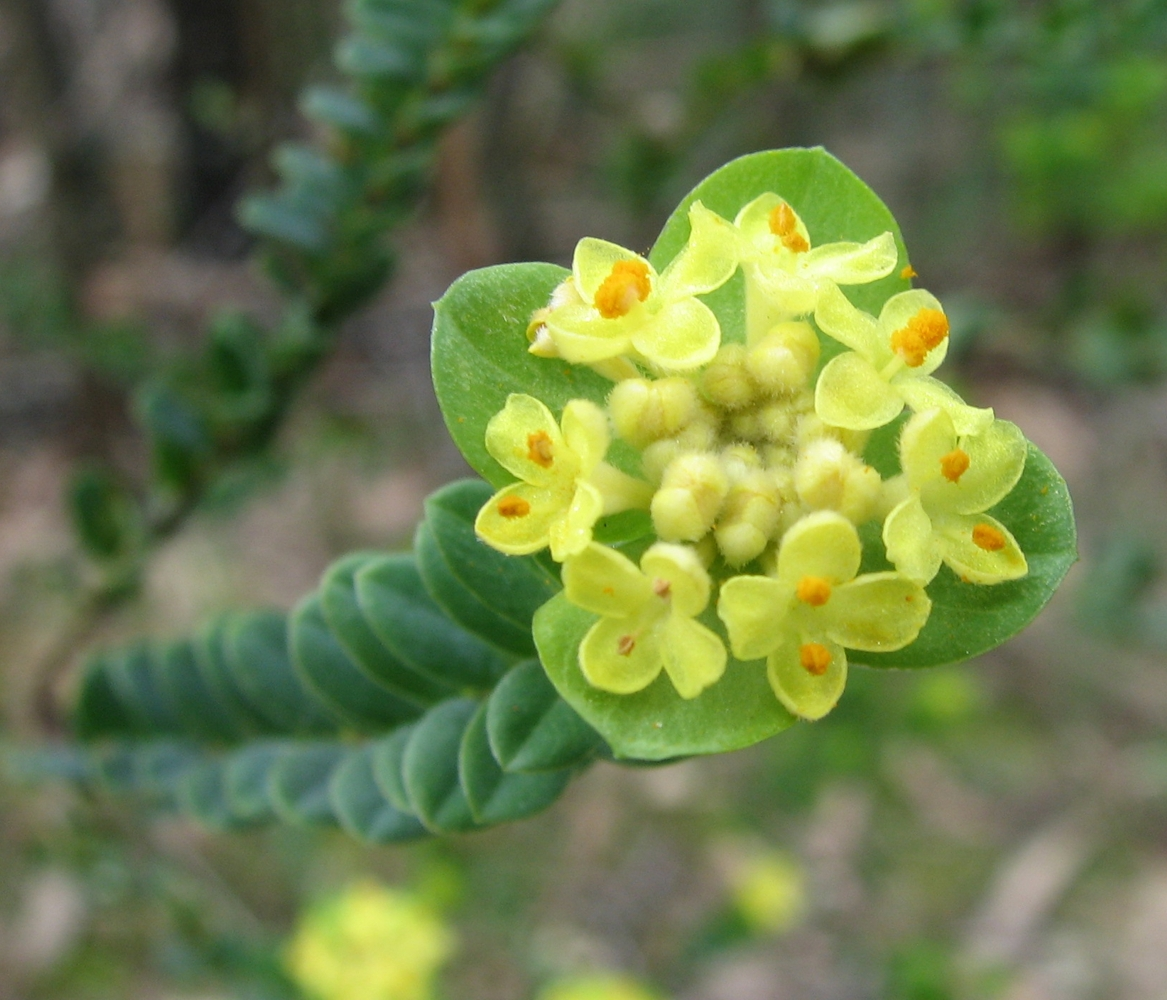
Pimelea flava

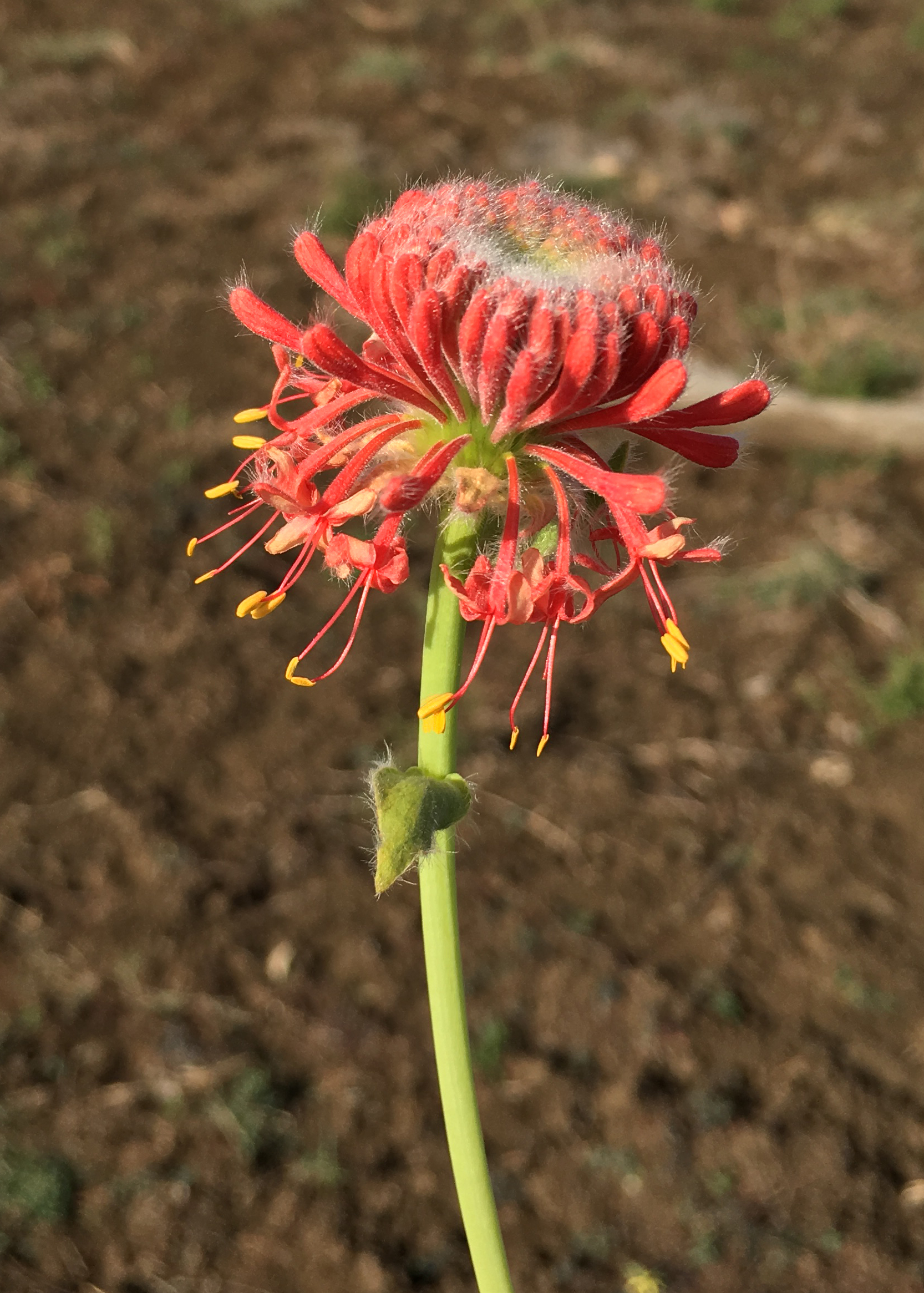
Pimelea haematostachya

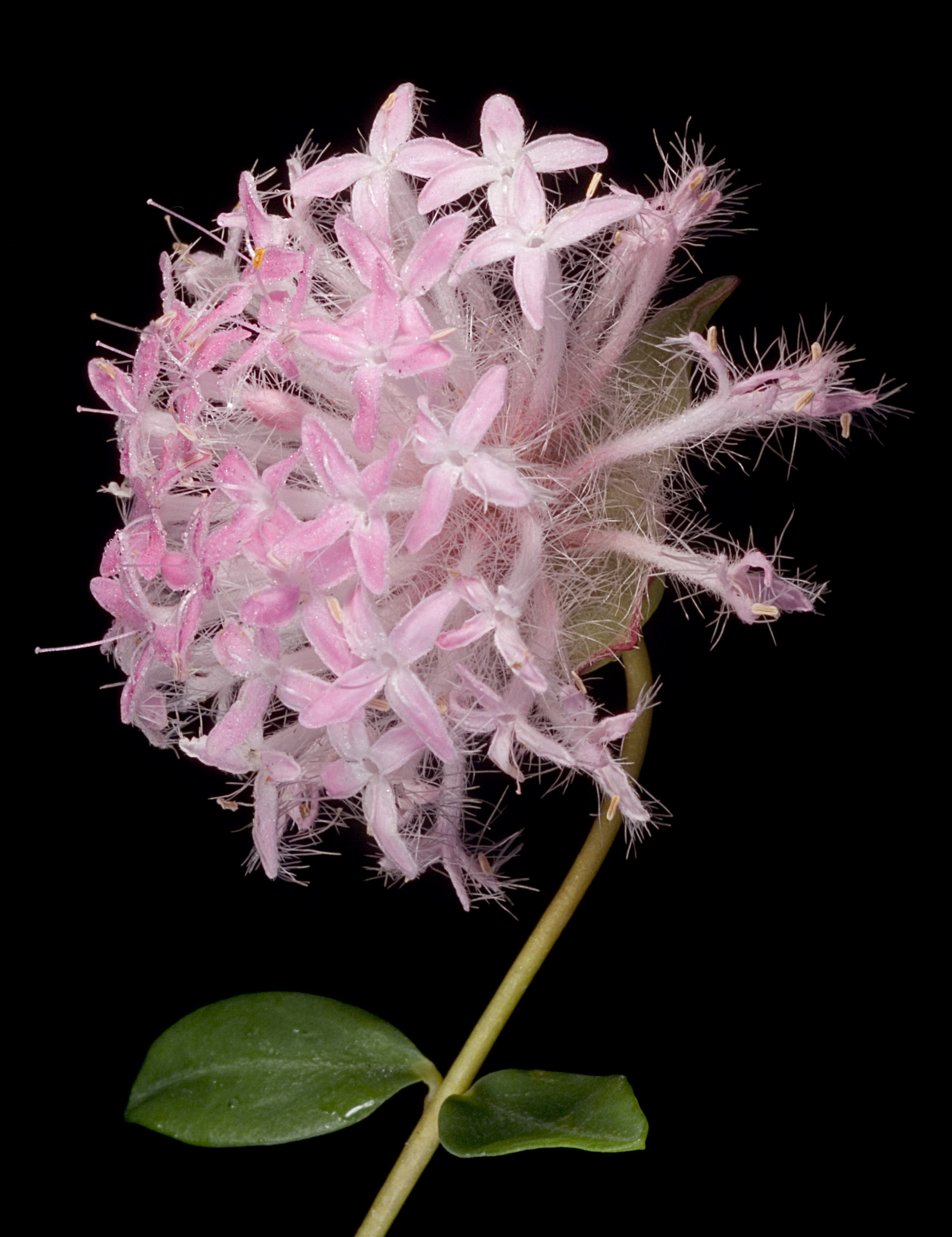
Pimelea hispida

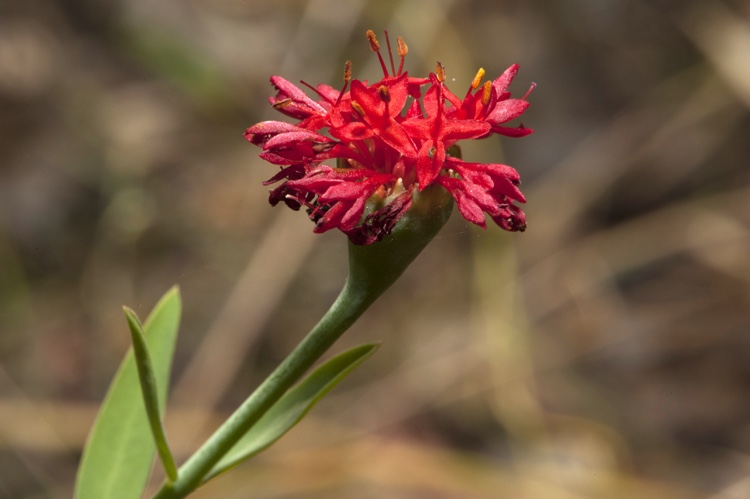
Pimelea punicea

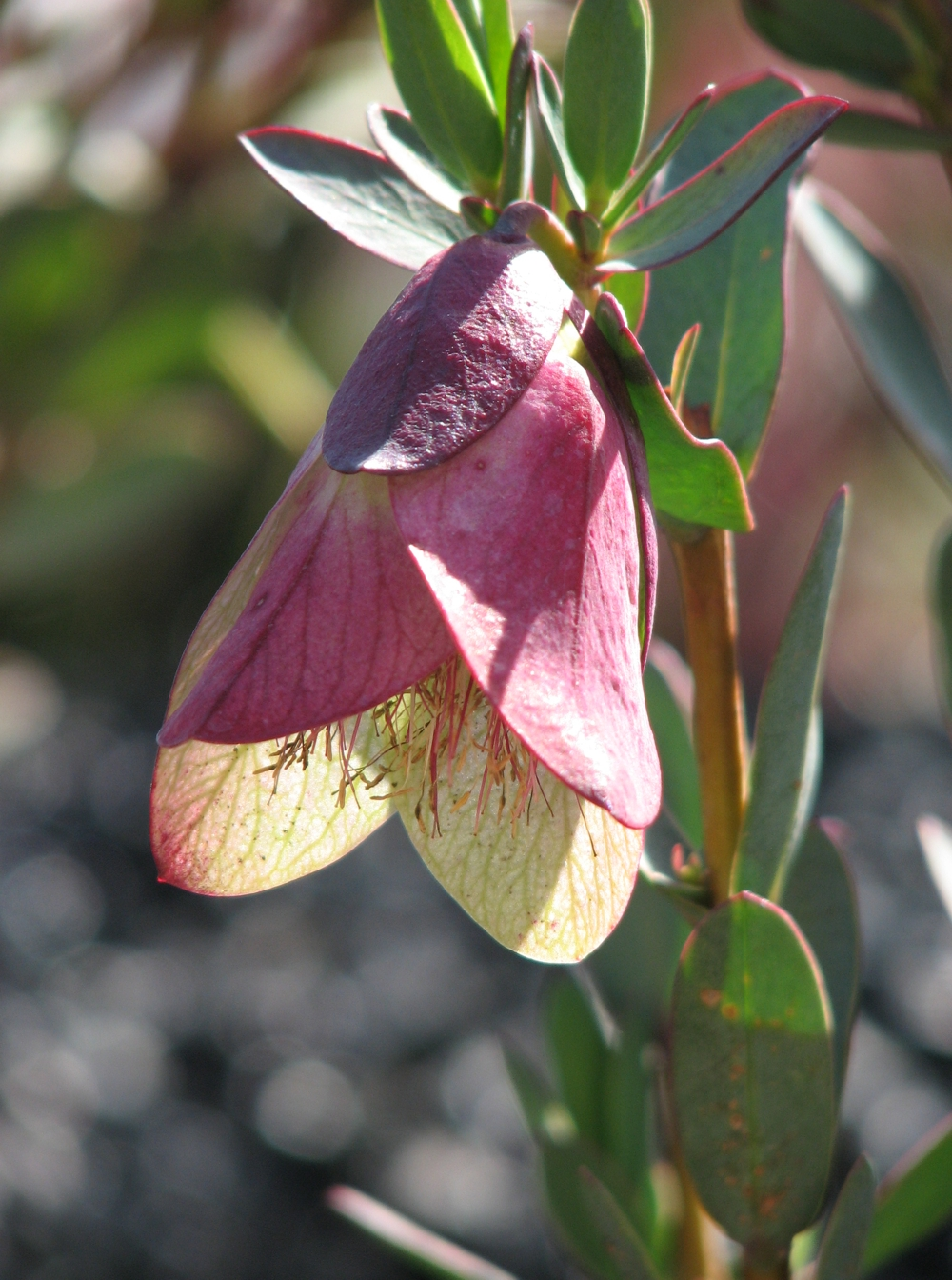
Pimelea physodes

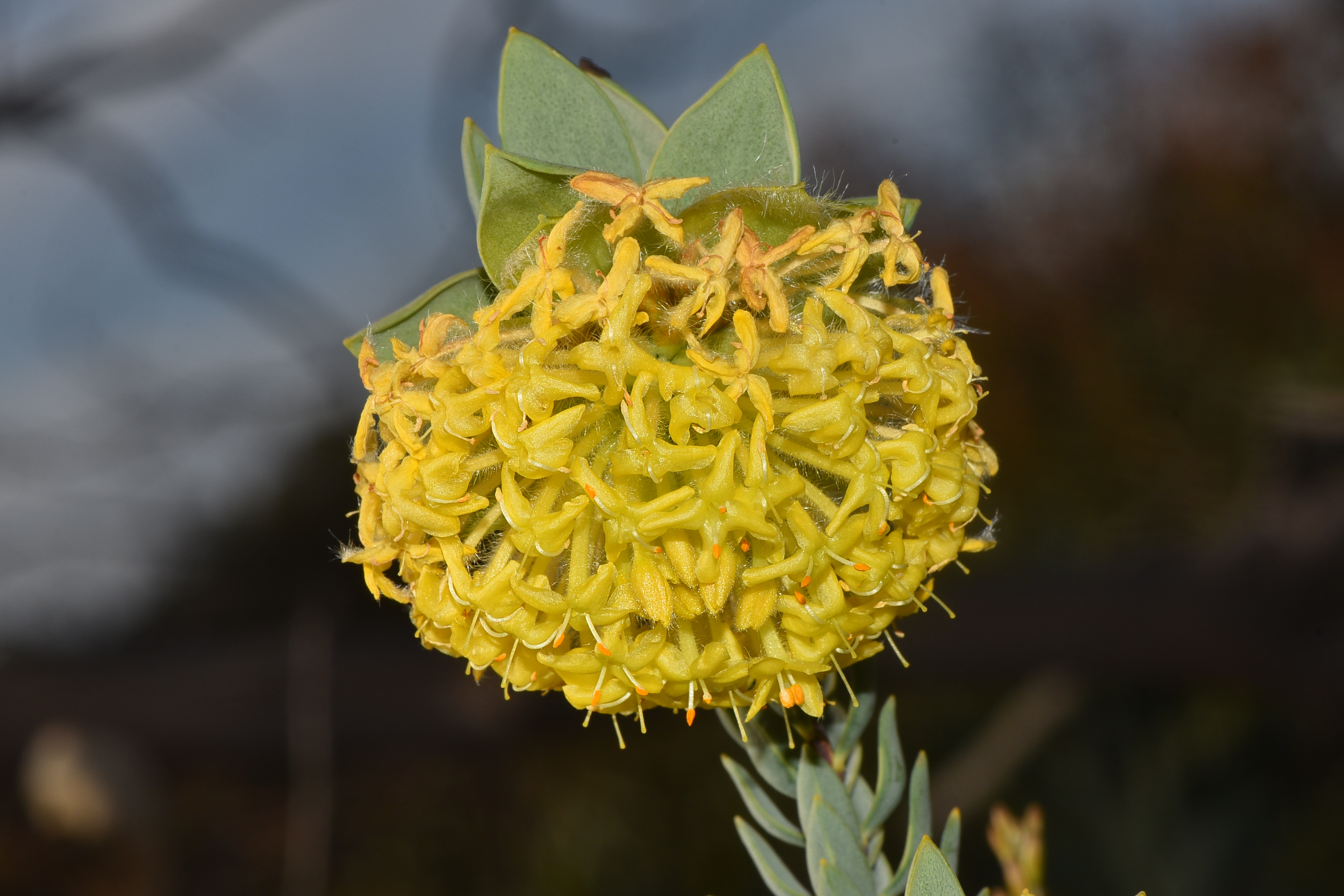
Pimelea suaveolens

Pimelea, commonly known as rice flowers, is a genus of plants belonging to the family Thymelaeaceae. There are about 150 species, including 110 in Australia and 36 in New Zealand.

== Description ==
Plants in the genus Pimelea are herbs or small shrubs, usually with leaves arranged in opposite pairs. The leaves are usually paler on the lower surface and the petiole is usually very short. The flowers are usually arranged in groups on the ends of the branches and have no petals, but four petal-like sepals and two stamens. The ovary has a single ovule and the fruit is usually a nut containing a single seed.

== Taxonomy and naming ==
The genus Pimelea was first formally described in 1788 by Joseph Gaertner from unpublished descriptions by Joseph Banks and Daniel Solander. The first species Gaertner described was Pimelea laevigata, now known as Pimelea prostrata.

The name Pimelea is from the Ancient Greek word πιμελή (pīmelḗ), meaning "soft fat or "lard", possibly referring to the oily seeds or fleshy cotyledons of riceflowers.

== Ecology ==
Some species, including P. curviflora, P. flava, P. glauca, P. linifolia, P. microcephala, P. neo-anglica, P. pauciflora, P. simplex and P. trichostachya, are toxic to stock; there is no known cure.

== Species ==
About 150 species of Pimelea have been formally described, including about 110 in Australia and 36 in New Zealand. The following is a combined list of names accepted by the Australian Plant Census or the New Zealand Plant Conservation Network As of August 2026.

- Pimelea acra C.J.Burrows & de Lange (N.Z.)
- Pimelea actea C.J.Burrows (N.Z.)
- Pimelea aeruginosa F.Muell. (W.A.)
- Pimelea alpina F.Muell. ex Meisn. – alpine riceflower (N.S.W., Vic.)
- Pimelea altior F.Muell. (Qld., N.S.W.)
- Pimelea amabilis (Domin) A.R.Bean (Qld.)
- Pimelea ammocharis F.Muell. (W.A.)
- Pimelea angustifolia R.Br. (W.A.)
- Pimelea approximans A.R.Bean (Qld.)
- Pimelea aquilonia Rye (Qld.)
- Pimelea argentea R.Br. – silvery leaved pimelea (W.A.)
- Pimelea aridula Cheeseman (N.Z.)
  - Pimelea aridula subsp. aridula
  - Pimelea aridula subsp. oliga
- Pimelea avonensis Rye (W.A.)
- Pimelea axiflora F.Muell. ex Meisn. – bootlace bush (N.S.W., Vic., Tas.)
  - Pimelea axiflora subsp. alpina
  - Pimelea axiflora subsp. axiflora
  - Pimelea axiflora subsp. pubescens
- Pimelea barbata C.J.Burrows (N.Z.)
  - Pimelea barbata subsp. barbata
  - Pimelea barbata subsp. omoia
- Pimelea biflora N.A.Wakef. – matted rice flower (N.S.W., Vic.)
- Pimelea brachyphylla Benth. (W.A.)
- Pimelea bracteata Threlfall (N.S.W.)
- Pimelea brevifolia R.Br. (W.A.)
  - Pimelea brevifolia subsp. brevifolia
  - Pimelea brevifolia subsp. modesta
- Pimelea brevistyla Rye (W.A.)
  - Pimelea brevistyla subsp. brevistyla
  - Pimelea brevistyla subsp. minor
- Pimelea buxifolia Hook.f. (N.Z.)
- Pimelea calcicola Rye (W.A.)
- Pimelea carnosa C.J.Burrows (N.Z.)
- Pimelea chlorina A.R.Bean (Qld.)
- Pimelea ciliata Rye (W.A.)
  - Pimelea ciliata subsp. ciliata
  - Pimelea ciliata subsp. longituba
- Pimelea ciliolaris (Threlfall) Rye (N.S.W.)
- Pimelea cinerea R.Br. (Tas.)
- Pimelea clavata Labill. (W.A.)
- Pimelea concinna Allan (N.Z.)
- Pimelea concreta F.Muell. (W.A., N.T.)
- Pimelea confertiflora A.R.Bean (Qld.)
- Pimelea congesta C.Moore & F.Muell. (Lord Howe Island)
- Pimelea cornucopiae Vahl (Qld.)
- Pimelea cracens Rye (W.A.)
  - Pimelea cracens subsp. cracens
  - Pimelea cracens subsp. glabra
- Pimelea cremnophila L.M.Copel. & I.Telford (N.S.W.)
- Pimelea cruciata Rye & Wege (W.A.)
- Pimelea cryptica C.J.Burrows & Enright (N.Z.)
- Pimelea curviflora R.Br. – tough-barked riceflower, curved riceflower (N.S.W., Vic., S.A.)
  - Pimelea curviflora subsp. acuta (Threlfall) N.G.Walsh
  - Pimelea curviflora R.Br. var. curviflora
  - Pimelea curviflora subsp. divergens (Threlfall) N.G.Walsh
  - Pimelea curviflora subsp. fusiformis N.G.Walsh & E.M.Schulz
  - Pimelea curviflora subsp. gracilis (R.Br.) Threlfall
  - Pimelea curviflora subsp. planiticola N.G.Walsh & E.M.Schulz
  - Pimelea curviflora subsp. sericea (Benth.) N.G.Walsh
  - Pimelea curviflora subsp. subglabrata (Threlfall) N.G.Walsh
- Pimelea declivis C.J.Burrows (N.Z.)
- Pimelea decora Domin – Flinders poppy (Qld.)
- Pimelea drummondii (Turcz.) Rye (W.A.)
- Pimelea drupacea Labill. – cherry riceflower (Vic., Tas.)
- Pimelea dura C.J.Burrows (N.Z.)
- Pimelea elongata Threlfall (N.S.W., Qld., S.A.)
- Pimelea erecta Rye (W.A.)
- Pimelea eremitica C.J.Burrows – roimata o tohe (N.Z.)
- Pimelea eyrei F.Muell. (W.A.)
- Pimelea ferruginea Labill. (W.A.)
- Pimelea filifolia (Rye) C.S.P.Foster & Henwood (N.T.)
- Pimelea filiformis Hook.f. (Tas.)
- Pimelea flava R.Br. – yellow riceflower, diosma riceflower (N.S.W., Vic. S.A.)
  - Pimelea flava subsp. dichotoma
  - Pimelea flava subsp. flava
- Pimelea floribunda Meisn. (W.A.)
- Pimelea forrestiana F.Muell. (W.A.)
- Pimelea fugiens A.R.Bean (Qld.)
- Pimelea gigandra A.R.Bean (Qld., N.S.W.)
- Pimelea gilgiana E.Pritz. (W.A.)
- Pimelea glauca R.Br. – smooth riceflower (N.S.W., Qld., Tas., S.A.)
- Pimelea gnidia (J.R.Forst. & G.Forst.) Willd. (N.Z.)
- Pimelea graniticola Rye (W.A.)
- Pimelea haematostachya F.Muell. (Qld.)
- Pimelea halophila Rye (W.A.)
- Pimelea hewardiana Meisn. – forked riceflower (Vic., S.A.)
- Pimelea hirta C.J.Burrows (N.Z.)
- Pimelea hirsuta Meisn. (N.S.W.)
  - Pimelea hirsuta subsp. elliptifolia
  - Pimelea hirsuta subsp. hirsuta
- Pimelea hispida R.Br. – bristly pimelea (W.A.)
- Pimelea holroydii F.Muell.(W.A.)
- Pimelea humilis R.Br.– common riceflower (N.S.W., Vic., Tas., S.A.)
- Pimelea ignota C.J.Burrows & Courtney – pinatoro (N.Z.)
- Pimelea imbricata R.Br. (W.A.)
  - Pimelea imbricata var. imbricata
  - Pimelea imbricata var. major
  - Pimelea imbricata var. petraea
  - Pimelea imbricata var. piligera
  - Pimelea imbricata var. simulans
- Pimelea interioris Rye (N.T.)
- Pimelea lanata R.Br. (W.A.)
- Pimelea latifolia R.Br. (N.S.W., Qld.)
- Pimelea lehmanniana Meisn. (W.A.)
  - Pimelea lehmanniana subsp. lehmanniana
  - Pimelea lehmanniana subsp. nervosa
- Pimelea leiophylla A.M.Gray & M.Baker (Tas.)
- Pimelea leptospermoides F.Muell. (Qld.)
  - Pimelea leptospermoides subsp. bowmanii
  - Pimelea leptospermoides subsp. leptospermoides
- Pimelea leptostachya Benth. (Qld.)
- Pimelea leucantha Diels (W.A.)
- Pimelea ligustrina Labill. – tall riceflower (N.S.W., Qld., Vic., Tas., S.A.)
  - Pimelea ligustrina subsp. ciliata
  - Pimelea ligustrina subsp. hypericina
  - Pimelea ligustrina subsp. ligustrina
- Pimelea linifolia Sm. – slender riceflower (N.S.W., Qld., S.A., Vic., Tas.)
  - Pimelea linifolia subsp. caesia
  - Pimelea linifolia subsp. collina
  - Pimelea linifolia subsp. linifolia
  - Pimelea linifolia subsp. linoides
- Pimelea longiflora R.Br. (W.A.)
  - Pimelea longiflora subsp. longiflora
- Pimelea longifolia Sol. ex Wikstr. – long-leaved pimelea, taranga (N.Z.)
- Pimelea lyallii Hook.f. (N.Z.)
- Pimelea macrostegia (Benth.) J.M.Black (S.A.)
- Pimelea mesoa C.J.Burrows (N.Z.)
  - Pimelea mesoa subsp. macra
  - Pimelea mesoa subsp. mesoa
- Pimelea micrantha F.Muell. ex Meisn. – silky rice-flower (N.S.W., Vic., W.A., S.A., Tas.)
- Pimelea microcephala R.Br. – mallee riceflower or shrubby riceflower (N.S.W., Qld., Vic., N.T., S.A., W.A.)
  - Pimelea microcephala subsp. glabra
  - Pimelea microcephala subsp. microcephala
- Pimelea microphylla Colenso (N.Z.)
- Pimelea milliganii Meisn. (Tas.)
- Pimelea mimosa C.J.Burrows (N.Z.)
- Pimelea mollis A.R.Bean (Qld.)
- Pimelea neoanglica Threlfall – poison pimelea, scanty riceflower (N.S.W., Qld.)
- Pimelea neokyrea Rye (W.A.)
- Pimelea nitens C.J.Burrows & Courtney (N.Z.)
  - Pimelea nitens subsp. aspera
  - Pimelea nitens subsp. nitens
- Pimelea nivea Labill. (Tas.)
- Pimelea notia C.J.Burrows & Thorsen (N.Z.)
- Pimelea octophylla R.Br. – woolly riceflower, downy riceflower (Vic., S.A.)
- Pimelea oreophila C.J.Burrows (N.Z.)
  - Pimelea oreophila subsp. ephaistica
  - Pimelea oreophila subsp. hetera
  - Pimelea oreophila subsp. lepta
  - Pimelea oreophila subsp. oreophila
- Pimelea orthia C.J.Burrows & Thorsen (N.Z.)
  - Pimelea orthia subsp. orthia
  - Pimelea orthia subsp. protea
- Pimelea pagophila Rye (Vic.)
- Pimelea pauciflora R.Br. – poison rice-flower (N.S.W., Vic., Tas.)
- Pimelea pelinos Rye (W.A.)
- Pimelea pendens Rye (W.A.)
- Pimelea penicillaris F.Muell. (N.S.W., Qld., S.A., N.T.)
- Pimelea petrophila F.Muell. (S.A., N.S.W.)
- Pimelea phylicoides (Vic., S.A.)
- Pimelea physodes Hook.f. – Qualup bell (W.A.)
- Pimelea plurinervia Bean (Qld.)
- Pimelea poppelwellii Petrie – Poppelwells pimelea (N.Z.)
- Pimelea preissii Meisn. (W.A.)
- Pimelea prostrata (J.R.Forst. et G.Forst.) Willd. – pinatoro, New Zealand daphne, Strathmore weed (N.Z.)
  - Pimelea prostrata subsp. prostrata
  - Pimelea prostrata subsp. seismica
  - Pimelea prostrata subsp. thermalis
  - Pimelea prostrata subsp. ventosa
- Pimelea pseudolyallii Allan (N.Z.)
- Pimelea punicea R.Br. (W.A, N.T.)
- Pimelea pygmaea F.Muell. & C.Stuart ex Meisn. (Tas.)
- Pimelea rara Rye – summer pimelea (W.A.)
- Pimelea rosea R.Br. – rose banjine (W.A.)
  - Pimelea rosea subsp. annelsii Rye
  - Pimelea rosea R.Br. subsp. rosea
- Pimelea rupestris A.R.Bean (Qld., N.S.W.)
- Pimelea sanguinea F.Muell. (W.A., N.T., Qld.)
- Pimelea sericea R.Br. (Tas.)
- Pimelea sericostachya F.Muell. (Qld.)
- Pimelea sericeovillosa Hook.f. – cushion pimelea (N.Z.)
  - Pimelea sericeovillosa subsp. alta
  - Pimelea sericeovillosa subsp. pulvinaris
  - Pimelea sericeovillosa subsp. sericeovillosa
- Pimelea serpyllifolia R.Br. – thyme riceflower (N.S.W., Vic., Tas., W.A., S.A.)
  - Pimelea serpyllifolia subsp. occidentalis
  - Pimelea serpyllifolia subsp. serpyllifolia
- Pimelea sessilis Rye (W.A.)
- Pimelea simplex F.Muell. – desert riceflower (N.T., N.S.W., Qld., Vic., S.A.)
  - Pimelea simplex subsp. continua
  - Pimelea simplex subsp. simplex
- Pimelea spectabilis Lindl. – bunjong (W.A.)
- Pimelea spicata R.Br. (N.S.W.)
- Pimelea spiculigera F.Muell. (W.A.)
  - Pimelea spiculigera F.Muell. var. spiculigera
  - Pimelea spiculigera var. thesioides (S.Moore) Rye
- Pimelea spinescens Rye – spiny riceflower (Vic.)
  - Pimelea spinescens subsp. pubiflora Rye
  - Pimelea spinescens Rye subsp. spinescens
- Pimelea sporadica C.J.Burrows (N.Z.)
- Pimelea stricta Meisn. (N.S.W., Vic., S.A.) – gaunt rice-flower
- Pimelea strigosa Gand. (N.S.W., Qld.)
- Pimelea suaveolens Meisn. – scented banjine (W.A.)
  - Pimelea suaveolens subsp. flava
  - Pimelea suaveolens subsp. suaveolens
- Pimelea subvillifera (Threlfall) Rye (W.A., S.A.)
- Pimelea sulphurea Meisn. – yellow banjine (W.A.)
- Pimelea suteri Kirk (N.Z.)
- Pimelea sylvestris R.Br. (W.A.)
- Pimelea telura C.J.Burrows – three kings pimelea (N.Z.)
- Pimelea tinctoria Meisn. (W.A.)
- Pimelea tomentosa (J.R.Forst. & G.Forst.) Druce (N.Z.)
- Pimelea traversii Hook.f. (N.Z.)
  - Pimelea traversii subsp. boreus
  - Pimelea traversii subsp. exedra
  - Pimelea traversii subsp. traversii
- Pimelea treyvaudii F.Muell. ex Ewart & B.Rees – grey riceflower (N.S.W., Vic.)
- Pimelea trichostachya Meisn. (N.S.W., Qld., Vic., W.A., S.A., N.T.)
- Pimelea umbratica A.Cunn. ex Meisn. (N.S.W., Qld.)
- Pimelea urvilleana A.Rich. (N.Z.)
  - Pimelea urvilleana subsp. nesica (N.Z.)
  - Pimelea urvilleana subsp. urvilleana – pinatoro (N.Z.)
- Pimelea venosa Threlfall – Bolivia Hill pimelea (N.S.W.)
- Pimelea villifera Meisn. (W.A.)
- Pimelea villosa Sol. ex Sm. – sand daphne, autetaranga, toroheke, sand pimelea (N.Z.)
- Pimelea williamsonii J.M.Black – Williamson's riceflower (Vic., S.A.)
- Pimelea xenica C.J.Burrows – pinatoro (N.Z.)
