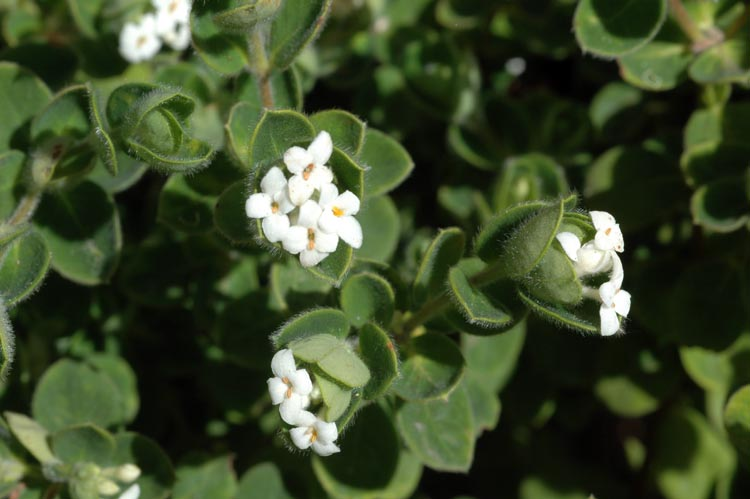
- In the Australian National Botanic Gardens

Scientific classification
- Kingdom: Plantae
- Clade: Tracheophytes
- Clade: Angiosperms
- Clade: Eudicots
- Clade: Rosids
- Order: Malvales
- Family: Thymelaeaceae
- Genus: Pimelea
- Species: P. altior

Binomial name
- Pimelea altior F.Muell.

Synonyms
- Banksia altior (F.Muell.) Kuntze; Pimelea altior F.Muell. var. altior; Pimelea altior var. parvifolia Domin; Pimelea altior var. typica Domin nom. inval.; Pimelea latifolia subsp. B; Pimelea latifolia subsp. altior (F.Muell.) Threlfall; Pimelea latifolia var. altior (F.Muell.) Threlfall; Pimelea latifolia var. parvifolia (Domin) Threlfall

= Pimelea altior =

Species of shrub

Pimelea altior is a species of flowering plant in the family Thymelaeaceae and is endemic to eastern Australia. It is a shrub with elliptic leaves and heads of white, tube-shaped flowers.

== Description ==
Pimelea altior is a shrub that typically grows to a height of 0.9–1.4 m (2 ft 11 in – 4 ft 7 in) and has densely hairy young stems. The leaves are elliptic to broadly elliptic, 14–38 mm (0.55–1.50 in) long and 8–14 mm (0.31–0.55 in) wide, both surface densely covered with white hairs. The flowers are borne in heads of 4 to 7 on a peduncle up to 1 mm (0.039 in) long with four leafy bracts at the base. The flowers are white, the floral tube 5.2–8.2 mm (0.20–0.32 in) long and the sepals 0.9–1.6 mm (0.035–0.063 in) long. Flowering occurs sporadically throughout the year.

== Taxonomy ==
Pimelea altior was first formally described in 1859 by Ferdinand von Mueller in Fragmenta Phytographiae Australiae from specimens collected near Moreton Bay. The specific epithet (altior) means "higher".

== Distribution and habitat ==
This pimealea grows in tall forests and on the edges of rainforest from near Eumundi in south-east Queensland to near Taree in northern New South Wales.
