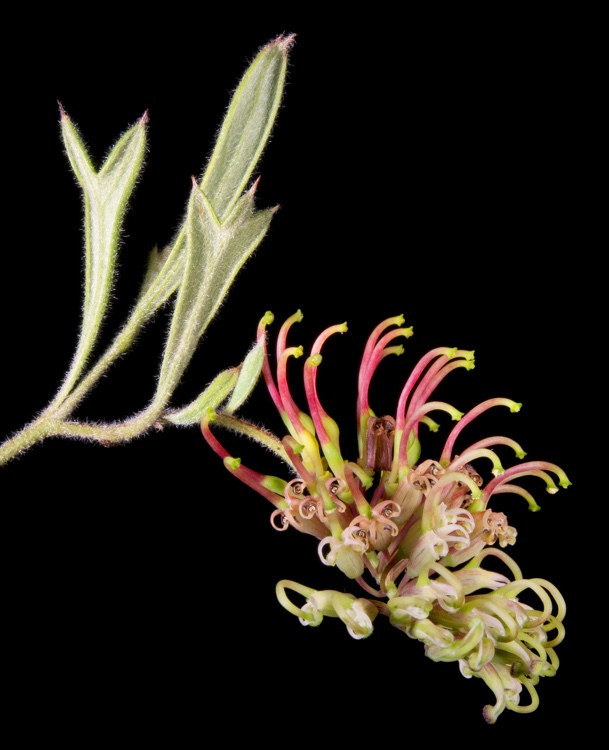

Conservation status
- Least Concern (IUCN 3.1)

Scientific classification
- Kingdom: Plantae
- Clade: Embryophytes
- Clade: Tracheophytes
- Clade: Angiosperms
- Clade: Eudicots
- Order: Proteales
- Family: Proteaceae
- Genus: Grevillea
- Species: G. manglesioides

Binomial name
- Grevillea manglesioides Meisn.

= Grevillea manglesioides =

Species of shrub endemic to Western Australia

Grevillea manglesioides is a species of flowering plant in the family Proteaceae and is endemic to the south-west of Western Australia. It is a spreading shrub usually with wedge-shaped leaves with lobed ends, and toothbrush-shaped clusters of flowers, the colour varying with subspecies.

== Description ==
Grevillea manglesioides is a spreading shrub that typically grows to a height of 0.3–4 m (1 ft 0 in – 13 ft 1 in) and has hairy branchlets. The leaves are usually wedge-shaped, 20–60 mm (0.79–2.36 in) long and 2–25 mm (0.079–0.984 in) wide with two to five lobes on the end. Sometimes the leaves are deeply divided with three narrowly triangular lobes, or narrowly elliptic and 2–6 mm (0.079–0.236 in) wide. The lower surface of the leaves is silky- to woolly-hairy. The flowers are arranged in toothbrush-shaped clusters on a rachis 4–20 mm (0.16–0.79 in) long, the pistil 6.5–11 mm (0.26–0.43 in) long, and the flower colour and flowering time varying with subspecies. The fruit is an oval to elliptic follicle 9.5–15 mm (0.37–0.59 in) long.

== Taxonomy ==
Grevillea manglesioides was first formally described in 1845 by Carl Meissner in Johann Georg Christian Lehmann's Plantae Preissianae. The specific epithet (manglesioides) means "Manglesia-like". Manglesia is now regarded as a synonym of Grevillea.

Three subspecies of G. manglesioides are recognised by the Australian Plant Census:

- Grevillea manglesioides subsp. ferricola Keighery;
- Grevillea manglesioides Meisn. subsp. manglesioides;
- Grevillea manglesioides subsp. metaxa Makinson.

Subspecies ferricola was first formally described by Robert Makinson in the Flora of Australia from specimens collected by Greg Keighery on the Scott Coastal Plain in 1997. Flowering occurs in October and the flowers are greenish-cream with a red or blackish style, the pistil 9.5–10 mm (0.37–0.39 in) long. The epithet ferricola means "iron-inhabiting", referring to the ironstone habitat of this subspecies.

Subspecies manglesioides became the autonym when Donald McGillivray described G. manglesioides subsp. papillosa, now known as G. papillosa. It flowers in most months with a peak from July to December and the flowers are greenish-white to dull red with a dull red or greenish-white style, the pistil 6.5–11 mm (0.26–0.43 in) long.

Subspecies metaxa was first formally described by Robert Makinson in the Flora of Australia from specimens collected by Roy Pullen north-west of Pemberton in 1974. It mainly flowers from October to January and the flowers are cream-coloured or greenish-yellow with a dark red style, the pistil 7.5–9 mm (0.30–0.35 in) long. The epithet metaxa means "raw silk", referring to hairs on the lower surface of the leaves.

== Distribution and habitat ==
Subspecies ferricola grows in heath, often near streams and is restricted to a few places near the Scott River east of Augusta, subsp. manglesioides grows in shrubland or shrubby woodland, usually in winter-wet places, between Ludlow and Margaret River and subsp. metaxa is found in shrubland and forest near streams in the catchments of the Margaret and Blackwood Rivers. All three subspecies occur in the Jarrah Forest, Swan Coastal Plain and Warren bioregions of south-western Western Australia.

== Conservation status ==
Subspecies manglesioides and metaxa are listed as not threatened but subsp. ferricola is listed as priority three by the Government of Western Australia Department of Biodiversity, Conservation and Attractions, meaning that it is poorly known and known from only a few locations but is not under imminent threat.

== See also ==
- List of Grevillea species
