= Scott River (disambiguation) =

Scott River may refer to:

== Rivers ==
- Scott River, a river in California, United States
- Scott River (Western Australia), a river in Western Australia

== Places ==
- Scott River, Western Australia, a locality in Western Australia
- Scott River East, Western Australia, a locality in Western Australia
- Scott National Park, national park in Western Australia located on the Scott River

== Plants ==
- Adenanthos detmoldii, known as Scott River jugflower
- Banksia meisneri subsp. ascendens, known as Scott River banksia
- Darwinia ferricola, known as Scott River darwinia

== Other ==
- Scott & Rivers, an American Japanese-language musical project
