= Ludlow River =

River in Western Australia

Coordinates: 33°35′38″S 115°28′13″E

Location
- Country: Australia

Physical characteristics
- Source
  - location: Whicher Range
  - elevation: 112 metres (367 ft)
- Mouth
  - location: Wonnerup Inlet
  - elevation: 0 metres (0 ft)
- Length: 30 km (19 mi)
- Basin size: 81 km^{2} (31 sq mi)

The Ludlow River is a river in the South West region of Western Australia. It was named after Frank Ludlow, one of the first Western Australian colonists, an arrival on the barque Parmelia in 1829, who explored the locality in 1834.

The headwaters of the river are in the Whicher Range near Claymore. The river flows in a north-westerly direction through Yoganup then through Ludlow and discharges into the Wonnerup Estuary and thence into Geographe Bay and the Indian Ocean.

The Ludlow is located in the Vasse-Wonnerup Conservation District within the Geographe Catchment Area along with the Abba and Sabina Rivers. The majority of the foreshore of the river has been cleared and only 5% is in pristine condition.

The only tributary of the Ludlow is Tiger Gully.
