= Vasse =

Vasse may refer to:

- Vasse (Netherlands), a village
- Gordon Herbert Vasse (1899–1965), Royal Air Force officer
- Thomas Vasse (1774-1801), a French sailor
  - Vasse, Western Australia, town
  - Vasse River, in Western Australia
  - Electoral district of Vasse, in Western Australia

== See also ==
- Louis-Claude Vassé, French sculptor
