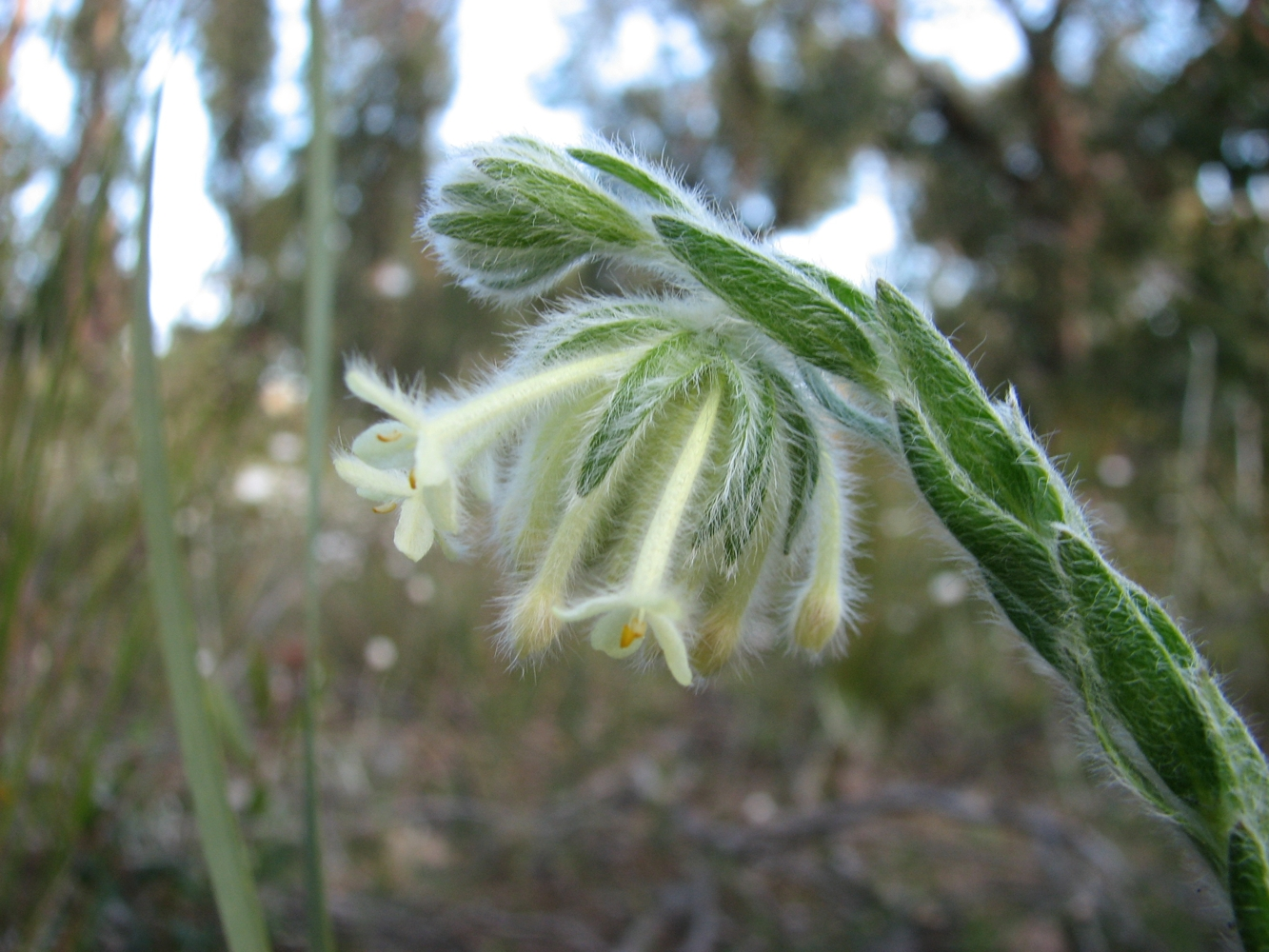
- In Brisbane Ranges National Park

Scientific classification
- Kingdom: Plantae
- Clade: Tracheophytes
- Clade: Angiosperms
- Clade: Eudicots
- Clade: Rosids
- Order: Malvales
- Family: Thymelaeaceae
- Genus: Pimelea
- Species: P. octophylla

Binomial name
- Pimelea octophylla R.Br.

Synonyms
- Banksia octophylla (R.Br.) Kuntze; Pimelea behrii Schltdl.; Pimelea octophylla R.Br. subsp. octophylla; Pimelea octophylla var. behrii (Schltdl.) Meisn.; Pimelea octophylla R.Br. var. octophylla; Pimelea octophylla var. viminea (Schltdl.) Meisn.; Pimelea viminea Schltdl.

= Pimelea octophylla =

Species of plant

Pimelea octophylla, commonly known as woolly riceflower or downy riceflower, is a species of flowering plant in the family Thymelaeaceae and is endemic to south-eastern continental Australia. It is an erect shrub with densely hairy young stems, narrowly elliptic leaves and heads of 22 to 45 densely hairy, cream-coloured to pale yellow flowers surrounded by 6 to 12 leaf-like involucral bracts.

== Description ==
Pimelea octophylla is an erect shrub that typically grows to a height of 0.4–1 m (1 ft 4 in – 3 ft 3 in) and has densely hairy young stems. Its leaves are mostly arranged alternately along the branches, narrowly elliptic, 3–18 mm (0.12–0.71 in) long and 1–6 mm (0.039–0.236 in) wide on a short petiole. The flowers are arranged on the ends of branches in compact, usually pendulous clusters of 25 to 45, sometimes up to 150, with 6 to 12 leaf-like involucral bracts 8–12 mm (0.31–0.47 in) long at the base. The flowers are cream-coloured to pale yellow, either bisexual or female, and densely hairy except at the extreme base. The floral tube is 11–14 mm (0.43–0.55 in) long, the sepals 2–5 mm (0.079–0.197 in) long and the stamens are shorter than the sepals. Flowering mainly occurs from August to February.

== Taxonomy ==
Pimelea octophylla was first formally described in 1810 by Robert Brown in his Prodromus Florae Novae Hollandiae.

According to the Australian Plant Census, three former subspecies are now known as synonyms:

- Pimelea octophylla subsp. ciliolaris Threlfall, is a synonym of Pimelea ciliolaris (Threlfall) Rye.
- Pimelea octophylla subsp. petraea Meisn. Threlfall, is a synonym of Pimelea imbricata var. petrea (Meisn.) Rye.
- Pimelea octophylla subsp. subvillefera Threlfall, is a synonym of Pimelea subvellifera (Threlfall) Rye.

== Distribution and habitat ==
Woolly riceflower grows in sandy soil, usually over rock and is found between the Eyre Peninsula in South Australia and the Mornington Peninsula in Victoria and is locally common in western Victoria.
