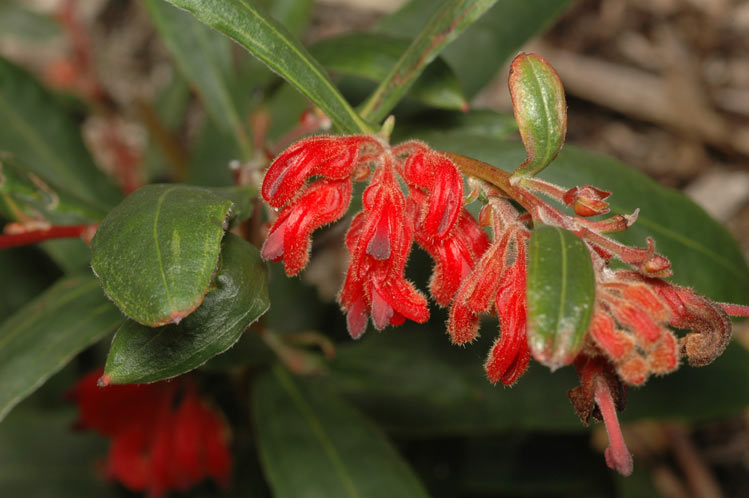
- Grevillea brachystylis in Kings Park, Western Australia

Conservation status
- Vulnerable (IUCN 3.1)

Scientific classification
- Kingdom: Plantae
- Clade: Tracheophytes
- Clade: Angiosperms
- Clade: Eudicots
- Order: Proteales
- Family: Proteaceae
- Genus: Grevillea
- Species: G. brachystylis

Binomial name
- Grevillea brachystylis Meisn.

= Grevillea brachystylis =

Short-styled grevillea

Species of shrub endemic to Western Australia

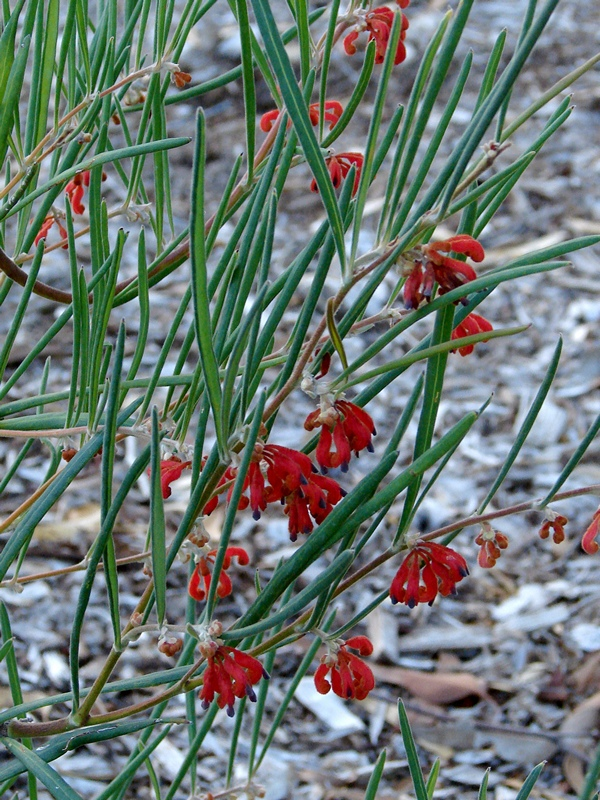
Subspecies australis in Kings Park

Grevillea brachystylis, also known as short-styled grevillea, is a species of flowering plant in the family Proteaceae and is endemic to the south-west of Western Australia. It is a low, spreading to erect shrub with linear to narrow egg-shaped leaves with the narrow end towards the base, and wheel-like clusters of hairy red flowers.

== Description ==
Grevillea brachystylis is a low, spreading to erect shrub that typically grows to a height of 0.3 to 1 metre (1.0 to 3.3 ft). The leaves are linear to narrow egg-shaped with the narrower end towards the base, 10 to 140 millimetres (0.4 to 5.5 in) long and 2 to 10 millimetres (0.08 to 0.39 in) wide with the edges turned down or rolled under. The flowers are arranged in wheel-like clusters on a rachis 2–7 mm (0.079–0.276 in) long, and are red and hairy. The pistil is 7–11 mm (0.28–0.43 in) long and hairy. Flowering occurs from June to November and the fruit is a woolly-hairy, narrow oval follicle 12–17 mm (0.47–0.67 in) long.

== Taxonomy ==
Grevillea brachystylis was first formally described in 1845 by Carl Meissner in Johann Georg Christian Lehmann's Plantae Preissianae from specimens collected in December 1839 by Ludwig Preiss near Busselton, Western Australia. The specific epithet (brachystylis) means "short style".

In 1990, Gregory John Keighery described two subspecies in the journal Nuytsia, and the names are accepted by the Australian Plant Census:

- Grevillea brachystylis subsp. australis Keighery has branches up to 2 m (6 ft 7 in) long and a purple pollen presenter;
- Grevillea brachystylis Meisn. subsp. brachystylis has branches 40–70 cm (16–28 in) long and a red or pale purple pollen presenter.

In 2009, Keighery described a third subspecies in The Western Australian Naturalist, and the name is also accepted by the Australian Plant Census:

- Grevillea brachystylis subsp. grandis Keighery has longer, wider leaves and a longer pedicel than the autonym.

== Distribution and habitat ==
Short-styled grevillea grows in swampy places and on stream banks in the Busselton and Scott River areas in the far south-west of Western Australia. Subspecies australis grows in heath and is restricted to the Scott River area, subsp. brachystylis grows in heath or woodland east of Busselton on the coastal plain and subsp. grandis grows in woodland on the Whicher Range.

== Conservation status ==
This species has been listed as vulnerable on the IUCN Red List of Threatened Species. This is due to its severely fragmented range, limited estimated extent of occurrence (EOO) and the continuing decline of both quality of habitat and number of mature individuals due to the clearance of roadside verges and the invasion of weeds where subpopulations occur. It is not known if G. brachystylis is susceptible to the plant pathogen Phytophtora which causes dieback disease.

Subspecies brachystylis is listed as priority three by the Government of Western Australia Department of Biodiversity, Conservation and Attractions, meaning that it is poorly known and known from only a few locations but is not under imminent threat, and subspecies australis and grandis are listed as threatened flora (declared rare flora — extant).

Subspecies grandis is also listed as critically endangered under the Australian Government Environment Protection and Biodiversity Conservation Act 1999, and a National Recovery Plan has been prepared. The main threats to the species include road maintenance, weed invasion and inappropriate fire regimes.
