= Leucopogon microcarpus =

Scientific classification
- Kingdom: Plantae
- Clade: Tracheophytes
- Clade: Angiosperms
- Clade: Eudicots
- Clade: Asterids
- Order: Ericales
- Family: Ericaceae
- Genus: Leucopogon
- Species: L. microcarpus

Binomial name
- Leucopogon microcarpus Hislop
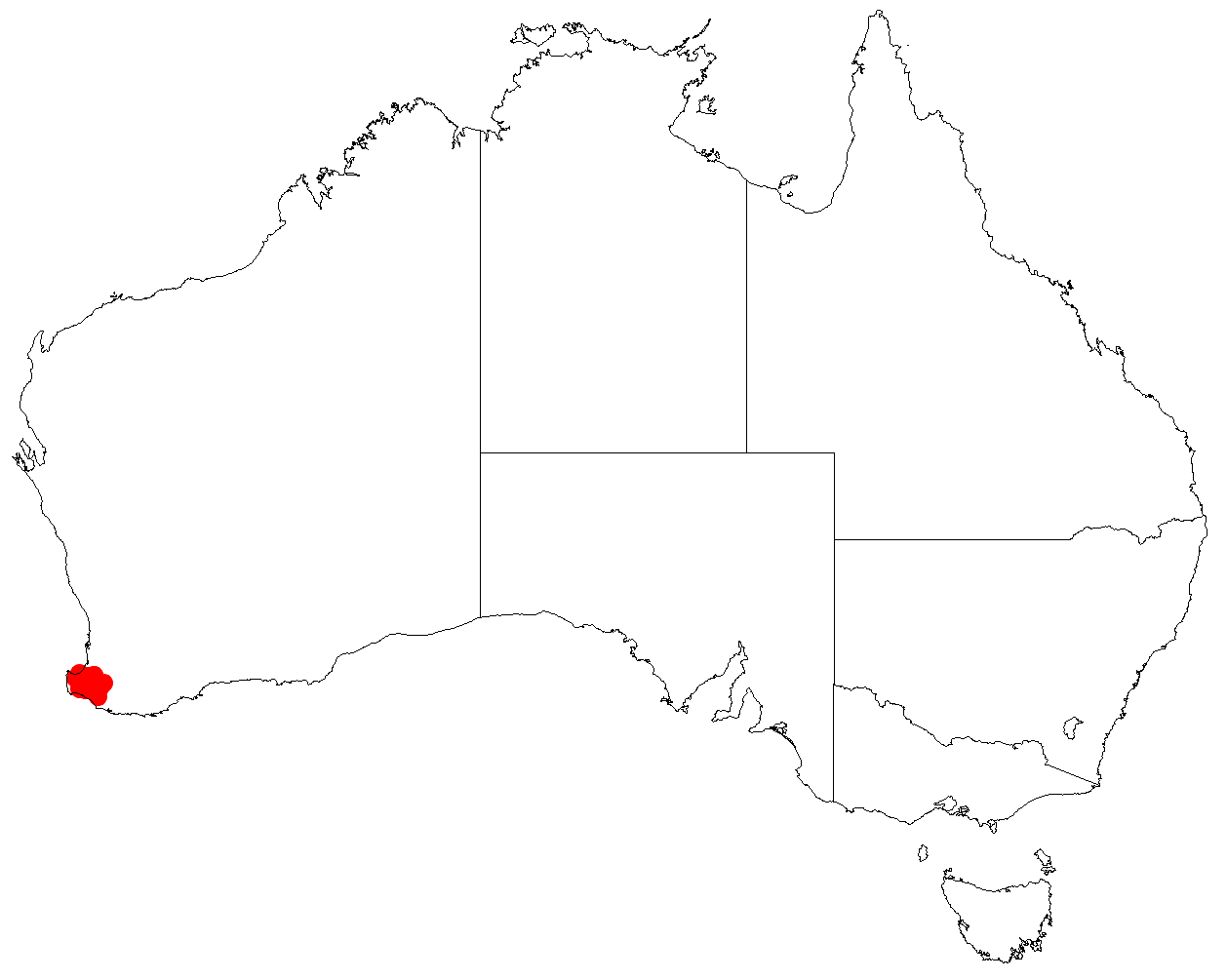
- Occurrence data from AVH

Species of plant

Leucopogon microcarpus is a species of flowering plant in the heath family Ericaceae and is endemic to the southwest of Western Australia. It is a low, compact shrub with hairy young branchlets, narrowly elliptic, narrowly egg-shaped or linear leaves and erect, compact clusters of 3 to 9 white, tube-shaped flowers in upper leaf axils or on the ends of branches.

== Description ==
Leucopogon microcarpus is a compact shrub that typically grows up to about 40 cm (16 in) high and wide, its young branchlets densely covered with straight hairs pressed against the surface. The leaves are narrowly elliptic, narrowly egg-shaped or linear, 3.8–8.5 mm (0.15–0.33 in) long and 0.7–2.3 mm (0.028–0.091 in) wide on a yellowish or pale brown petiole 0.4–1.2 mm (0.016–0.047 in) long. The edges of the leaves are usually turned down or rolled under, the lower surface a paler shade of green. The flowers are arranged in groups of 3 to 9 at the ends of branchlets or in upper leaf axils, with egg-shaped bracts 1.0–2.4 mm (0.039–0.094 in) long, and broadly egg-shaped bracteoles 1.7–2.1 mm (0.067–0.083 in) long, the sepals egg-shaped or narrowly egg-shaped and 2.4–3.5 mm (0.094–0.138 in) long. The petals are white, joined at the base to form a bell-shaped or broadly bell-shaped tube 1.1–1.7 mm (0.043–0.067 in) long, the lobes widely spreading, curved backwards, 1.8–2.9 mm (0.071–0.114 in) long and densely bearded. Flowering mainly occurs from August to October and the fruit is a more or less spherical drupe 0.8–1.0 mm (0.031–0.039 in) long.

== Taxonomy and naming ==
Leucopogon microcarpus was first formally described in 2012 by Michael Clyde Hislop in the journal Nuytsia from specimens he collected near Nannup in 2004. The specific epithet (microcarpus) means "small fruit".

== Distribution and habitat ==
This leucopogon almost always grows in jarrah forest and occurs on and near the Whicher Range in the Jarrah Forest, Swan Coastal Plain and Warren bioregions of southwestern Western Australia.

== Conservation status ==
Leucopogon microcarpus is listed as "not threatened" by the Government of Western Australia Department of Biodiversity, Conservation and Attractions.
