= Boronia anceps =

Conservation status
- Priority Three — Poorly Known Taxa (DEC)

Scientific classification
- Kingdom: Plantae
- Clade: Tracheophytes
- Clade: Angiosperms
- Clade: Eudicots
- Clade: Rosids
- Order: Sapindales
- Family: Rutaceae
- Genus: Boronia
- Species: B. anceps

Binomial name
- Boronia anceps Paul G.Wilson
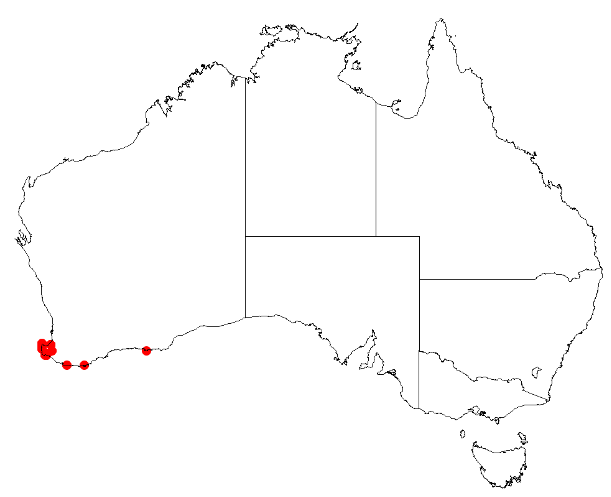
- Occurrence data from Australasian Virtual Herbarium

Species of flowering plant

Boronia anceps is a plant in the citrus family, Rutaceae and is endemic to a small area in the south-west of Western Australia. It is a perennial herb with small leaves and pink, four-petalled flowers.

== Description ==
Boronia anceps is a perennial herb that grows to a height of 60 cm (20 in), has flattened stems and lacks a lignotuber. Its leaves are narrow egg-shaped to narrow oblong about 20 mm (0.8 in) long although those near the top are very reduced. The flowers are pink or pinkish purple and are borne in a cyme on the tip of the stems. The groups of flowers are on a thin peduncle up to 60 mm (2 in) long, each flower on a thin pedicel 5–10 mm (0.2–0.4 in) long. The four sepals are dark red, narrow triangular to broadly egg-shaped and 2–4 mm (0.08–0.2 in) long. The four petals are broadly egg-shaped and about 8 mm (0.3 in) long with their bases overlapping. The style and stigma are continuous. Flowering occurs from September to December or January.

== Taxonomy and naming ==
Boronia anceps was first formally described in 1998 by Paul G. Wilson and the description was published in Nuytsia from a specimen collected near a crossing on the Scott River near Augusta. The specific epithet (anceps) is a Latin word meaning "two-sided", referring to the shape of the stem.

== Distribution and habitat ==
This boronia grows in seasonally swampy heath and is only known from between the Scott River and Walpole.

== Conservation ==
Boronia anceps is classified as "Priority Two" by the Government of Western Australia Department of Parks and Wildlife meaning that it is poorly known and known from only a few locations but is not under imminent threat.
