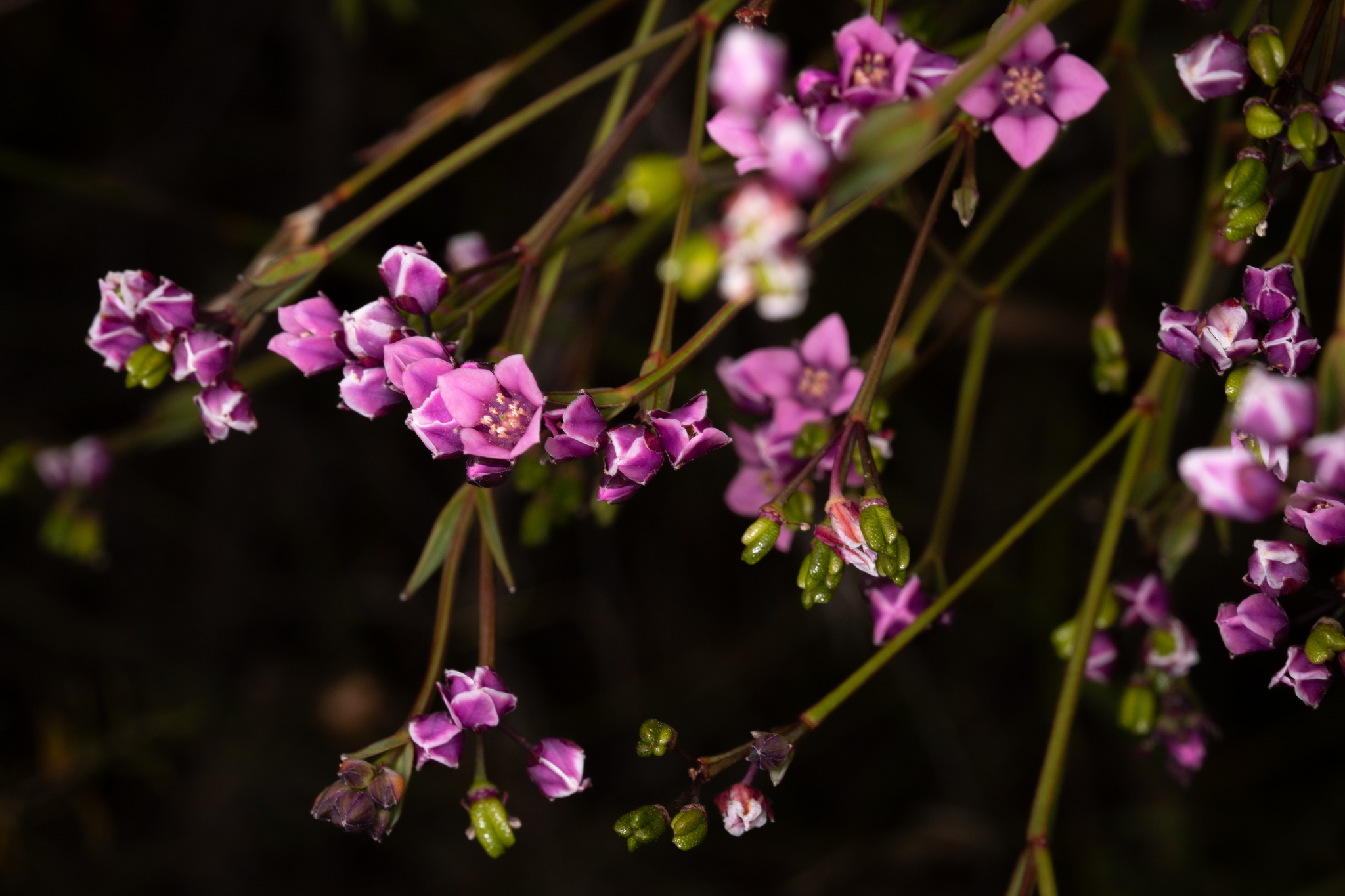

Conservation status
- Priority Three — Poorly Known Taxa (DEC)

Scientific classification
- Kingdom: Plantae
- Clade: Tracheophytes
- Clade: Angiosperms
- Clade: Eudicots
- Clade: Rosids
- Order: Sapindales
- Family: Rutaceae
- Genus: Boronia
- Species: B. tetragona

Binomial name
- Boronia tetragona Paul G.Wilson

= Boronia tetragona =

Species of flowering plant

Boronia tetragona is a species of plant in the citrus family, Rutaceae, and is endemic to a small area of the southwest of Western Australia. It is an erect, glabrous, perennial herb with simple, sessile leaves and pink, four-petalled flowers.

== Description ==
Boronia tetragona is an erect, glabrous, perennial herb that grows to a height of 70 cm (28 in). Its stems are more or less square in cross-section with a smooth, sharp rib on each corner. The leaves are sessile, elliptic to egg-shaped or triangular, up to 40 mm (1.6 in) long and have warty edges. The flowers are borne in umbels on the ends of the branches on a thin peduncle up to 20 mm (0.79 in) long, the individual flowers on a thin pedicel up to 10 mm (0.39 in) long. There are smooth, dark red bracts at the base of the flowers. The four sepals are dark red and about 3 mm (0.12 in) long. The four petals are pink with a darker midline, egg-shaped and about 7 mm (0.3 in) long with a rounded tip. The eight stamens have warty glands near the tip. Flowering occurs from October to December.

== Taxonomy and naming ==
Boronia tetragona was first formally described in 1998 by Paul Wilson and the description was published in Nuytsia from a specimen collected by Gregory John Keighery near Busselton. Wilson derived the specific epithet (tetragona) from the Greek words tetra meaning "four" and gona meaning "angle", referring to the four-sided branches. Other sources give tessares (τέσσαρες) and gōnia (γωνία) as the Greek words for "four" and "angle".

== Distribution and habitat ==
This boronia grows in open woodland sometimes with sedges, between Capel and the Whicher Range in the Jarrah Forest and Swan Coastal Plain biogeographic regions.

== Conservation ==
Boronia tetragona is classified as "Priority Three" by the Government of Western Australia Department of Parks and Wildlife, meaning that it is poorly known and known from only a few locations but is not under imminent threat.
