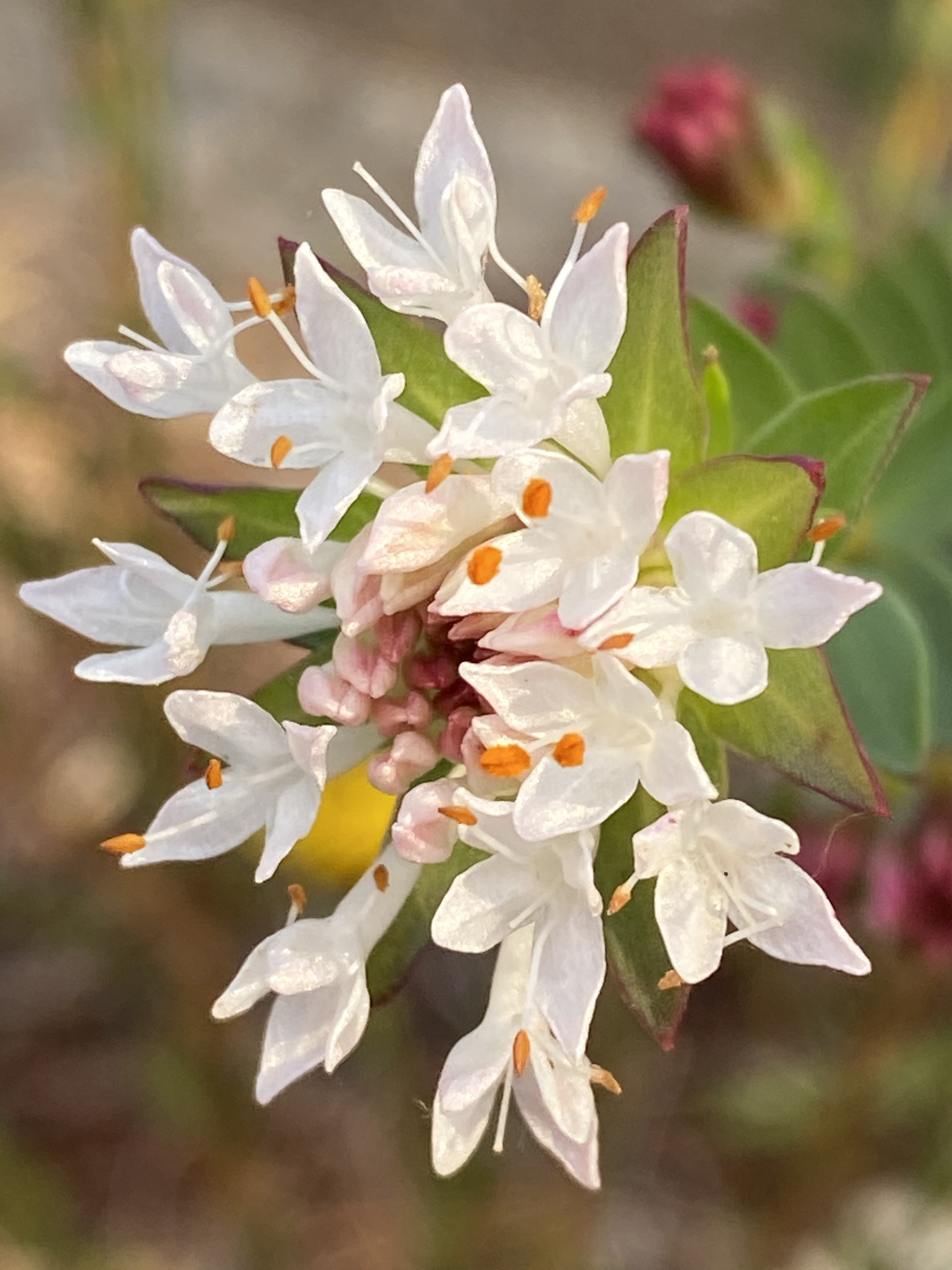

Scientific classification
- Kingdom: Plantae
- Clade: Tracheophytes
- Clade: Angiosperms
- Clade: Eudicots
- Clade: Rosids
- Order: Malvales
- Family: Thymelaeaceae
- Genus: Pimelea
- Species: P. ciliata

Binomial name
- Pimelea ciliata Rye

= Pimelea ciliata =

Species of flowering plant

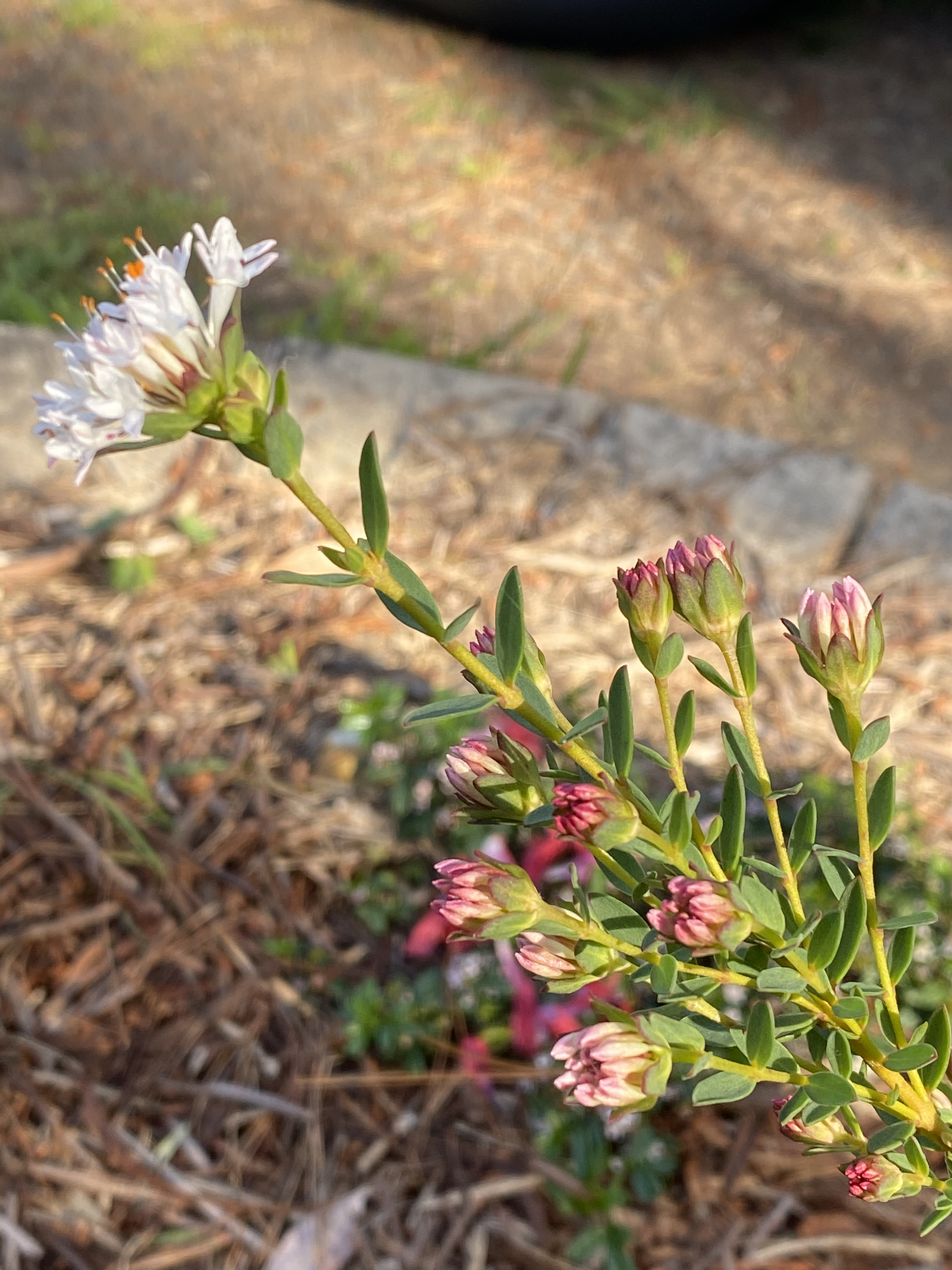
Pimelea ciliata foliage

Pimelea ciliata, commonly known as white banjine, is a species of flowering plant in the family Thymelaeaceae. It is a small shrub with white flowers and is endemic to Western Australia.

== Description ==
Pimelea ciliata is a small shrub usually 0.5–1 m (1 ft 8 in – 3 ft 3 in) high with almost linear or egg-shaped to narrowly obovate leaves, 5–22 mm (0.20–0.87 in) long, 1.5–7 mm (0.059–0.276 in) wide, margins sometimes rolled under or upward on a short petiole about 1 mm (0.039 in) long, ending with a pointed apex. The leaves are arranged in alternating pairs at right angles to the ones above and below so that the leaves are in 4 rows along the stems (decussate), upper surface is darker than the underside. The stems at the apex are orange-red to brownish becoming grey as they age. The erect inflorescence consists of several light pink or white bisexual flowers, smooth inside, pedicel 1–2 mm (0.039–0.079 in) long, four to six egg-shaped bracts, 8–13 mm (0.31–0.51 in) long, 5–10 mm (0.20–0.39 in) wide with small hairs on the edges. The flower stamens are marginally or greater in length than the sepals. Flowering occurs from August to December.

== Taxonomy ==
Pimelea ciliata was first formally described in 1984 by Barbara Lynette Rye in the journal Nuytsia.

== Distribution and habitat ==
White banjine grows in the south-west corner of Western Australia near Bindoon to near Margaret River and south-east to the Porongurup Range mostly on hills and breakaways in clay, sand, loam, granitic and lateritic soil.
