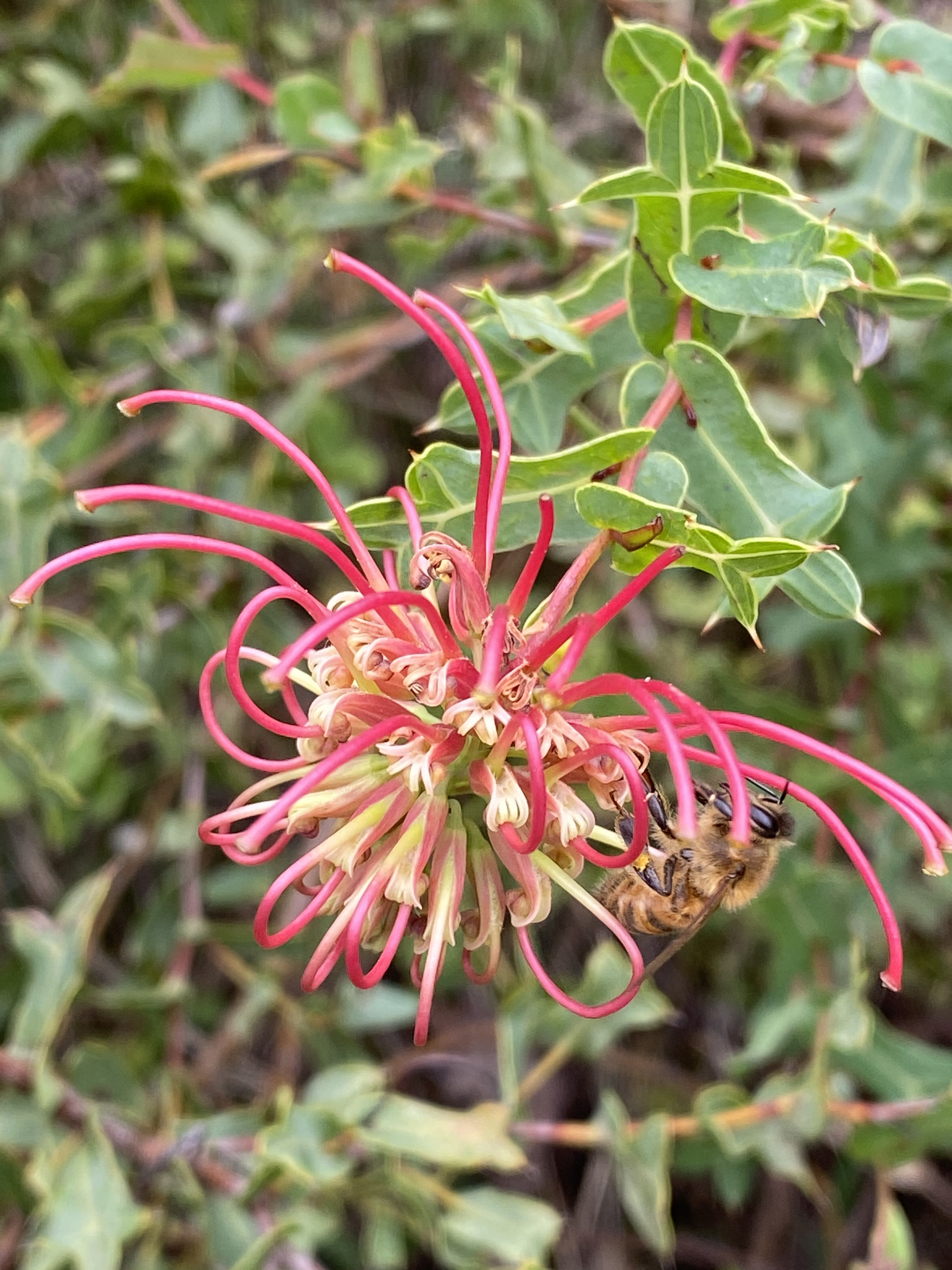

Conservation status
- Critically Endangered (IUCN 3.1)

- Endangered (EPBC Act)

Scientific classification
- Kingdom: Plantae
- Clade: Embryophytes
- Clade: Tracheophytes
- Clade: Angiosperms
- Clade: Eudicots
- Order: Proteales
- Family: Proteaceae
- Genus: Grevillea
- Species: G. maccutcheonii

Binomial name
- Grevillea maccutcheonii Keighery & Cranfield

= Grevillea maccutcheonii =

Species of shrub endemic to Western Australia

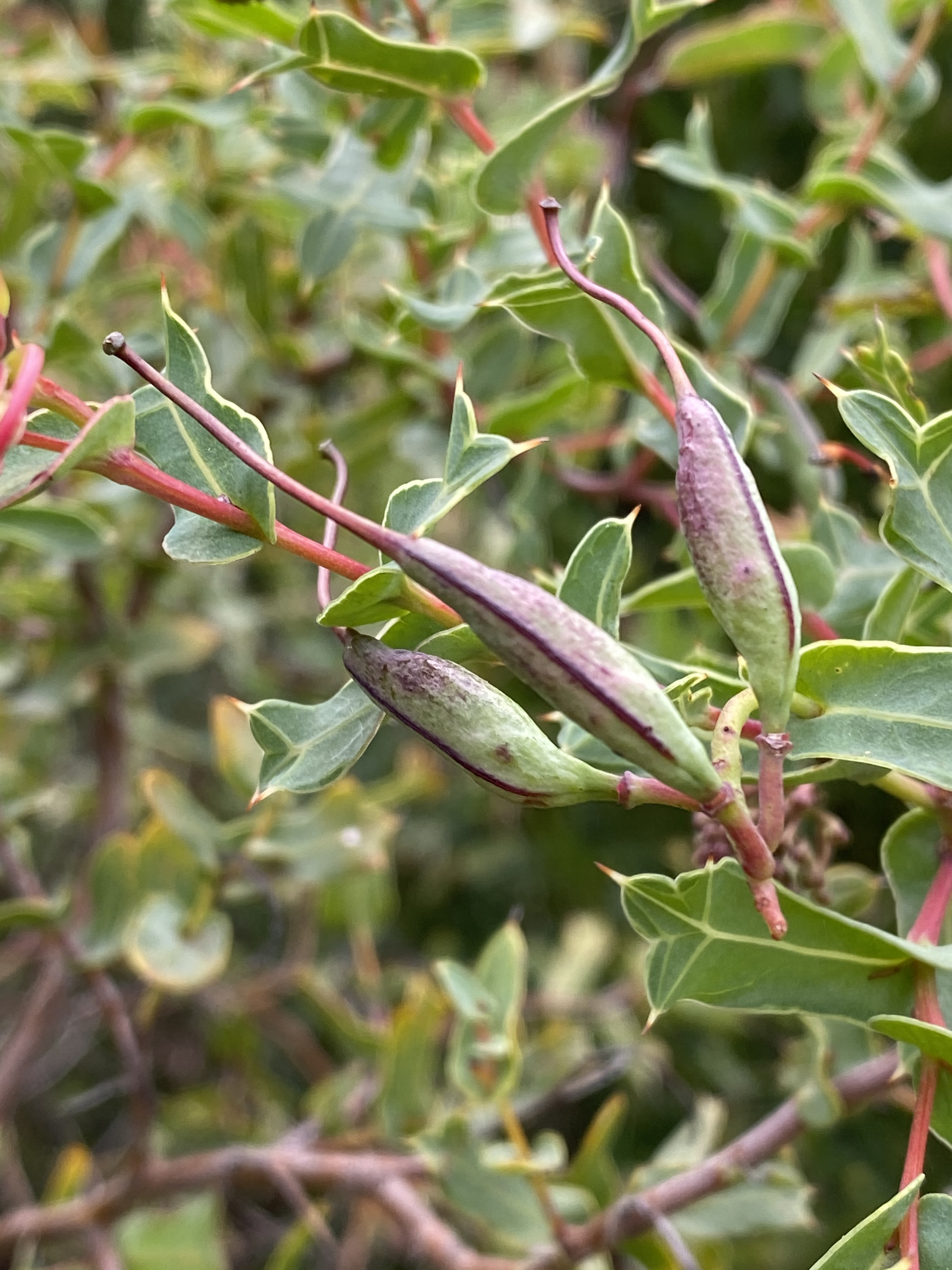
Fruit

Grevillea maccutcheonii, commonly known as McCutcheon's grevillea, is a species of flowering plant in the family Proteaceae and is endemic to a single location in the south-west of Western Australia. It is a densely-branched shrub with three-lobed, stem-clasping leaves, and clusters of reddish-green flowers. The total population of the species was estimated in 2007 to be seven mature plants.

== Description ==
Grevillea maccutcheonii is a densely-branched shrub that typically grows to 2 m (6 ft 7 in) high and 3 m (9.8 ft) wide and has ridged branchlets. The leaves are mostly 10–25 mm (0.39–0.98 in) long, 7–15 mm (0.28–0.59 in) wide, stem-clasping and more or less cross-shaped in outline, with three spiny lobes. Sometimes the leaves are simple and fiddle-shaped with three teeth near the tip. The edges of the leaves are wavy and both surfaces are glabrous. The flowers are arranged in erect clusters of 26 to 28 on one side of a glabrous rachis 5–10 mm (0.20–0.39 in) long. The flowers are reddish green, the pistil 28–30 mm (1.1–1.2 in) long. Flowering occurs in most months with a peak from July to November, and the fruit is a glabrous, narrowly oval follicle 13–17 mm (0.51–0.67 in) long.

== Taxonomy ==
Grevillea maccutcheonii was first formally described in 1996 by Greg Keighery and Raymond Cranfield in the journal Nuytsia from specimens collected by Keighery near Busselton in 1993. The specific epithet (maccutcheonii) honours Graham McCutcheon, an ecologist previously in the Western Australia Government Department of Conservation and Land Management. The epithet is spelt maccutcheonii, according to the International Code of Nomenclature for algae, fungi, and plants.

== Distribution and habitat ==
McCutcheon's grevillea is restricted to the foot of the Whicher Range where it grows in moist, tall shrubland.

== Conservation status ==
This grevillea is listed as endangered under the Australian Government Environment Protection and Biodiversity Conservation Act 1999 and as threatened by the Western Australian Government Department of Biodiversity, Conservation and Attractions, meaning that it is in danger of extinction. The main threats to the species include habitat degradation, road maintenance, weed invasion and grazing by rabbits. The total population of mature plants was estimated to be seven in 2007, and a single disturbance event could destroy the entire wild population.

== Use in horticulture ==
Unlike many Western Australian plants, McCutcheon's grevillea adapts well to cultivation, even in the eastern states, where summer humidity is often high. It grows best in well-drained soil in a sunny location.
