= Grevillea brachystylis subsp. grandis =

Large-flowered short-styled grevillea

Conservation status
- Critically endangered (EPBC Act)

Scientific classification
- Kingdom: Plantae
- Clade: Embryophytes
- Clade: Tracheophytes
- Clade: Spermatophytes
- Clade: Angiosperms
- Clade: Eudicots
- Order: Proteales
- Family: Proteaceae
- Genus: Grevillea
- Species: G. brachystylis
- Subspecies: G. b. subsp. grandis

Trinomial name
- Grevillea brachystylis subsp. grandis Keighery

Subspecies of flowering plant

Grevillea brachystylis grandis, commonly known as large-flowered short-styled grevillea, is a subspecies of Grevillea brachystylis.

== Description ==
G. brachystylis grandis typically grows to a height of 0.3 to 1 metre (1.0 to 3.3 ft), has non-glaucous branchlets and simple leaves 70 to 120 millimetres (2.8 to 4.7 in) long and 2 to 10 millimetres (0.08 to 0.39 in) wide. It produces irregular red inflorescence from August to September.

== Distribution ==
The shrub is endemic to a small area along the west coast of the South West region of Western Australia. It grows among medium to high trees and shrubland in loamy or sandy soils. It occupies an area of approximately 10 square kilometres (2,471 acres) in an area in the Whicher Range south of Busselton mainly in areas infested with Watsonia meriana var. bulbillifera and Juncus microcephalus.

== Conservation ==
The subspecies is only found in six fragmented locations, road reserves between areas cleared for agriculture. It species is listed as critically endangered in Western Australia in 2002. In 2005 the estimated population following surveys was 176 plants.

=== Translocation program ===
1000 seeds were collected from existing populations between 2009 and 2012. A total of 92 seedlings in 2012 and 172 in 2013 were planted at a secure site within a nature reserve close to the existing populations. The translocation worked well with 97 to 99% of the plants surviving after the first two years, 95% of them flowering and 80% bearing fruit.
