= Whicher National Park =

National park in Western Australia

- IUCN category II (national park)
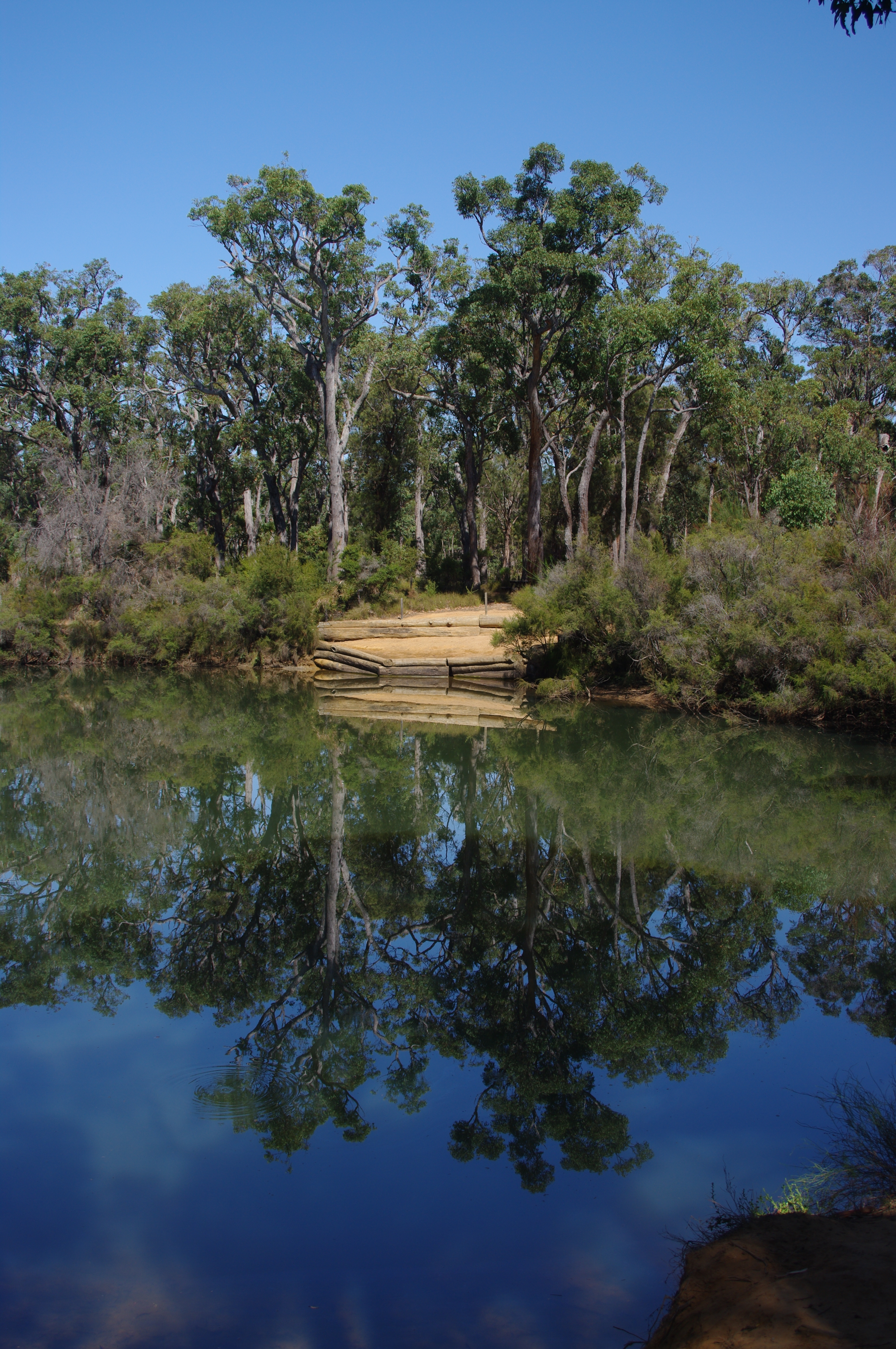
- Cane Brake Pool

- Location within Western Australia
- Location: Western Australia
- Nearest city: Nannup
- Coordinates: 33°45′S 115°41′E
- Established: 2019
- Governing body: Department of Parks and Wildlife (Western Australia)
- Website: Official website

Whicher National Park is a National Park in the Whicher Range of the South West region of Western Australia. The park is home to the protected Petrophile shrub and the source of the Margaret River.

It is located in the Jarrah Forest and Warren bioregions.

== See also ==
- List of protected areas of Western Australia
