= Acacia tayloriana =

Conservation status
- Priority Four — Rare Taxa (DEC)

Scientific classification
- Kingdom: Plantae
- Clade: Tracheophytes
- Clade: Angiosperms
- Clade: Eudicots
- Clade: Rosids
- Order: Fabales
- Family: Fabaceae
- Subfamily: Caesalpinioideae
- Clade: Mimosoid clade
- Genus: Acacia
- Species: A. tayloriana

Binomial name
- Acacia tayloriana F.Muell.
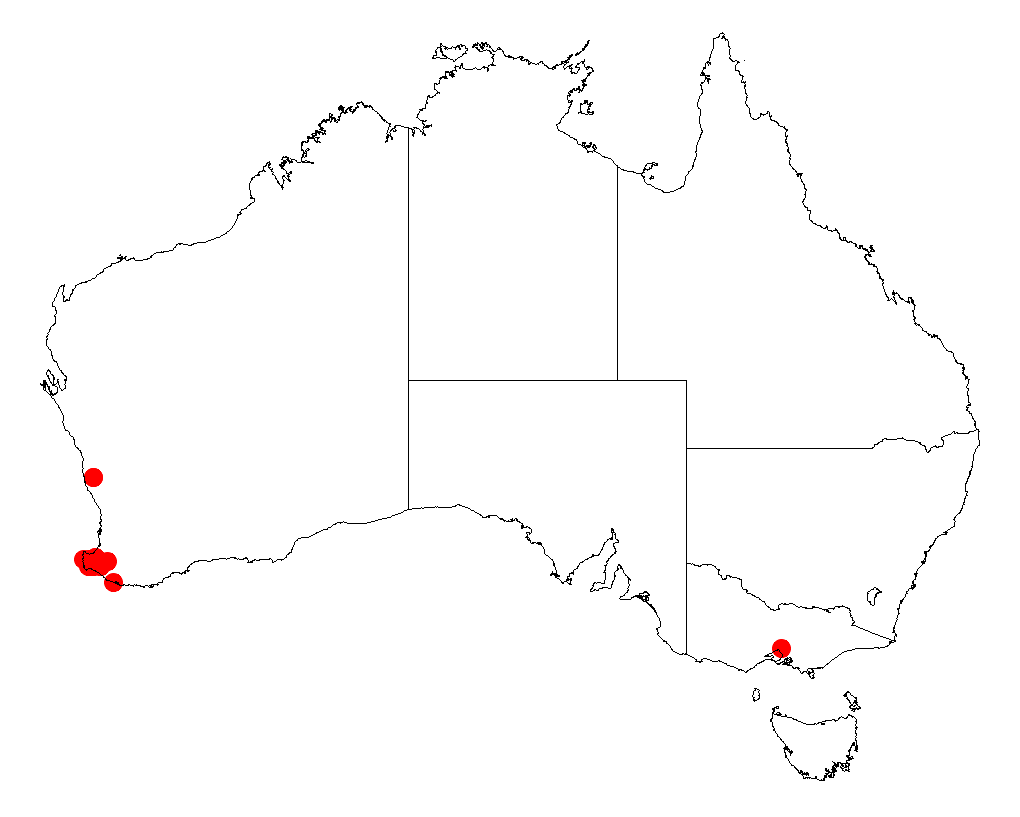
- Occurrence data from AVH

Species of legume

Acacia tayloriana is a shrub of the genus Acacia and the subgenus Pulchellae that is endemic to a small area of south western Australia

== Description ==
The prostrate evergreen shrub and has hairy branchlets with oblong to elliptic stipules. It can grow to a height of around 0.3 m (1 ft 0 in) and a widthup to about 1 m (3 ft 3 in). The leaves are composed of one to three pairs of pinnae that have a length of 10 to 20 mm (0.39 to 0.79 in) that each contain three to five pairs of elliptic to narrowly oblong or narrowly elliptic green pinnules that are 5 to 11 mm (0.20 to 0.43 in) in length and 3 to 5 mm (0.12 to 0.20 in) wide and have a prominent midrib and two or three minor longitudinal nerves. It blooms in January and produces cream-white flowers. The simple inflorescence occur singly in the axils on 25 to 50 mm (0.98 to 1.97 in) long hairy peduncles and have spherical flower-heads globular containing about 20 creamy white coloured flowers. The glabrous to subglabrous reticulate seed pods that form after flowering have a length of 1 to 3 cm (0.39 to 1.18 in) and a width of 6 to 8 mm (0.24 to 0.31 in) with longitudinally to transversely arranged seeds inside.

== Taxonomy ==
the species was first formally described by the botanist Ferdinand von Mueller as a part of the work Definitions of some new Australian plants as published in Southern Science Record. It was reclassified as Racosperma taylorianum by Leslie Pedley in 2003 then transferred back to genus Acacia in 2006. It is closely related to Acacia preissiana.

== Distribution ==
It is native to an area in the South West region of Western Australia where it is found in damp locations growing in clay-loam or sandy lateritic soils. It has a limited range around the Blackwood River to the north east of Augusta as a part of Eucalyptus marginata forest communities.

== Cultivation ==
The shrub is suitable for planting in suits cottage, bush and mediterranean garden designs as a border, groundcover, spillover or in hanging baskets. It is fast growing, attracts native animals and is drought tolerant and copes with high wind and a light frost. It prefers a sunny position and damp or dry well drained soils.

== See also ==
- List of Acacia species
