= Sabina River =

River in Western Australia

Coordinates: 33°38′39″S 115°24′0″E

Location
- Country: Australia

Physical characteristics
- Source
  - location: Whicher Range
  - elevation: 76 metres (249 ft)
- Mouth
  - location: Vasse Estuary
  - elevation: sea level
- Length: 18 km (11 mi)
- Basin size: 49 km^{2} (19 sq mi)

The Sabina River is a river in the South West region of Western Australia.

The headwaters of the river rise in the Whicher Range near the edge of the Millbrook State Forest and then flowing in the northerly direction. The river crosses the Vasse Highway then Sues Road and finally Bussell Highway before discharging into Vasse Estuary near Busselton and finally into the Indian Ocean via Wonnerup Inlet and Geographe Bay.

Construction of a bridge over the Abba and Sabina rivers commenced in 1860, despite dreadful weather, and the rivers running high at the time. The Abba and Sabina rivers were part of drainage systems being worked on in the early 1900s. In the 2000s further management plans were being worked upon for the two rivers as part of the Geographe catchment.
