= Vasse, Western Australia =

Suburb of Busselton, Western Australia

Vasse
- Suburb
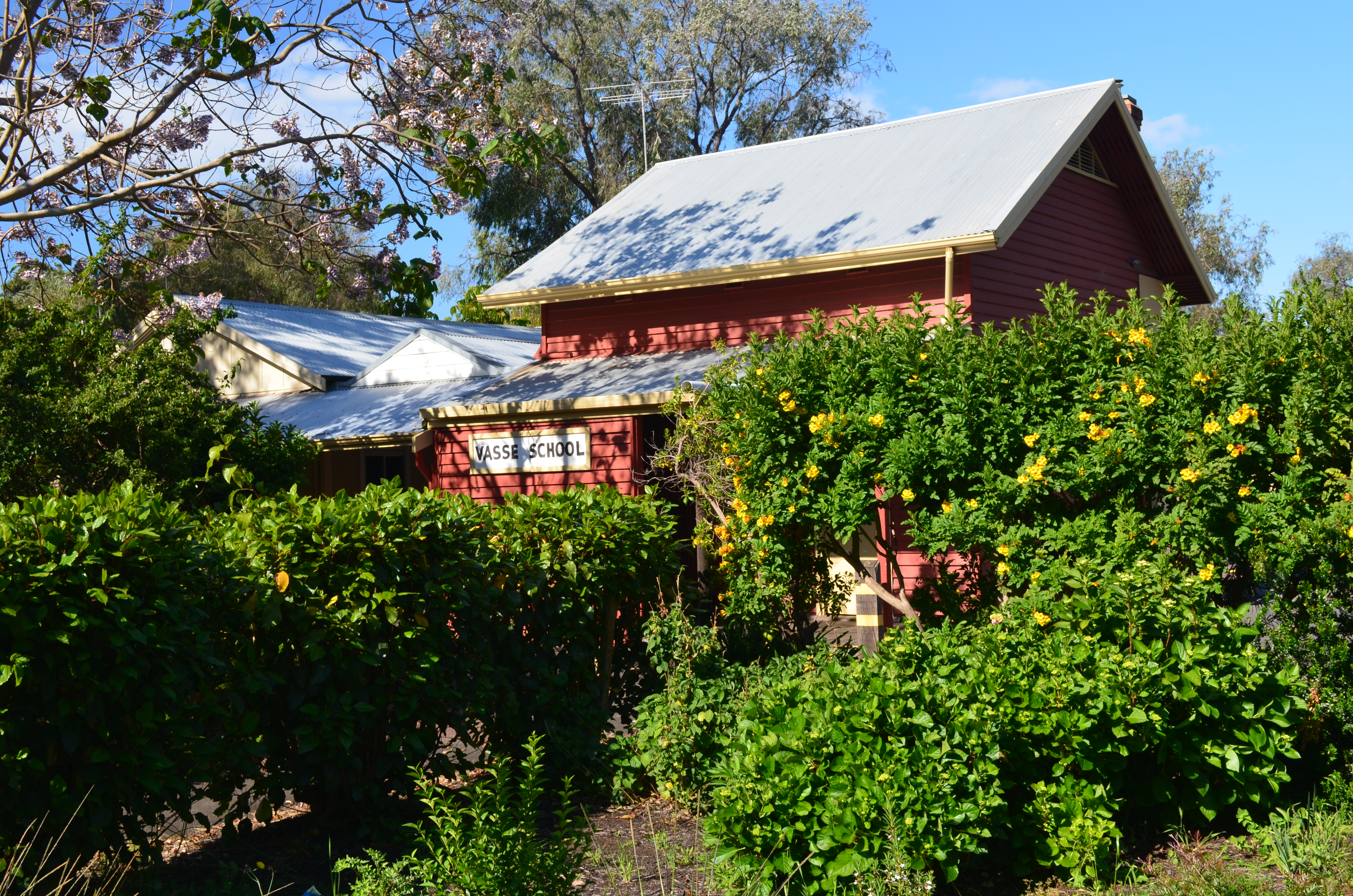
- Old Vasse Primary School Precinct, 2013.

- Coordinates: 33.69°S 115.3°E
- Country: Australia
- State: Western Australia
- LGA(s): City of Busselton
- Location: 240 km (150 mi) SW of Perth; 10 km (6.2 mi) W of Busselton
- Established: 1927

Government
  - State electorate(s): Vasse
  - Federal division(s): Forrest

Area
  - Total: 36.1 km^{2} (13.9 sq mi)

Population
  - Total(s): 2,853 (SAL 2021)
- Postcode: 6280

Vasse is a suburb of the city of Busselton in the South West region of Western Australia, 10 kilometres (6 mi) west of Busselton and 240 kilometres (149 mi) southwest of Perth. Its local government area is the City of Busselton. At the 2021 census, Vasse had a population of 2,853.

The area was originally inhabited by the Wardandi people. Hurford and Penney seem to have had a bay whaling operation in Geographe Bay in 1846.

The town is named after the Vasse River and Vasse Estuary, both of which in turn are named after French seaman Thomas Vasse, who disappeared in the area in June 1801 during Nicolas Baudin's expedition. The townsite of Vasse was gazetted in 1927; the area had previously been known as Newtown. A hall (originally known as Newtown Hall) was built in 1898, while the Old Vasse Primary School was constructed in 1901 and replaced by a newer school on the same site in 1960; the present cite was in use as a school as early as 1884 and there was a public school in the area in 1869.

The population of Vasse was around 75 according to a 2001 estimate. It was predominantly a farming area until the establishment of a housing estate in 2004. Along with the government primary school, Vasse is also serviced by a high school at Cape Naturaliste College (established in 2008). On 1 August 2023, the boundary between Vasse and Kealy was moved north to Bussell Highway for easier recognition.
