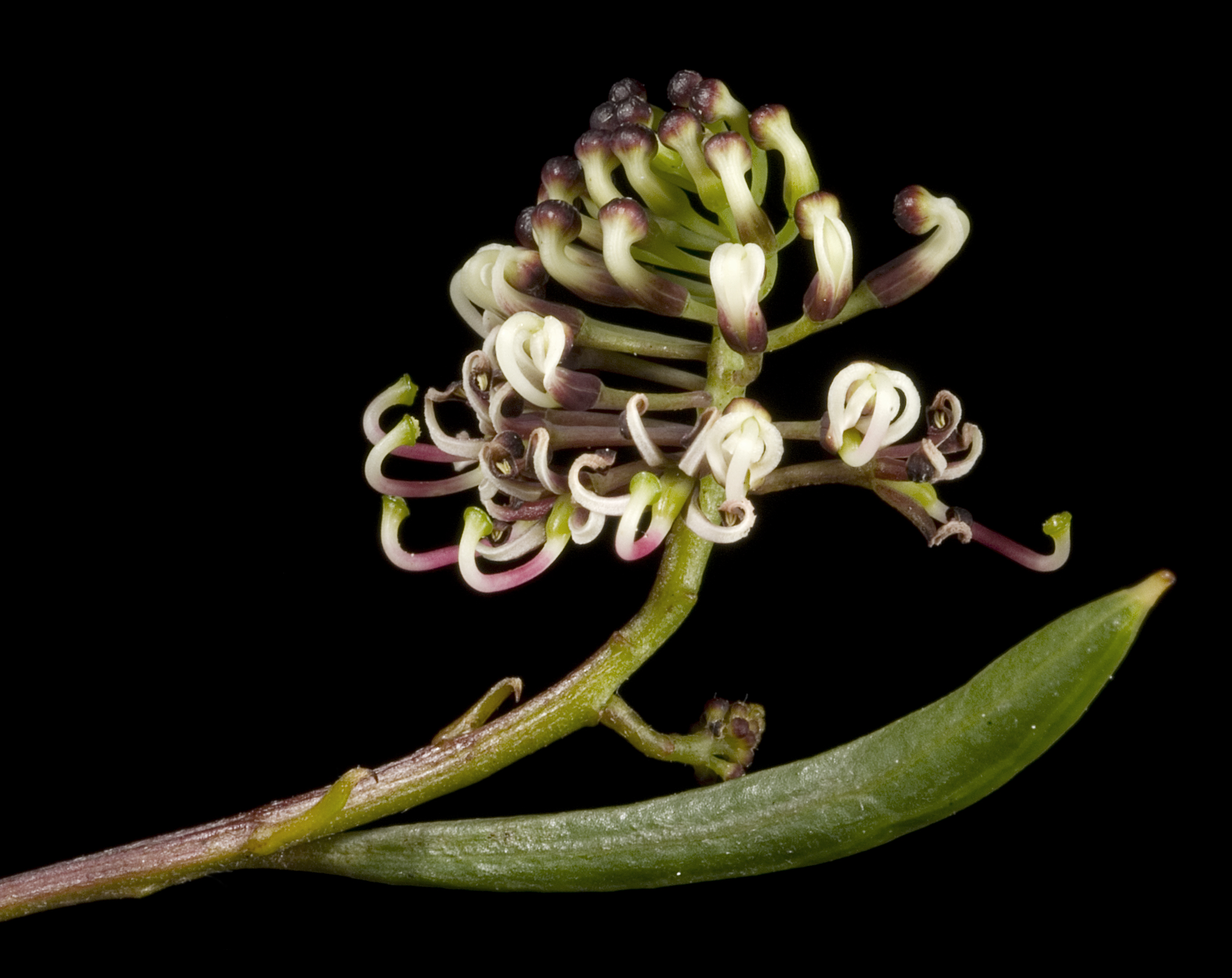

Conservation status
- Priority Three — Poorly Known Taxa (DEC)

Scientific classification
- Kingdom: Plantae
- Clade: Tracheophytes
- Clade: Angiosperms
- Clade: Eudicots
- Order: Proteales
- Family: Proteaceae
- Genus: Grevillea
- Species: G. papillosa

Binomial name
- Grevillea papillosa (McGill.) Olde & Marriott

Synonyms
- Grevillea diversifolia var. lobata Meisn.; Grevillea manglesioides subsp. papillosa McGill.

= Grevillea papillosa =

Species of shrub endemic to Western Australia

Grevillea papillosa is a species of flowering plant in the family Proteaceae and is endemic to the South West region of Western Australia. It is a spreading shrub with narrowly elliptic to linear, as well as deeply divided leaves, and pink-tinged, white flowers with a reddish-pink style.

== Description ==
Grevillea papillosa is a spreading shrub that typically grows to a height of 0.3–1.2 m (1 ft 0 in – 3 ft 11 in), its branchlets more or less glabrous. Its leaves are erect, linear to narrowly elliptic, 25–45 mm (0.98–1.77 in) long, sometimes deeply divided with three lobes 5–20 mm (0.20–0.79 in) long and 1–2 mm (0.039–0.079 in) wide. The edges of the leaves are rolled under partly enclosing the glabrous lower surface. The flowers are arranged on one side of a glabrous rachis 3–7 mm (0.12–0.28 in) long. The flowers are white with a pink tinge, the style pinkish red and the pistil 6.0–7.5 mm (0.24–0.30 in) long. Flowering mainly occurs from December to April and the fruit is an elliptic follicle.

== Taxonomy ==
This grevillea was first formally described in 1986 by Donald McGillivray who gave it the name Grevillea manglesioides subsp. papillosa, in his book New Names in Grevillea (Proteaceae) from specimens collected by Barbara Briggs near Pemberton in 1976. In 1994, Peter Olde and Neil Marriott raised the subspecies to species status as G. papillosa in The Grevillea Book. The specific epithet (papillosa) means "papillose", referring to the inside of the perianth.

== Distribution and habitat ==
Grevillea papillosa grows in winter-wet areas and in swamps between Nannup and the Scott River in the Jarrah Forest and Warren bioregions of south-western Western Australia.

== Conservation status ==
This grevillea is listed as "Priority Three" by the Government of Western Australia Department of Biodiversity, Conservation and Attractions, meaning that it is poorly known and known from only a few locations but is not under imminent threat.

== See also ==
- List of Grevillea species
