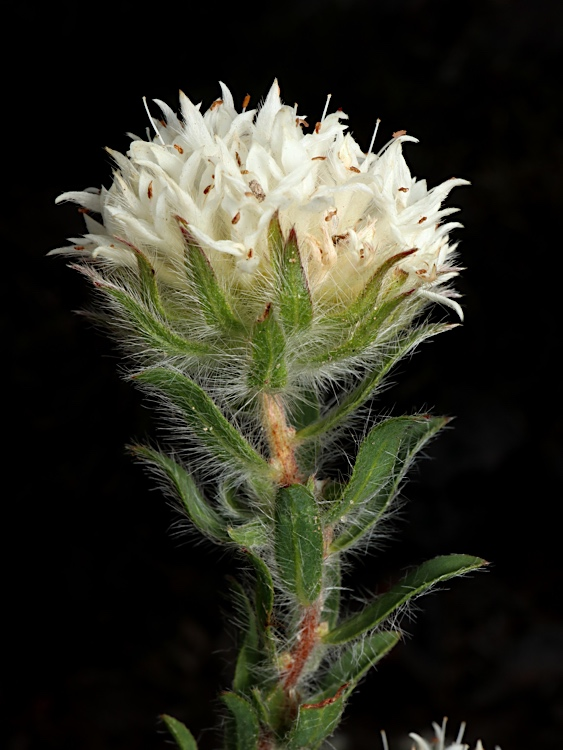
- Variety piligera

Scientific classification
- Kingdom: Plantae
- Clade: Tracheophytes
- Clade: Angiosperms
- Clade: Eudicots
- Clade: Rosids
- Order: Malvales
- Family: Thymelaeaceae
- Genus: Pimelea
- Species: P. imbricata

Binomial name
- Pimelea imbricata R.Br.

Synonyms
- Banksia imbricata (R.Br.) Kuntze; ? Pimelea nana var. glabrifolia Meisn.; Pimelea microcephala auct. non R.Br.: Meisner, C.D.F. in Lehmann, J.G.C. (ed.)

= Pimelea imbricata =

Species of shrub

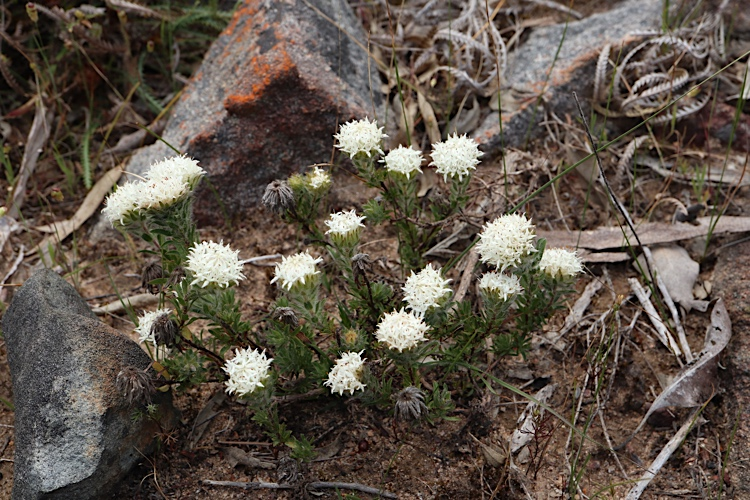
Habit of var. piligera in Kalamunda National Park

Pimelea imbricata is a species of flowering plant in the family Thymelaeaceae and is native to the southwest of Western Australia and south-eastern South Australia. It is a shrub with narrowly elliptic leaves and erect, compact clusters of white or pink flowers surrounded by 10 to 22 green or red to purple involucral bracts.

== Description ==
Pimelea imbricata is a shrub that typically grows to a height of 0.2–1.5 m (7.9 in – 4 ft 11.1 in). The leaves are more or less narrowly elliptic, 1–16 mm (0.039–0.630 in) long and 0.6–5 mm (0.024–0.197 in) wide on a short petiole. The flowers are arranged in compact clusters, surrounded by 10 to 22 involucral bracts that are 5–12 mm (0.20–0.47 in) long, 1–5 mm (0.039–0.197 in) wide and green, sometimes partly red to purple. The sepals are 1.5–3.3 mm (0.059–0.130 in) long and hairy on the outside. Flowering occurs from August to March with a peak from September to January.

== Taxonomy ==
Pimelea imbricata was first formally described in 1810 by Robert Brown in his book Prodromus Florae Novae Hollandiae et Insulae Van Diemen. The specific epithet (imbricata) means "imbricate".

The names of 5 varieties of P. imbricata have been accepted by the Australian Plant Census:

- Pimelea imbricata R.Br. var. imbricata has stems that are hairy near the pale to deep pink flowers, the style part of the floral tube densely hairy.
- Pimelea imbricata var. major (Meisn.) Rye has glabrous stems, the style part of the floral tube sparsely to moderately hairy.
- Pimelea imbricata var. petraea (Meisn.) Rye has stems that are hairy near the usually white or cream-coloured flowers, the floral tube 8–11 mm (0.31–0.43 in) long, and the style part of the floral tube densely hairy.
- Pimelea imbricata var. piligera (Benth.) Diels has stems that are hairy near the usually white or cream-coloured flowers, the floral tube usually 6–10 mm (0.24–0.39 in) long, and the style part of the floral tube densely hairy.
- Pimelea imbricata var. simulans Rye has glabrous stems, white flowers, the floral tube 4.5–6 mm (0.18–0.24 in) long, and the style part of the floral tube densely hairy.

== Distribution and habitat ==
This pimelea is widespread in the south-west of Western Australia and the south-east of South Australia. The variety imbricata grows on granite outcrops and in swamps from near Point D'Entrecasteaux east to Albany in the Avon Wheatbelt, Esperance Plains, Jarrah Forest, Mallee and Warren bioregions of south-western Australia. Variety major is restricted to the coastal plain, growing in winter-wet areas and temporary watercourses from near Gingin to Serpentine in the Jarrah Forest and Swan Coastal Plain bioregions. Variety petraea occurs in the south-east of South Australia, including on the Eyre and Yorke Peninsulas, Kangaroo Island and Flinders Ranges. Variety piligera often grows near granite rocks or in winter-wet areas and is found from the Murchison River to Margaret River and along the south coast of Western Australia to near Esperance in the Avon Wheatbelt, Coolgardie, Esperance Plains, Geraldton Sandplains, Jarrah Forest, Mallee, Murchison, Swan Coastal Plain and Warren bioregions. Variety simulans occurs between Wongan Hills and Bruce Rock in the Avon Wheatbelt bioregion of south-western Western Australia.

== Conservation status ==
All four varieties of P. imbricata found in Western Australian are listed as "not threatened" by the Government of Western Australia Department of Biodiversity, Conservation and Attractions,
