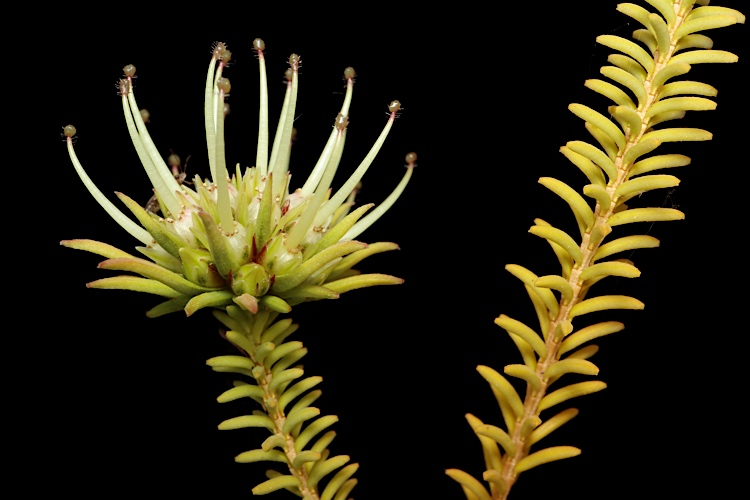
- In the Australian National Botanic Gardens

Conservation status
- Endangered (EPBC Act)

Scientific classification
- Kingdom: Plantae
- Clade: Tracheophytes
- Clade: Angiosperms
- Clade: Eudicots
- Clade: Rosids
- Order: Myrtales
- Family: Myrtaceae
- Genus: Darwinia
- Species: D. ferricola

Binomial name
- Darwinia ferricola Keighery

= Darwinia ferricola =

Scott River darwinia

Species of flowering plant

Darwinia ferricola, commonly known as the Scott River darwinia, is a plant in the myrtle family Myrtaceae and is endemic to a small area in Western Australia. It is a rounded, densely branched shrub with crowded, linear leaves mostly only on younger branches. The flowers are greenish-yellow and red, and arranged in groups on the ends of the branches, with a long white or reddish style protruding from the petal tube.

== Description ==
Scott River darwinia is a densely-branched shrub which grows to a height of 1.5 metres (5 ft) and a width of 1 metre (3 ft). Its youngest branches are greenish brown and the older ones are rough due to part of the leaf bases remained after the leaves drop. The leaves are crowded on the younger branches whilst the older ones are mostly leafless. They are linear in shape, triangular in cross-section, glabrous and mostly 2–5 millimetres (0.08–0.2 in), somewhat longer as they age.

The flowers are arranged in heads of 20 to 40 flowers at the ends of the branches, the heads 20–30 millimetres (0.8–1 in) wide. The heads are surrounded by layers of bracts, the outer ones green or greenish-red and 5–7 millimetres (0.2–0.3 in) long and shorter than the flowers. The petal lobes are about 3 millimetres (0.1 in) long and 1–2 millimetres (0.04–0.08 in) wide, enclosing the stamens, staminodes and the lower part of the style. The style is often reddish and 12–15 millimetres (0.5–0.6 in) long with a ring of hairs near its tip. Flowering occurs from mainly in spring but also from late winter to early summer.

== Taxonomy ==
Darwinia ferricola was first formally described in 2009 by Greg Keighery and the description was published in Nuytsia. The specific epithet (ferricola) is derived from the Latin words ferrum meaning "iron" and -cola meaning "dweller", referring to the habitat preference of this species.

== Distribution and habitat ==
This darwinia is only known from the Scott Coastal Plain, east of Augusta where it grows in scrubland in sand or clay over ironstone.

== Ecology ==
Scott River darwinia is killed by fire but regenerates from seed. It is pollinated by birds.

== Conservation ==
Darwinia ferricola is classified as "Threatened Flora (Declared Rare Flora — Extant)" by the Western Australian Government Department of Parks and Wildlife and a Recovery Plan has been prepared. It has also been listed as "Endangered" (EN) under the Australian Government Environment Protection and Biodiversity Conservation Act 1999 (EPBC Act). There are many threats to the species, including mineral exploration, grazing and trampling, and dieback disease. Translocation of Scott River Darwinia and three other limestone species to old mine sites at Beenup has been successful, even where the soil conditions were apparently poor. It is able to propagate vegetatively when wind-blown sand partly covers the plant.
