= Blackwood Plateau =

Blackwood Plateau is a part of the Blackwood River landscape between the Whicher Scarp and the Scott Coastal Plain in Southwest Australia.

It is also known as the Donnybrook sunkland.
