= Acacia preissiana =

Scientific classification
- Kingdom: Plantae
- Clade: Tracheophytes
- Clade: Angiosperms
- Clade: Eudicots
- Clade: Rosids
- Order: Fabales
- Family: Fabaceae
- Subfamily: Caesalpinioideae
- Clade: Mimosoid clade
- Genus: Acacia
- Species: A. preissiana

Binomial name
- Acacia preissiana (Meisn.) Maslin
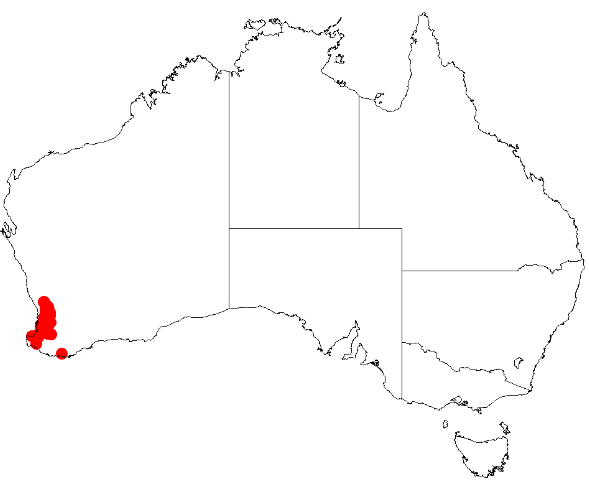
- Occurrence data from AVH

Species of legume

Acacia preissiana is a shrub of the genus Acacia and the subgenus Pulchellae that is endemic to an area of south western Australia.

== Description ==
The low spreading multi-stemmed shrub typically grows to a height of 0.05 to 0.35 metres (0.2 to 1.1 ft) with a Prostrate to semi-prostrate habit with a lignotuber and hairy branchlets that have oblong to widely ovate stipules. The leaves are composed of two or three pairs of pinnae where the proximal pinnae have a length of 3 to 7 mm (0.12 to 0.28 in) and the distal pinnae have a length of 7 to 20 mm (0.28 to 0.79 in). The proximal pinne and composed of two to three pairs of pinnules while the distal pinnae are composed of three to seven pairs of pinnules that are 4 to 6 mm (0.16 to 0.24 in) in length and about 1 mm (0.039 in) wide. It blooms from November to January and produces yellow flowers.

== Etymology ==
A. preissiana was first described as Acacia obscura var. preissiana by Carl Meissner in 1842, but in 1975 Bruce Maslin elevated it to species rank, naming it Acacia preissiana.

== Distribution ==
It is native to an area in the South West, Peel and Great Southern regions of Western Australia where it is commonly found growing in lateritic based soils. The range of the plant extends from north of Binddon in the north down to the Whicher Range in the south. A single collection of the species has been made from around Albany where it is usually a part of Eucalyptus marginata or Eucalyptus wandoo forest communities.

== See also ==
- List of Acacia species
