= Cape Naturaliste College =

Public co-educational day high school in Vasse, Western Australia

Location
- Vasse, South West region, Western Australia; Australia; 33°40′37″S 115°14′40″E

Information
- Type: Public co-educational high day school
- Established: 2008; 18 years ago
- Educational authority: WA Department of Education
- Principal: Dale Miller
- Years: 7–12
- Enrolment: 1168 (2025)
- Campus: Vasse
- Website: cnc.wa.edu.au

Cape Naturaliste College is a comprehensive public co-educational high day school, located in Vasse, a regional centre in the South West region, 240 kilometres (149 mi) south of Perth, Western Australia.

== Overview ==
The school was established in 2008 and admitted 95 foundation Year 8 students in February of that year. The Minister of Education, Mark McGowan, announced later the same year that the school would become a senior high school and enrol students for Year 11 courses in 2011 and Year 12 in 2012.

The college is built on an 8-hectare (20-acre) site and is surrounded by natural bushland. It is of an award-winning design and was constructed at an initial cost of $21 million. However, in 2019–20 over $32 million was spent to upgrade the Science, English, and arts departments (among others).

The school has a multi-media centre, a performing arts centre, visual arts studios, information technology resources, a music program and a cafe.

== See also ==
- List of schools in rural Western Australia
