= Petrophile latericola =

Conservation status
- Declared rare (DEC)

Scientific classification
- Kingdom: Plantae
- Clade: Tracheophytes
- Clade: Angiosperms
- Clade: Eudicots
- Order: Proteales
- Family: Proteaceae
- Genus: Petrophile
- Species: P. latericola

Binomial name
- Petrophile latericola Keighery

Species of shrub endemic to Western Australia

Petrophile latericola is a species of flowering plant in the family Proteaceae and is endemic to southwestern Western Australia. It is an erect shrub with needle-shaped leaves and spherical heads of bright yellow flowers.

== Description ==
Petrophile latericola is an erect shrub that typically grows to a height of 0.3–1.5 m (1 ft 0 in – 4 ft 11 in) high and has glabrous branchlets and leaves. The leaves are needle-shaped, 30–40 mm (1.2–1.6 in) long and sharply pointed. The flowers are arranged on the ends of branchlets in sessile, more or less spherical heads with fifteen to thirty-five flowers. The flowers are 16–20 mm (0.63–0.79 in) long and bright yellow with many tapering linear involucral bracts at the base. Flowering has been observed in November and the fruit is a nut, fused with others in a spherical head about 10 mm (0.39 in) long.

== Taxonomy ==
Petrophile latericola was first formally described in 2010 by Gregory John Keighery in The Western Australian Naturalist from specimens he collected in the Whicher escarpment in 1990. The specific epithet (latericola) means "associated with laterite".

== Distribution and habitat ==
This petrophile grows in heath and shrubland along the base of the Whicher Range in the Swan Coastal Plain biogeographic region in the southwest of Western Australia.

== Conservation status ==
This petrophile is classified as "Threatened Flora (Declared Rare Flora — Extant)" by the Department of Environment and Conservation (Western Australia).

== Cultural references ==
In 2019 Australia Post featured Petrophile latericola on a postage stamp.
