= Abba River =

River in Western Australia

Coordinates: 33°39′6″S 115°27′40″E

- Mouth

Location
- Country: Australia

Physical characteristics
- Source
  - location: Whicher Range
  - elevation: 156 metres (512 ft)
- Mouth
  - location: Vasse-Wonnerup Estuary
  - elevation: sea level
- Length: 24 kilometres (15 mi)
- Basin size: 261 square kilometres (101 sq mi)

The Abba River is a river in the South West region of Western Australia.

The headwaters of the river rise in the Whicher Range in the Millbrook State Forest then flow in a northerly direction. The river crosses the Vasse Highway and then passes through Wonnerup Siding before discharging into the Vasse Estuary east of Busselton and finally the Indian Ocean.

The river was named in 1834 by Frederick Ludlow. The name is Aboriginal in origin and is a greeting word used by the local peoples.

Construction of a bridge over the Abba and the Sabina River commenced in 1860, despite dreadful weather and the rivers running high at the time.
