= Thomas Vasse =

French sailor (1774–1801)

Thomas Timothée Vasse
- Born: 27 February 1774; Dieppe, Seine-Maritime, France
- Died: 8 June 1801 (aged 27); Geographe Bay, New Holland (Australia), Australia
- Known for: Drowning in Australia during the voyage of the Naturaliste

Thomas Timothée Vasse (27 February 1774 in Dieppe, Seine-Maritime – presumed 8 June 1801) was a French sailor who was lost in the surf in the South West region of Australia in 1801, and presumed drowned. From Vasse's name is taken the name the Vasse, an early name for Busselton, for the land adjacent to where the incident occurred, the town of Vasse, and also a number of geographical features in the area including Vasse River and Vasse Inlet.

Born in Dieppe and baptised Timothée Thomas Joseph Ambroise Vasse, Vasse was a helmsman second class on Naturaliste during the 1801–04 expedition of Géographe and Naturaliste under Nicolas Baudin, which explored much of the southwest coast of New Holland (now Western Australia). On 30 May 1801, the expedition anchored in a bay that they named Géographe Bay, and a party went ashore. On the evening of 8 June, during the onset of a wild storm, an attempt was made to return the landed party to the ships. One of the ships' boats was anchored beyond the surf, and ropes were used to haul people from the shore to the boat. Vasse, who was said to be a strong swimmer but was also said in some reports to have been drunk, was lost in the heavy surf and presumed drowned.

A number of stories subsequently emerged that claimed that Vasse had survived. Some time between 1804 and 1807, a rumour that Vasse had survived appeared in some Paris newspapers. Vasse was reported to have been washed ashore, walked 500 kilometres (300 mi) south, and been picked up by an American whaler which took him as far as the English Channel. He was then said to have been arrested by an English ship, and incarcerated in an English jail. According to François Péron, enquiries into the story concluded that it was a fabrication.

In 1838, George Fletcher Moore questioned some of the local Wardandi people and was told that Vasse had not drowned. Moore wrote in his diary:

Some natives of that neighbourhood recollect him. They treated him kindly and fed him but he lingered on the seacoast looking for his vessel. He gradually became very thin from anxiety, exposure and poor diet. At last the natives were absent for a time on a hunting expedition and on their return they found him dead on the beach, his body much swollen [...].

Moore initially published this story in a letter to The Perth Gazette.

In 1841, Georgiana Molloy related a different story of Vasse's survival in a letter to Captain James Mangles, but gave no provenance for her version of events. She wrote:

Dr Carr... has undertaken to reclaim the Bones of Mons. Vasse, the Gentm. from who this river takes its Name. Some society in Paris has offered a reward or present for them. These natives know where they are, in the vicinity of Cape Naturaliste, and are now employed getting them, or for what I know, have got them. This event happened about thirty years since; this unfortunate Gentm. came in shore to explore, was seized, strangled and the spear went in at the right side of the heart.

== General references ==
- Cullity, Thomas Brendan (1992). Vasse: An Account of the Disappearance of Thomas Timothée Vasse. Perth.
- Hasluck, Alexandra (1955). Portrait with Background: A Life of Georgiana Molloy. Melbourne: Oxford University Press.
- Moore, George Fletcher (1978). Diary of Ten Years Eventful Life of an Early Settler in Western Australia. Introduction by C. T. Stannage. Nedlands: UWA Publishing. ISBN 0-85564-137-1. LCCN 79670397. OCLC 6015258. OL 4072991M. Wikidata Q136449801.
- Marchant, Leslie R. French Napoleonic Placenames of the South West Coast, Greenwood, WA. R.I.C. Publications, 2004. ISBN 1-74126-094-9
