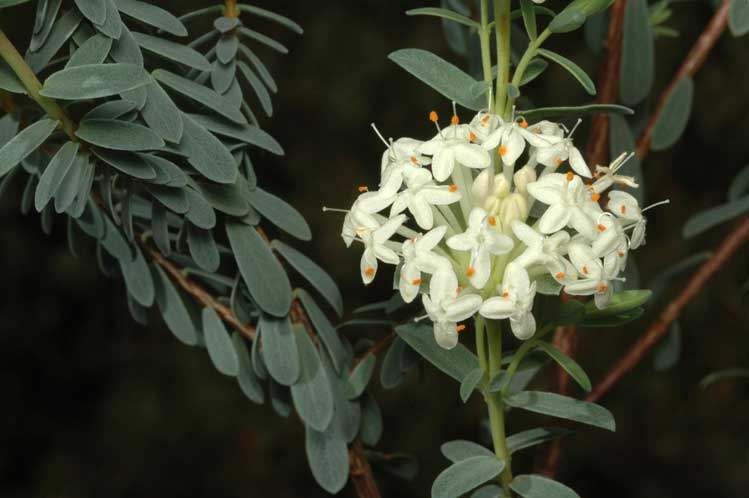
- In the Australian National Botanic Gardens

Scientific classification
- Kingdom: Plantae
- Clade: Tracheophytes
- Clade: Angiosperms
- Clade: Eudicots
- Clade: Rosids
- Order: Malvales
- Family: Thymelaeaceae
- Genus: Pimelea
- Species: P. ciliolaris

Binomial name
- Pimelea ciliolaris (Threlfall) Rye

= Pimelea ciliolaris =

Species of shrub

Pimelea ciliolaris is a species of flowering plant in the family Thymelaeaceae and is endemic to a restricted area of New South Wales. It is a stunted shrub with narrowly elliptic leaves and heads of densely hairy, cream-coloured to pale yellow flowers.

== Description ==
Pimelea ciliolaris is a stunted shrub that typically grows to a height of up to 30 cm (12 in) and has hairy stems. Its leaves are narrowly elliptic or linear, 5–15 mm (0.20–0.59 in) long and 1–3 mm (0.039–0.118 in) wide with a few hairs on the edge when young. The flowers are borne in compact heads on a peduncle 1–9 mm (0.039–0.354 in) long, surrounded by 9 to 15 involucral bracts 7–15 mm (0.28–0.59 in) long and 1.5–4 mm (0.059–0.157 in) wide tinged with purple. The sepals are about 2.5 mm (0.098 in) long, the floral tube about 10 mm (0.39 in) long and the stamens usually shorter than the sepals. Flowering occurs from October to December.

== Taxonomy ==
This pimelea was first formally described in 1983 by S. Threlfall who gave it the name Pimelea octophylla subsp. ciliolaris in the journal Brunonia from specimens collected in the Warrumbungle Ranges in 1899. In 1990, Barbara Lynette Rye raised the subspecies to species status as Pimelea ciliolaris in the Flora of Australia.

== Distribution and habitat ==
Pimelea ciliolaris grows in exposed, rocky places in the Warrumbungles in northern New South Wales.
