= Vasse-Wonnerup Estuary =

Estuary near Busselton, Western Australia

Coordinates: 33°38′S 115°24′E

Designations

Ramsar Wetland
- Official name: Vasse-Wonnerup System
- Designated: 7 June 1990
- Reference no.: 484

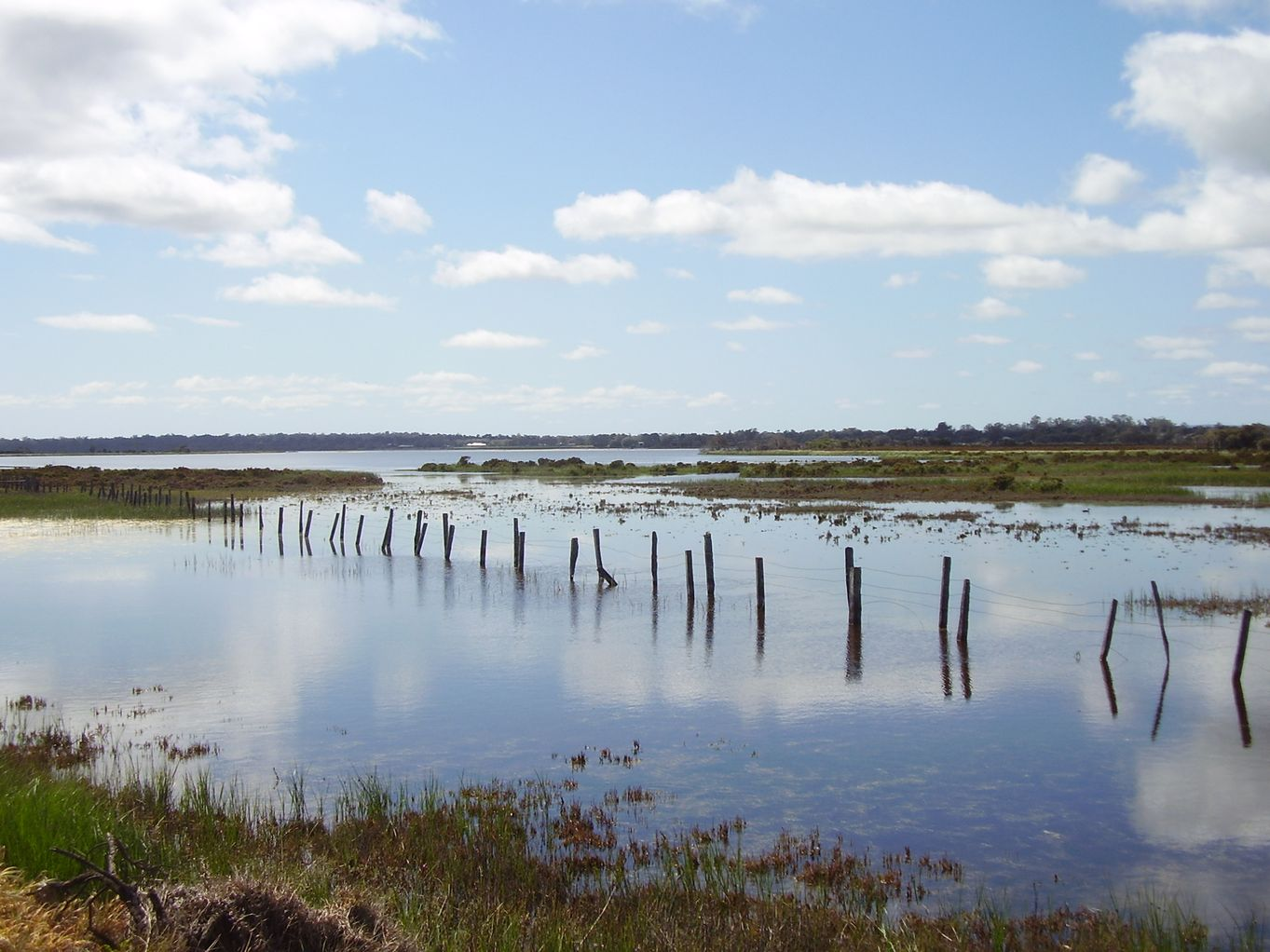
Vasse-Wonnerup Estuary Wetlands near Busselton

The Vasse-Wonnerup Estuary is an estuary in the South West region of Western Australia close to the town of Busselton. The estuary is listed with DIWA. It was also recognised as a wetland of international importance under the Ramsar Convention on 7 June 1990 when an area of 1,115 ha (2,760 acres) was designated Ramsar Site 484 as an important dry-season habitat for waterbirds. It is also the main part of the 2,038 ha (5,040-acre) Busselton Wetlands Important Bird Area.

== Description ==
The estuary is wave dominated and has been severely modified from its natural state. The site of the Vasse and Wonnerup Floodgates that regulated the flow of water in the estuary from about 1907 inadvertently created the freshwater wetland, were listed on the Western Australian Register of Heritage Places in 2005. The estuary covers a total surface area of 17.8 square kilometres (7 sq mi) with the central basin having an area of 7.5 square kilometres (3 sq mi) In winter, wide areas of open water are fringed by samphire and rushes. Paperbark woodland occurs behind the samphire belt, with eucalypt woodland on higher ground.

== Catchment ==
The catchment of the estuary is 52% cleared and is used primarily for crops and pastures but also for plantations. The waters are susceptible to pollution from run-off as houses in Busselton have been built adjacent to the estuary. The Abba River, Ludlow River, Sabina River and Vasse River all discharge into the estuary.

The catchment covers a total area of 961 square kilometres (371 sq mi) and is part of the Geographe Bay catchment. The coastal plain area is composed of sandy and duplex soils that are easily water-logged. An extensive drainage network has been constructed to protect Busselton and Wonnerup from flooding and to create agricultural land.

== Birds ==
It is estimated that over 20,000 waterbirds use the estuary as habitat with over 80 species of waterbird being found. Some of the species found in the area include black-winged stilt, banded stilt, Australasian shoveller, Australian shelduck and the red-necked avocet. The largest breeding colony of black swans in Western Australia (over 150 pairs) is in the estuary.

== Fish kills ==
Fish kills have occurred in the estuary in 2009, 2011 and 2013. In the 2013 event an estimated 7,000 fish died over the course of two days, calling into question the health of the waterway. It is thought that low flows, poor water quality and high phosphorus levels were to blame. Rainfall washed nutrients downstream to the estuary then a warm spell sparked the growth of algae depleting the water of oxygen, killing the fish.
