= Scott National Park =

National park in Western Australia

- IUCN category II (national park)
- Location within Western Australia
- Location: Western Australia
- Nearest city: Augusta
- Coordinates: 34°15′29″S 115°14′08″E
- Area: 32.73 km^{2} (12.64 sq mi)
- Established: 1959
- Governing body: Department of Environment and Conservation

Scott National Park is a national park in the South West region of Western Australia, 265 km (165 mi) south of Perth.

It is based on the catchment area of the Scott River and the eastern bank of the Blackwood River, and occurs in part on the Scott Coastal Plain. It has a population of honey possum in the park.

It has had reviews of its flora and fauna due to the proximity of mining exploration and activity.

== See also ==
- Protected areas of Western Australia
