= Scott Coastal Plain =

Scott Coastal Plain is a plain that lies between the Blackwood Plateau and the south coast of Western Australia, east of Augusta and Cape Leeuwin. The name of the plain is derived from the river that drains the western portion of the plain, the Scott River.
