= Vasse River =

River in Western Australia

Coordinates: 33°43′1″S 115°21′34″E

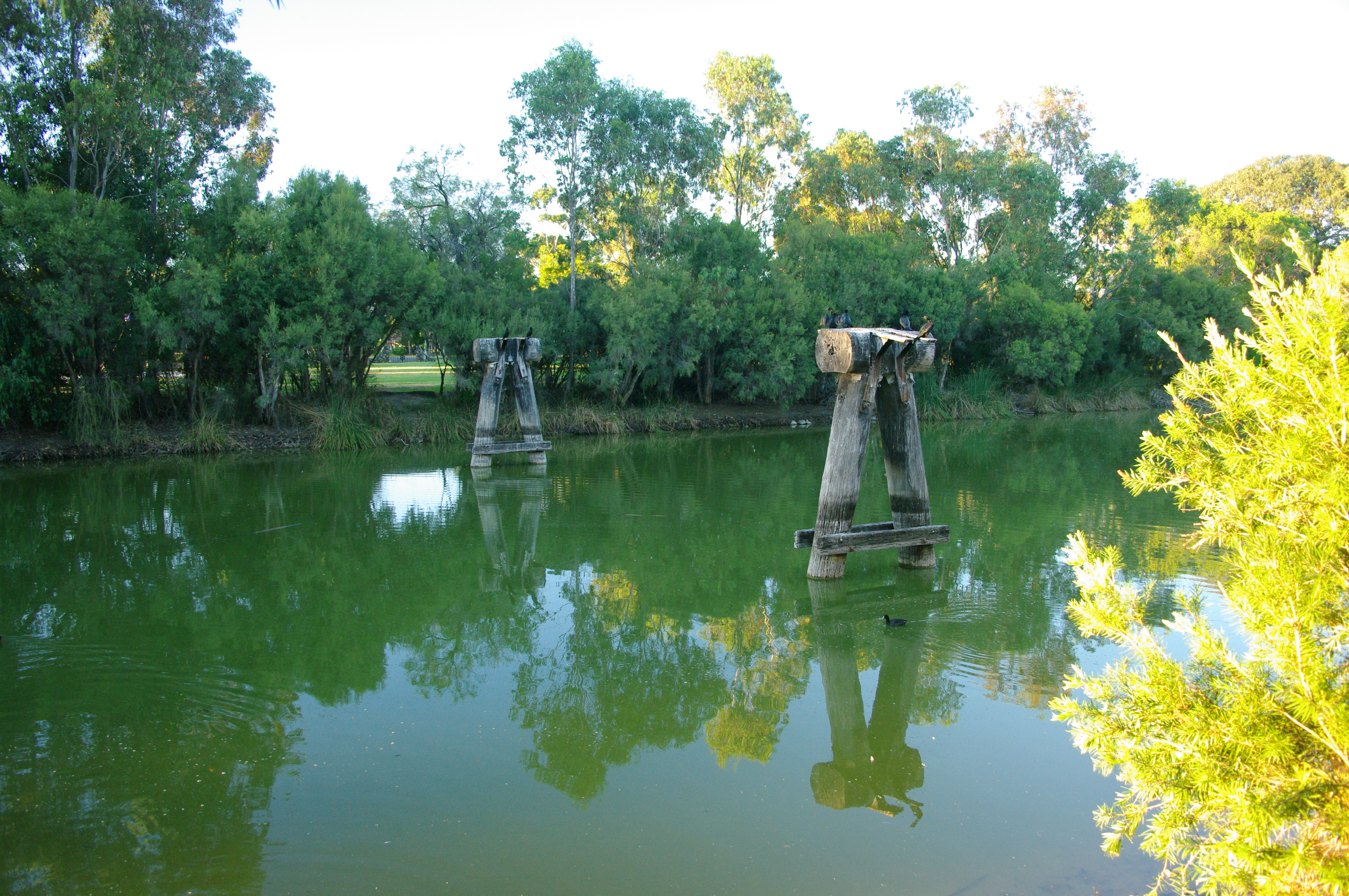

Location
- Country: Australia

Physical characteristics
- Source
  - location: Whicher Range
  - elevation: 79 metres (259 ft)
- Mouth
  - location: Vasse Estuary
  - elevation: sea level
- Length: 32 km (20 mi)
- Basin size: 283 km^{2} (109 sq mi)

The Vasse River is a river in the South West region of Western Australia.

The headwaters of the river are in the Whicher Range below Chapman Hill and it flows in a northerly direction through the city of Busselton until discharging into the Vasse Estuary and then the Indian Ocean via Wonnerup Inlet and Geographe Bay.

The river is named after French seaman Thomas (Timothée) Vasse, who disappeared in the area in June 1801 during Nicolas Baudin's expedition.

It is estimated that 81.5% of the Vasse River catchment has been cleared.

== See also ==
- Vasse and Wonnerup Floodgates
