= Margaret River (South West, Western Australia) =

River in Western Australia

Coordinates: 33°56′43.28″S 115°4′26.79″E

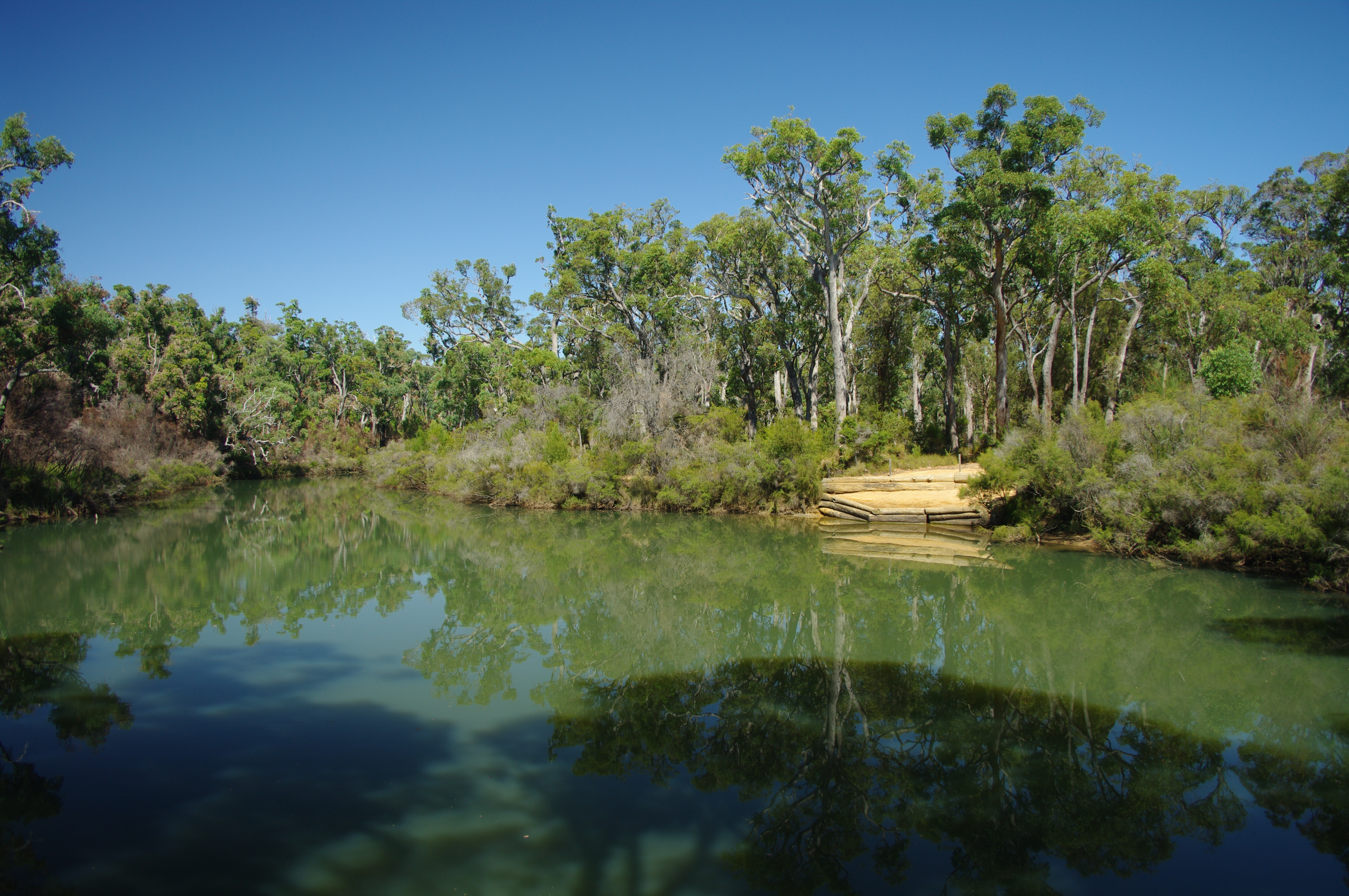
- Cane brake pool at the head of the river

Location
- Country: Australia

Physical characteristics
- Mouth
  - location: Indian Ocean
- Length: 60 kilometres (37 mi)
- Basin size: 40 square kilometres (15 mi^{2})

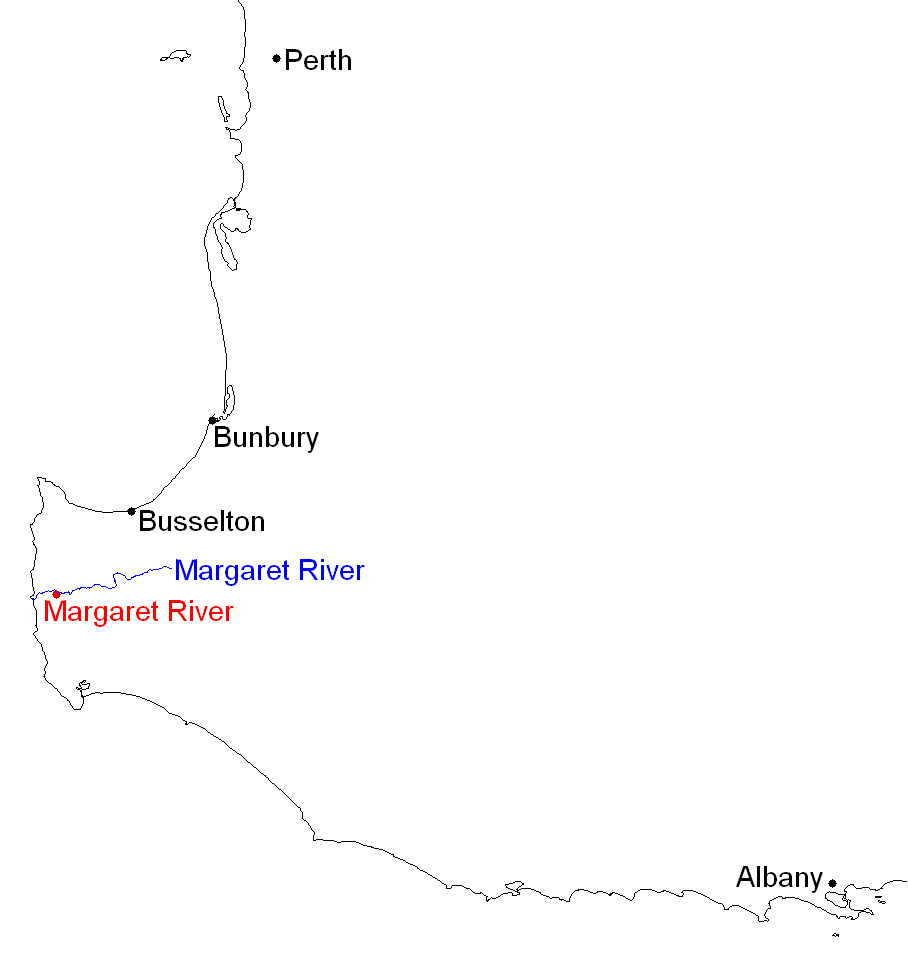
Location of Margaret River

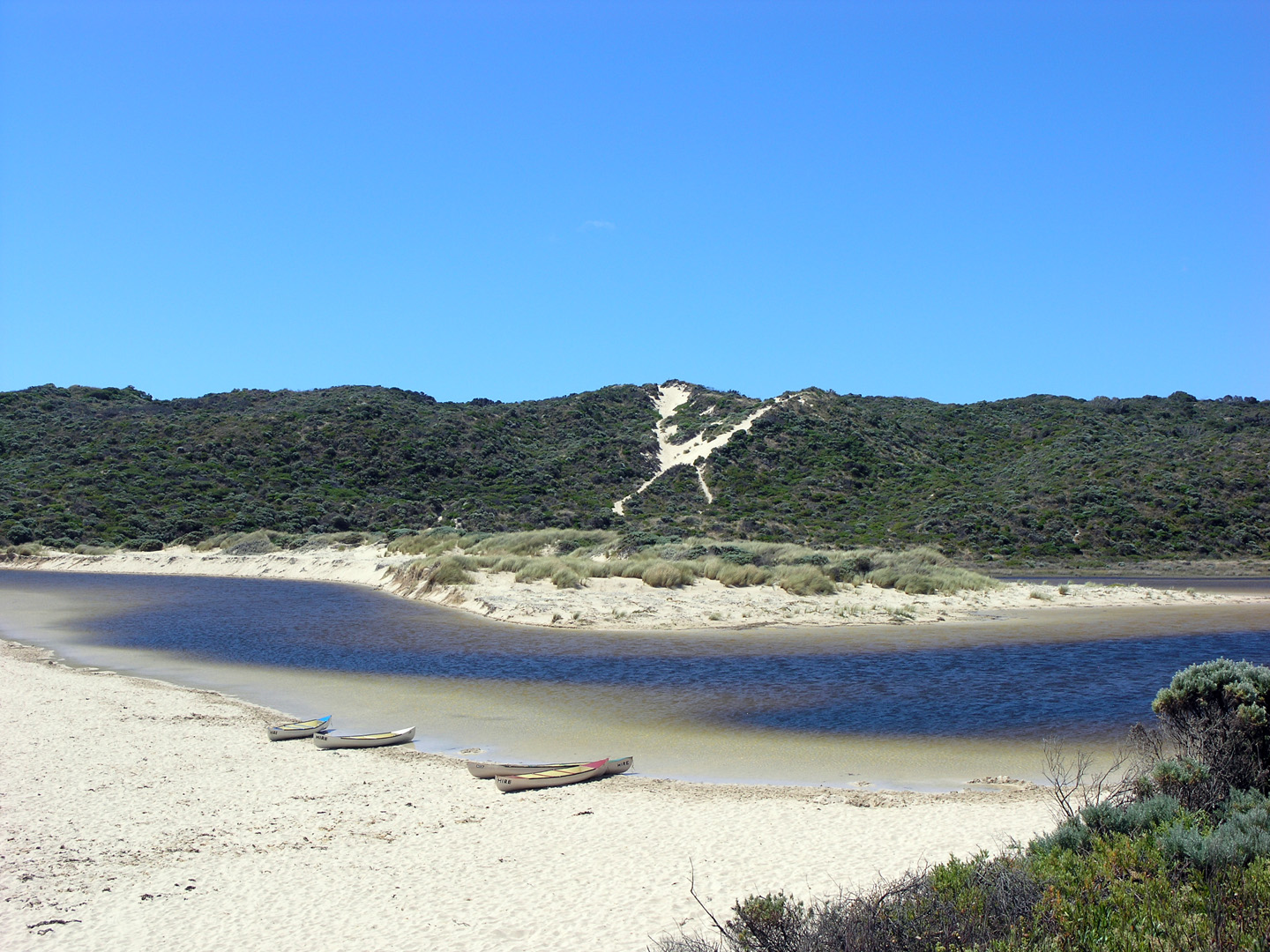
The estuary

The Margaret River is a river in the South West region of Western Australia. It is the namesake of the town of Margaret River and the surrounding wine region.

The Margaret River has been described as the only "true river system" between Cape Naturaliste and Cape Leeuwin. The river arises from a catchment of just 40 square kilometres (15 sq mi) in the Whicher Range. The flow of the river has been restricted for agricultural and viticultural purposes, and modified by several weirs; it passes to the north of the Margaret River townsite. The mouth of the river is located to the north of the townsite of Prevelly, with a small estuary extending approximately 2 kilometres (1.2 mi) long and 200 metres (660 ft) at its widest. It is connected to the Indian Ocean via a short narrow channel, usually obstructed by a sandbar which opens only during the periods of highest flow.

Margaret River is presumed to be named after Margaret Wyche, cousin of John Garrett Bussell (founder of Busselton) in 1832.

== See also ==
- Margaret River (wine region)

== Sources ==
- Brearley, Anne (2005). Ernest Hodgkin's Swanland: Estuaries and coastal lagoons of Southwestern Australia. University of Western Australia Press. ISBN 1-920694-38-2.
