= Scott River (Western Australia) =

River in Western Australia

Coordinates: 34.2728°S 115.2108°E

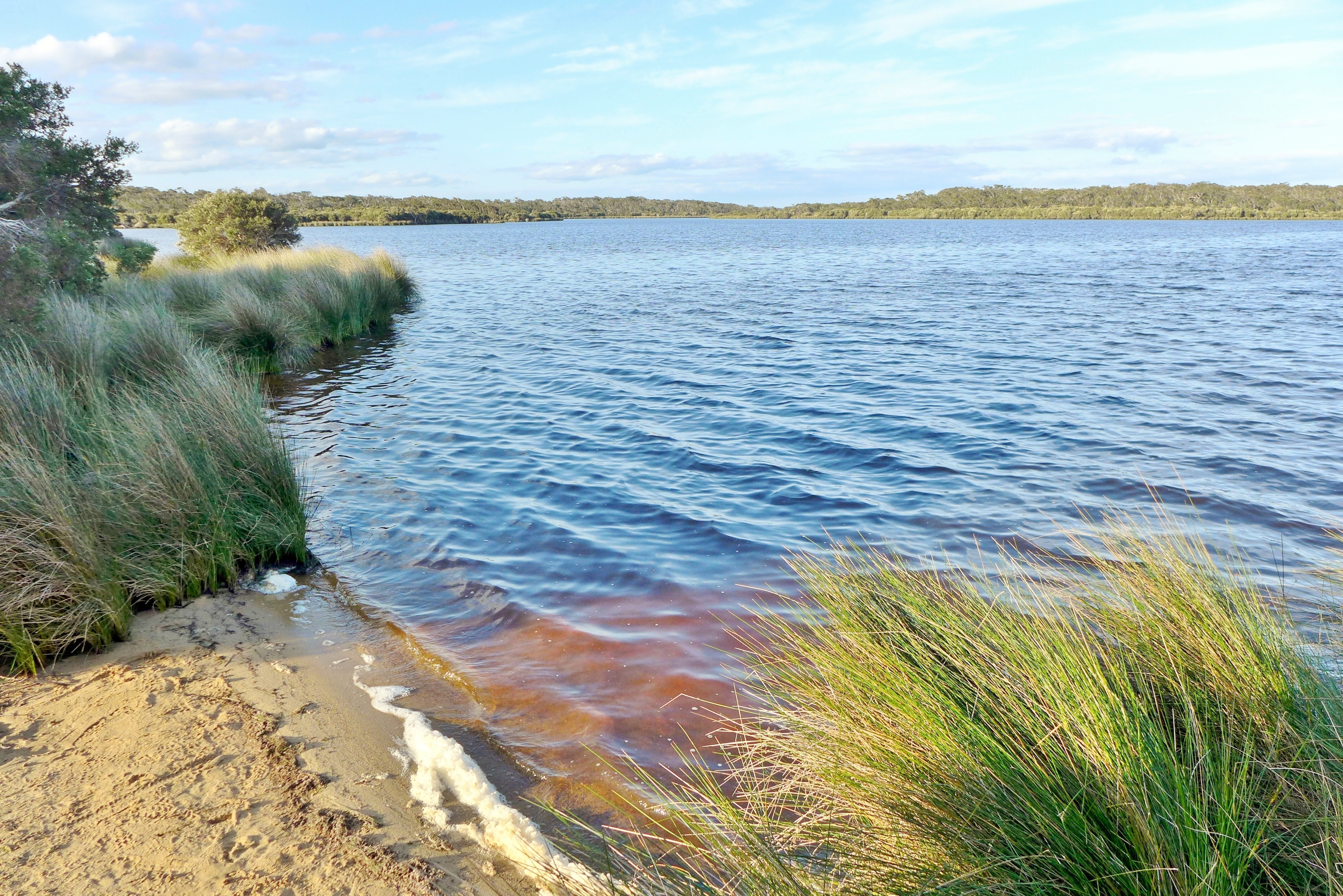

Location
- Country: Australia

Scott River is a river in the south west of Western Australia, a tributary to the Blackwood River where it joins just east of Molloy Island. It is partly located within Scott National Park.

The coastal plain that the river lies on goes east to Walpole and is known as the Scott Coastal Plain.

It is north east of Augusta and south of the Brockman Highway. Scott River Road is the main access road into the catchment area, which leaves the highway near Alexander Bridge.

The river catchment area has evidence of early Aboriginal usage of the area.

It is the habitat of Boronia exilis, otherwise known as Scott River boronia, as well as other threatened plant communities.

The catchment area was known to have iron ore reserves, and the area had a short lived sand mine operation - BHP Billiton Beenup.

The hydrogeology and water condition of the area is sensitive to pollutants and human activity, and mining and other activities have usually not passed the requirements to not damage the catchment area.
