= Whicher Range =

Landform in south west of Western Australia

Coordinates: 33°48′S 115°22′E

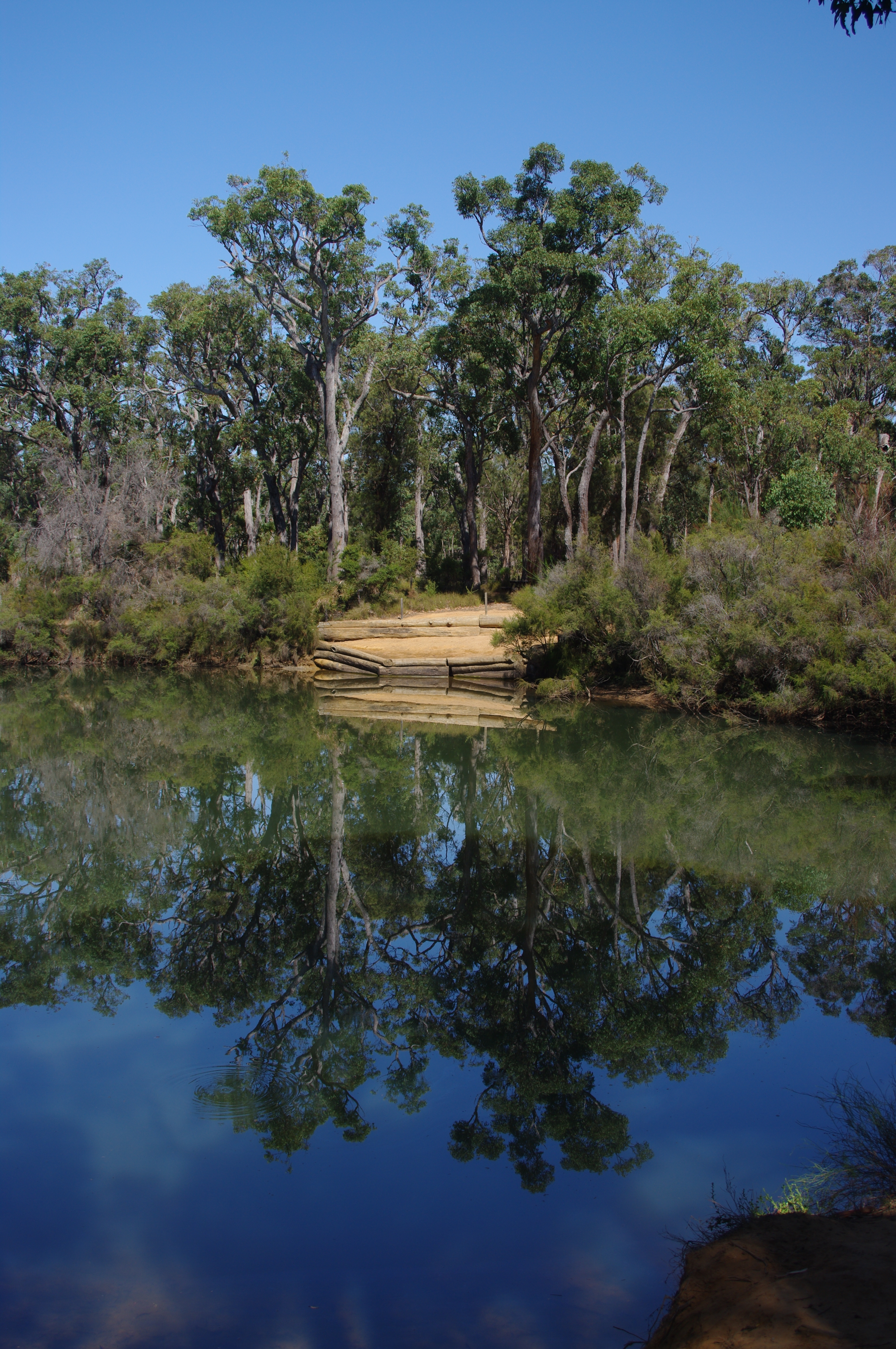
Cane brake pool at the head of the Margaret river in the Whicher range

Whicher Range, also known as Whicher Scarp, is a range in the South West region of Western Australia.

The range has an average elevation of 170 metres (558 ft) above sea level.

Bounded by the Swan Coastal Plain to the west and the south, the Darling Scarp to the north and the Blackwood Plateau to the east, the range is approximately 20 kilometres (12 mi) south of Busselton. The range has the form of a crescent shaped scarp.

Composed of lateritic Mesozoic sediments, the range marks the southern and western edge of the Yilgarn Block.

== Ecological fragility ==
The range is also the location of endemic rare flora and this had been identified in the 1970s. It has also been surveyed more recently in 2008, showing that further interest in the range's floristic uniqueness deserved more study.

The most critically endangered species that inhabits the Whicher range is Petrophile latericola also known as Laterite petrophile, Ironstone Petrophile or the Ironstone Pixie Mop, which has a range of approximately 4.1 square kilometres (2 sq mi) within the range. Another threatened species that inhabits the range is Grevillea elongata or the Ironstone grevillea which is found mostly in one single community known as Southern Ironstone; this species is under continuous threat from weeds such as Watsonia.

A National Park, Whicher National Park, has been created on the range.

== Issues ==
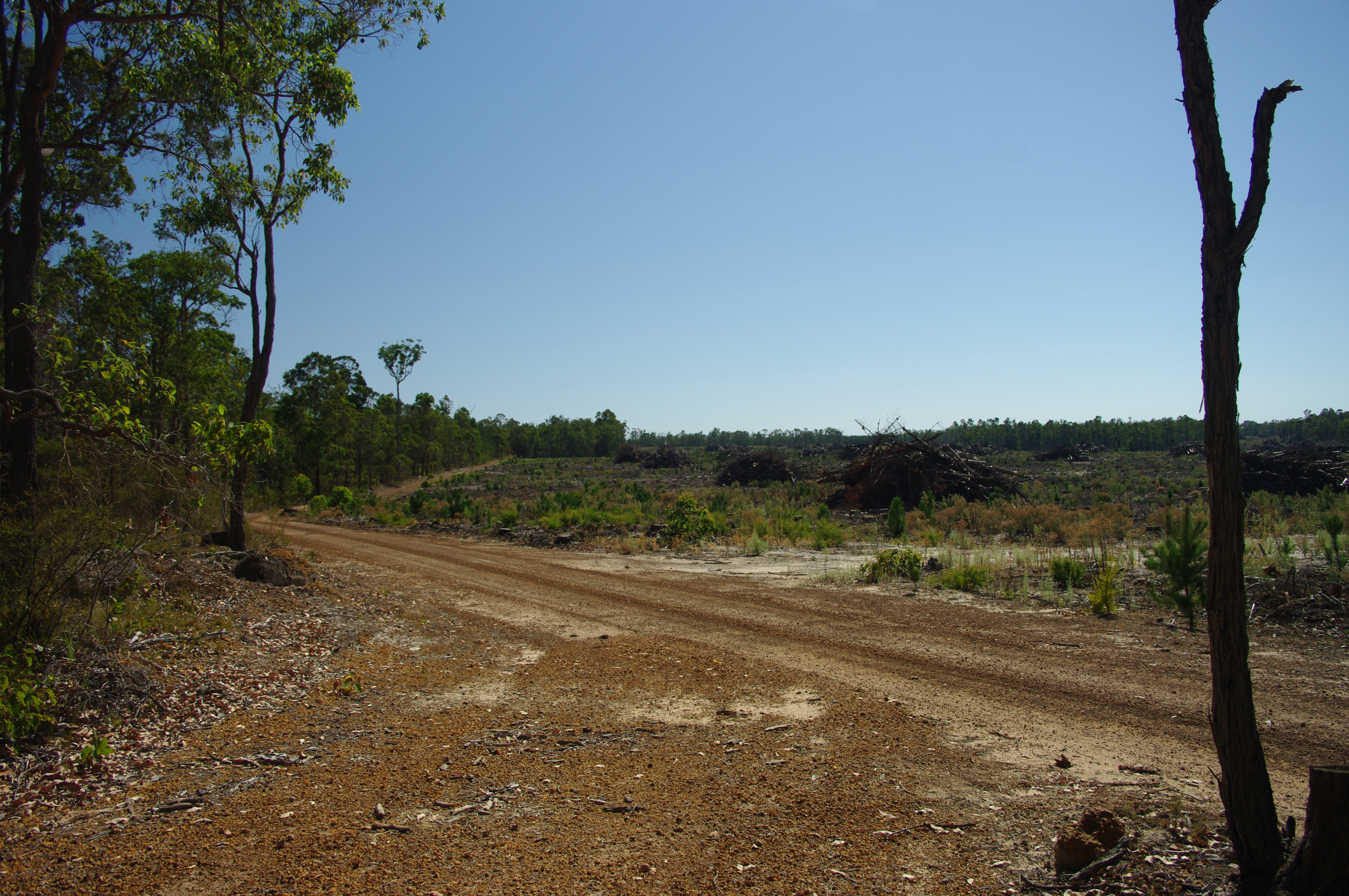
Pine plantation after being logged in the Whicher Range

Despite its unique environmental features of rare flora and residual native vegetation the range is under pressure as a water and gas supply location. The Abba River and the Vasse River both rise in the range and then flow north before finally discharging into the Vasse-Wonnerup Estuary near Busselton. The Margaret River and its tributary Margaret River North also rise from the Whicher Range and then flow west before discharging into the Indian Ocean.

Large gas reserves are known to exist under the range. Discovered over 30 years ago, the field is estimated to be over 4 trillion cubic feet in size. However, working out means of extracting the gas proved difficult for an earlier company Amity Oil in 2004.

In 2011, the player for the gas resource included Westralian Gas and Power, which endorses hydraulic fracturing or "fracking" to release the gas. The Western Australian Minister for Mines and Petroleum, Norman Moore has also made public comments regarding legislation in relation to fracking. Also at the same time Whicher Range Energy is in the process of drilling on the location.

The range and the rivers that originate in its area were under review for potential dam sites and water allocation.
