= Tuart forest =

Forest in Western Australia

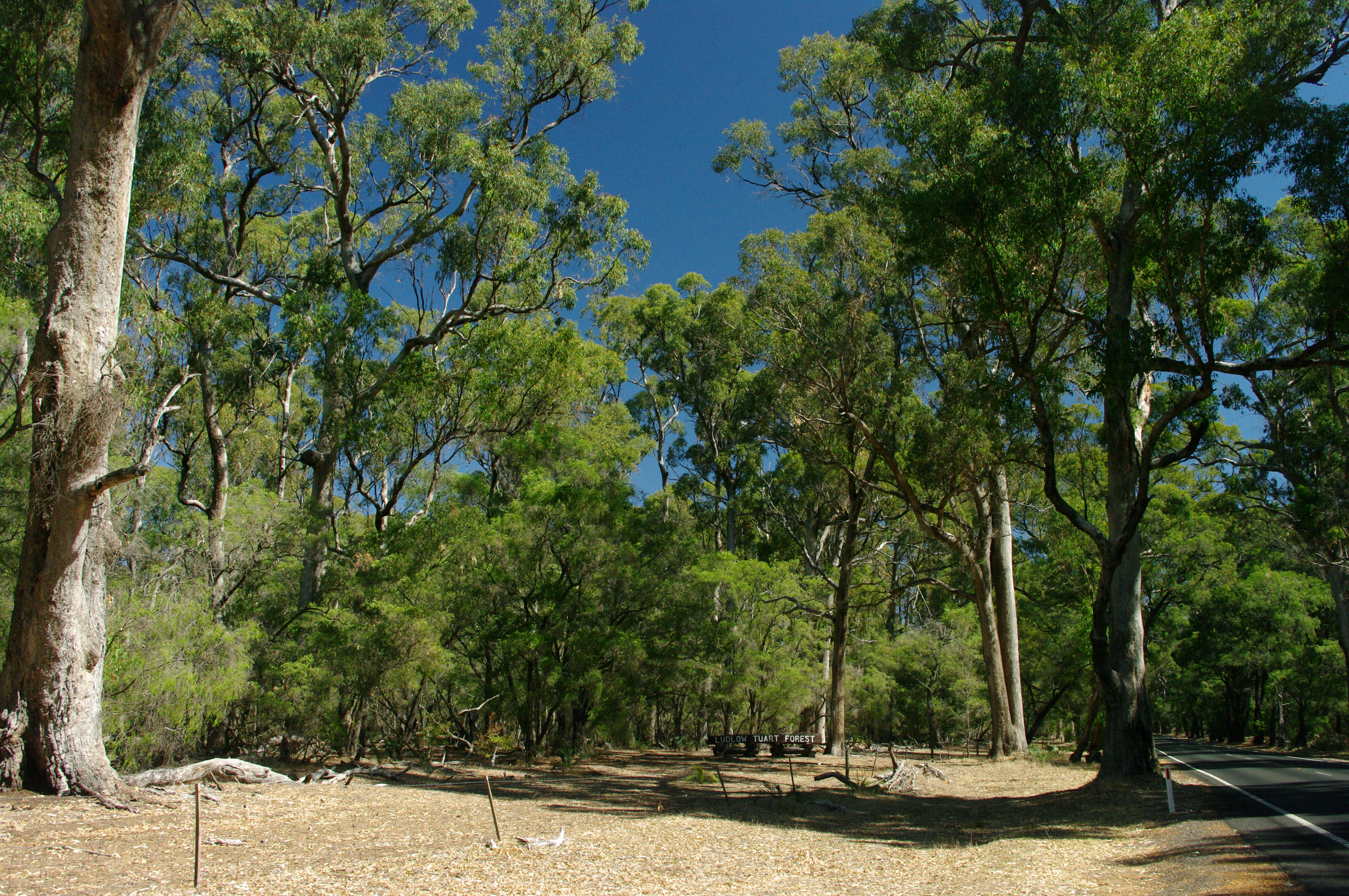
Ludlow Tuart Forest

Tuart forest is an open forest in which the dominant overstorey tree is Eucalyptus gomphocephala (tuart). This form of vegetation occurs only in the Southwest Botanical Province of Western Australia. Tuart being predominantly a coastal tree, tuart forest occurs only in a narrow belt along the coast.

== Logging history and conservation ==
Coastal land in the southwest of Western Australia has been in high demand ever since British settlement of the Swan River Colony, initially for grazing, and more recently for housing. Tuart was also a prized timber. It is light in colour, similar to honey oak, and unusually hard. It was particularly useful where a very hard wood was needed, and most old-style butchers had a tuart "round" as a durable chopping block. As a result of its value as a timber and as grazing land, most of the tuart forest has now been cleared. The only remaining tall tuart forest is the Ludlow Tuart Forest now protected by the Tuart Forest National Park. Other tuart forest occurs in the Maiden Tuart Forest near Bunbury, and further north near Mandurah, although these are smaller trees. The forests and other surviving remnants are now the target of active conservation efforts such as the National Trust of Australia's Tuart Forest Appeal.

The world's only tall tuarts grow in an area of less than 2,000 hectares (5,000 acres) around Ludlow near Busselton, 200 kilometres (120 mi) south of Perth, making it one of the rarest forests in the world. Now that it has been preserved from further logging, the next challenge is to revive the ageing forest, which suffers from degradation due to almost two centuries of cattle grazing, to weed infestation (particularly arum lilies), and an absence of new young trees due to overpopulation of western grey kangaroo (Macropus fuliginosus), for whom infant tuart saplings are a favoured dietary item. In addition, many areas of tuart forest have suffered from tree death and decline due to a newly described dieback organism, (Phytophthora multivora), which acts in a similar way to the well-publicised (Phytophthora cinnamomi).

== Fauna ==
Besides the western grey kangaroos, other inhabitants are the western brushtail and the endangered western ringtail possum (Pseudocheirus peregrinus occidentalis), whose principal diet is the leaves of the peppermint (Agonis flexuosa) tree. These animals rest by day in hollows in the tuart trees and move to the peppermints to feed at night. Also inhabiting the forest are the carnivorous wambenger (Phascogale tapoatafa) and the quenda (Isoodon obesulus) or southern brown bandicoot, and the tiny freetail bat (Tadarida australis). Abundant birdlife can be seen in the forest and the nearby Vasse-Wonnerup Estuary. A number of spectacular birds of prey will frequently be seen, such as ospreys (Pandion haliaetus cristatus) and whistling kites (Haliastur sphenurus), but of particular interest is the Australian shelduck (Tadorna tadornoides) which nests high in tuart tree hollows. The female incubates five to fourteen cream-coloured eggs for 30 to 33 days while her mate defends the surrounding territory. The newly hatched young leap from the nest cavity to the ground and are led by their parents on a perilous overland journey to their brooding territory in the nearby estuary. They remain together in a family group for the first six weeks of the ducklings' lives. Once the young birds fledge they are completely independent.
