= Frederick Ludlow =

Settler of Western Australia

Frederick Ludlow (born 1796, date of death unknown) was an early colonial settler in Western Australia. He is credited with the discovery of the Capel River.

Frederick Ludlow was born in 1796. In 1828, he and his wife Mildred ("Kitty") emigrated to Western Australia as servants of Captain Mark John Currie, arriving in Perth on board the Parmelia in June 1829. In April 1830, Ludlow joined a group including the Molloys and the Bussells in forming a new settlement at Augusta. The following year, Ludlow walked from Augusta to Perth in company with John Kellam and John Welburn. Although much undiscovered land would have been traversed, no journal was kept so no discoveries were attributed to the men. In June 1834, Ludlow made the same journey, this time on his own. Ludlow kept a journal of his travels, and was consequently credited with the discovery of much new land. In particular, he is credited with the discovery of the Capel River, although he did not give it a name. Ludlow later took up land near Busselton, much of which is now known as the Ludlow Tuart Forest in the Tuart Forest National Park. Both the Ludlow River and the town of Ludlow are named after him.

== See also ==
- Eucalyptus gomphocephala
