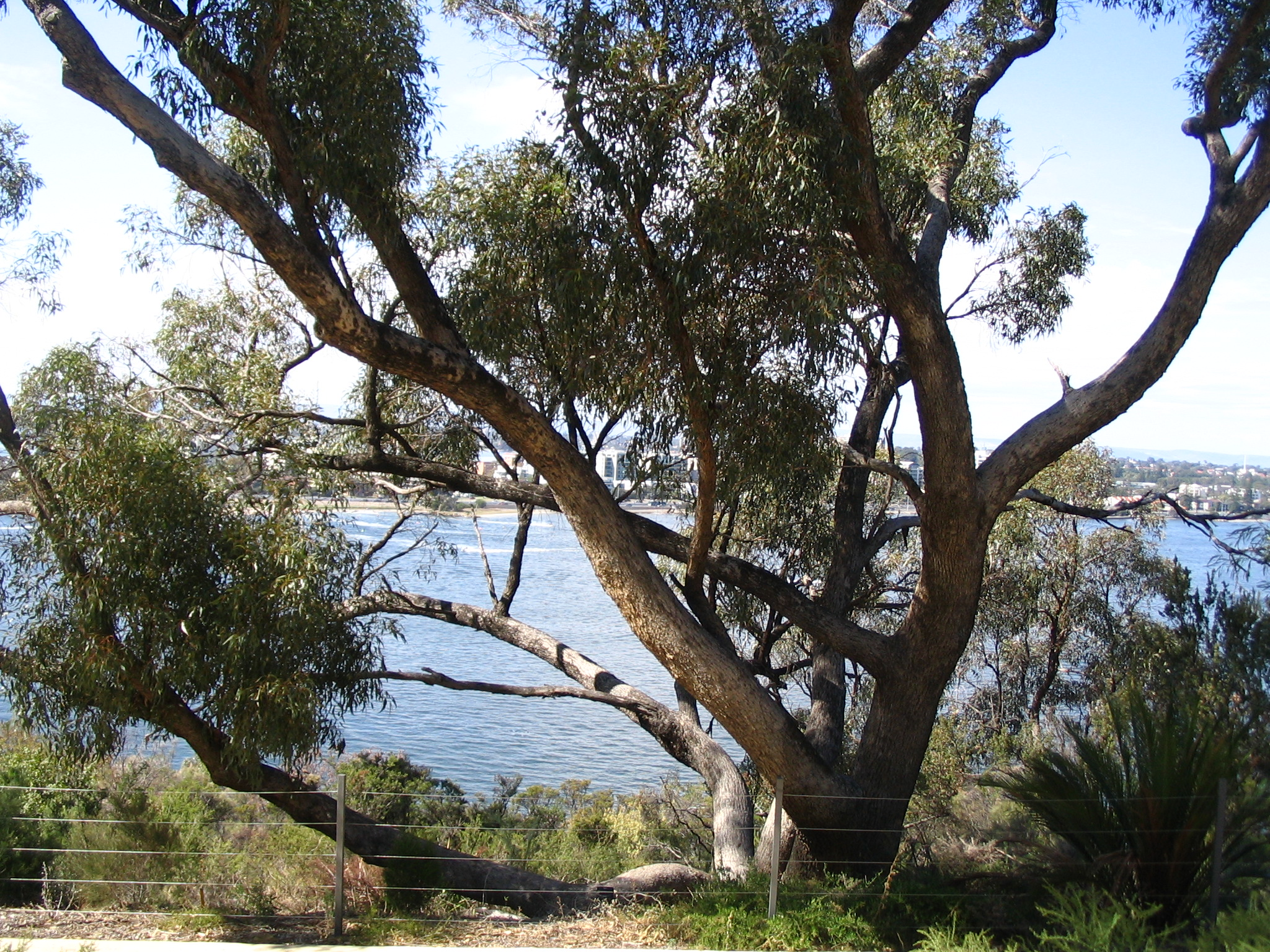
- Eucalyptus gomphocephala in Kings Park, Perth

Conservation status
- Vulnerable (IUCN 3.1)

Scientific classification
- Kingdom: Plantae
- Clade: Tracheophytes
- Clade: Angiosperms
- Clade: Eudicots
- Clade: Rosids
- Order: Myrtales
- Family: Myrtaceae
- Genus: Eucalyptus
- Species: E. gomphocephala

Binomial name
- Eucalyptus gomphocephala DC.
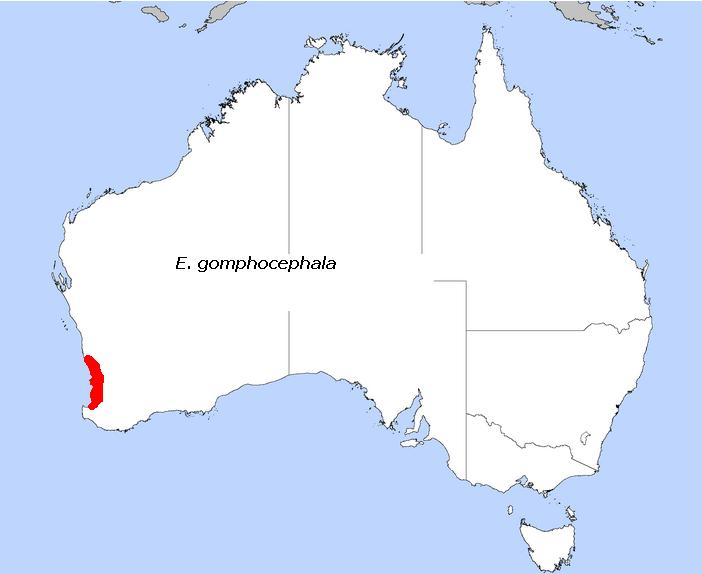
- Field range

Synonyms
- Eucalyptus gomphocephala DC. var. gomphocephala; Eucalyptus gomphocephala var. rhodoxylon Blakely & H.Steedman

= Eucalyptus gomphocephala =

Tuart

Species of eucalyptus

Eucalyptus gomphocephala, known as tuart, is a species of tree and is one of the six forest giants of Southwest Australia.

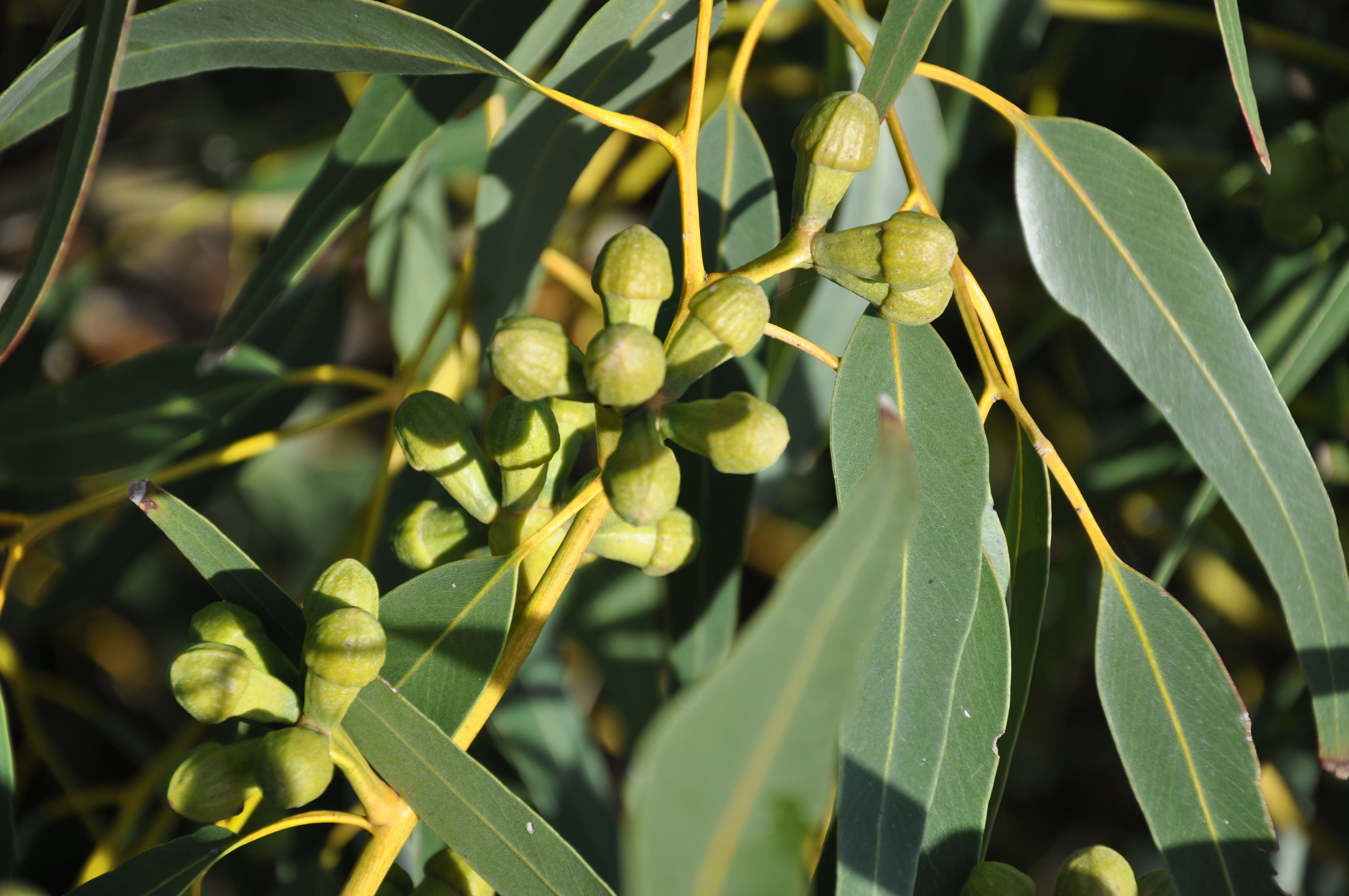
Flower buds

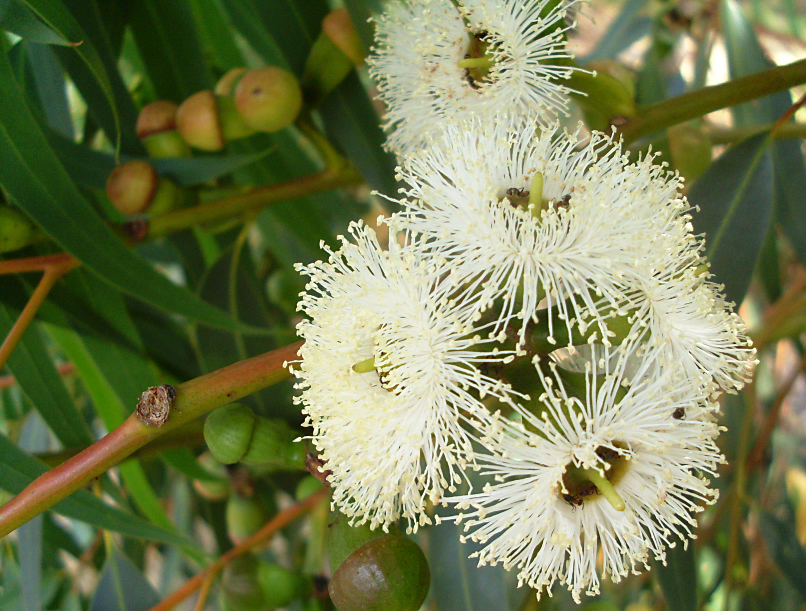
Flowers

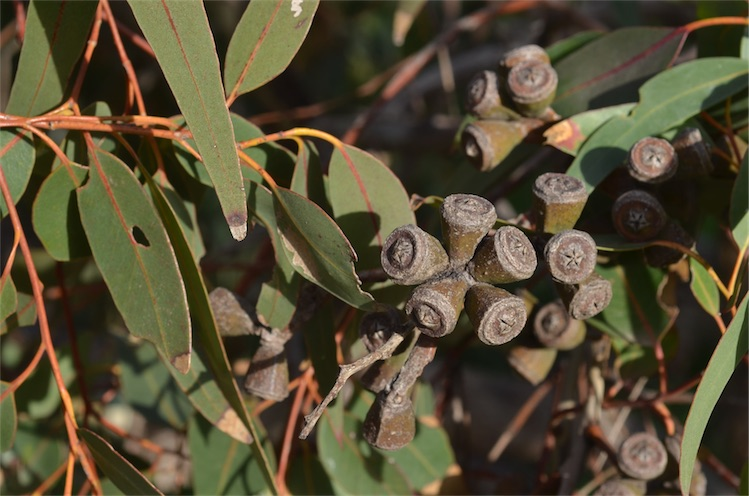
Fruit

The trees usually grow to a height of 10 to 40 m (33 to 131 ft) and mostly have a single stem, but can have multiple stems under some conditions. The crown can be as wide as 25 metres (82 ft). It has rough box-like bark over the length of the trunk and larger branches. The glossy light-green to green adult leaves are arranged alternately and have an oval to lanceolate or falcate shape, and have a leaf blade that is 90 to 180 millimetres (3.5 to 7.1 in) long and 1.5 to 3 cm (0.59 to 1.18 in) wide. The tree flowers between January and April with white to cream inflorescences that form in the leaf axils and are not branched. The fruits that follow have an obconic to upside-down bell shape.

Tuarts were first formally described by the botanist Augustin Pyramus de Candolle in 1828. The botanist Jean-Baptiste Leschenault assembled the type collection at the Vasse River near Geographe Bay during 1802, while serving with the Baudin expedition.

The distribution range of tuart is along a narrow coastal corridor within the Swan Coastal Plain, extending inland 5 to 10 kilometres (3.1 to 6.2 mi), a continuous corridor south from Yanchep to Busselton. Tuart forest was common on the Swan coastal plain until the valuable trees were felled for export and displaced by the urban development around Perth. The wood has many uses as it is dense, hard and water resistant and resists splintering. Remnants of tuart forest occur in state reserves and parks; the tree has occasionally been introduced to other regions of Australia and overseas. Remaining trees are vulnerable to Phytophthora dieback, an often fatal disorder. It was listed as endangered by the International Union for Conservation of Nature as of 2019.

== Description ==
The tree is native to the southwest of Western Australia and typically grows to a height of 10 to 40 metres (33 to 131 ft). The tallest known living tuart is 47 m (154 ft) tall and located in the Tuart Forest National Park near Ludlow. The largest tuart tree has a wood volume of 108 m^{3} (3,800 ft^{3}). Taller trees are often found at the southern end of the trees' range, while smaller trees are found at the northern end. The crown of the tree can spread up to a width of 25 metres (82 ft). The habit of tuart is a tall single stemmed tree, but may form a low and multi-stemmed tree at the edge of stands in response to salinity and winds. The trees have no lignotuber but will form epicormic buds up along the stem.

Tuart has rough, box-like bark over the length of the trunk and the main branches. The bark is rough and finely fibrous. It is grey in colour and breaks into smaller flaky pieces. On large and older stems the bark tends to become tessellated. The branchlets have a circular cross-section and often have oil glands situated in the pith, although sometimes there are not many and they can be difficult to find.

Juvenile leaves are attached to the stem via a stalk and always have an opposite arrangement for the first four to eight nodes along the stem, then have an alternate arrangement. The green and discolorous juvenile leaves have an egg-shaped (ovate) to cordate shape with a length of 9 to 15 cm (3.5 to 5.9 in) and a width of 5.5 to 9.5 cm (2.2 to 3.7 in). Adult leaves are stalked and alternate, with an oval to lanceolate or falcate shape. The leaves are slightly discolorous to concolorous, glossy, light green and thin. The leaf blade is 90 to 180 millimetres (3.5 to 7.1 in) in length and 1.5 to 3 cm (0.59 to 1.18 in) wide, and often curved. The leaves are attached to the limbs or twigs via a petiole that is typically 1 to 3 cm (0.39 to 1.18 in) in length. The apex of the leaf is pointed and the base tapers to the petiole. Tuart leaves have few oil glands, are densely reticulated, where the veins are packed in tightly forming a dense network in the leaf, and have side veins that branch off at an angle of over 45° to compared to the midrib.

The tree flowers between January and April and tends to have a mass flowering event every five to eight years with smaller intermittent flowering events for the years in between. White to cream flowers appear in mid-summer to mid-autumn. The inflorescences form in the leaf axils and are not branched. The peduncle has a length of 1 to 3 mm (0.039 to 0.118 in) with seven buds in each umbel that are attached by 0 to 0.2 cm (0.000 to 0.079 in) long pedicels. The buds have swollen caps, and are said to resemble a small ice cream cone; the caps are 8 to 10 mm (0.31 to 0.39 in) long. The buds are 1.5 to 2.4 cm (0.59 to 0.94 in) in length and have a width of 0.9 to 12 cm (0.35 to 4.72 in) with a hemispherical shaped operculum that is wider than the obconically shaped hypanthium located below. When the outer opercula is shed a scar is left. The stamen are flexed irregularly and contain an oblong anther that is attached at the rear to the filament. The anther can burst open via longitudinal slits. The style is straight and long with a blunt stigma at the tip. The style has a small cavity at the base (or locule) and holds the ovary with four vertical rows of ovules. The flowers are formed in tight clusters made up of around seven flowers. These later form into fruits with a mushroom shape containing small seeds.

The fruits are narrow and 1.0 to 2.5 cm (0.39 to 0.98 in) in length with a broad rim and 1.2 to 1.8 cm (0.47 to 0.71 in) wide. The fruits are attached to the stem via 0 to 0.8 cm (0.00 to 0.31 in) long pedicel. The fruits have an obconic to upside-down bell shape and sometimes have two longitudinal ridges that extend from the pedicel partly along the length. The fruits have a level disc that can be slightly raised or descending and have three to five valves that are partly protruding or exserted.

The seeds are usually released within a year. They are 2 to 3.5 mm (0.079 to 0.138 in) in length with an ovoid to saucer shape and a grey-brown to blackish colour. The upper side of the seed is wrinkled or marked with thin parallel streaks and sometimes has a protruding ridge around the circumference. There is a hilum scar on the rear side where it was once attached to the placenta. The seeds of this species, as for most Eucalypts, germinate quite easily and are considered one of the simplest native plants to grow from seed. Seed production has sizable variation throughout time. Seeds are usually slowly released from the canopy but many can be shed at the same time following events such as fire.

== Taxonomy and naming ==
The species was formally described by the botanist Augustin Pyramus de Candolle in the third volume of his Prodromus Systematis Naturalis Regni Vegetabilis published in 1828. The botanist Jean-Baptiste Leschenault assembled the type collection at the Vasse River near Geographe Bay during 1802, while serving with the Baudin expedition.

The isotype collected by Leschenault is held at Royal Botanic Gardens, Kew.

In 1939, William Blakely and Henry Steedman described two varieties of this species in Contributions from the New South Wales National Herbarium, but the names are listed as synonyms by the Australian Plant Census. The epithet gomphocephala is derived from gomphos, meaning 'club', and kephale, 'head', describing the rounded and overlapping shape of the operculum.

The species is allied as a monophyletic arrangement within the most diverse eucalypt subgenus, Eucalyptus subgen. Symphyomyrtus, recognised as the sole species of its section.

The Noongar peoples named the tree tuart or tooart, moorun, mouarn or duart.

The tree is sometimes referred to as white gum and is the origin for the name of the Perth suburb White Gum Valley.

== Distribution ==
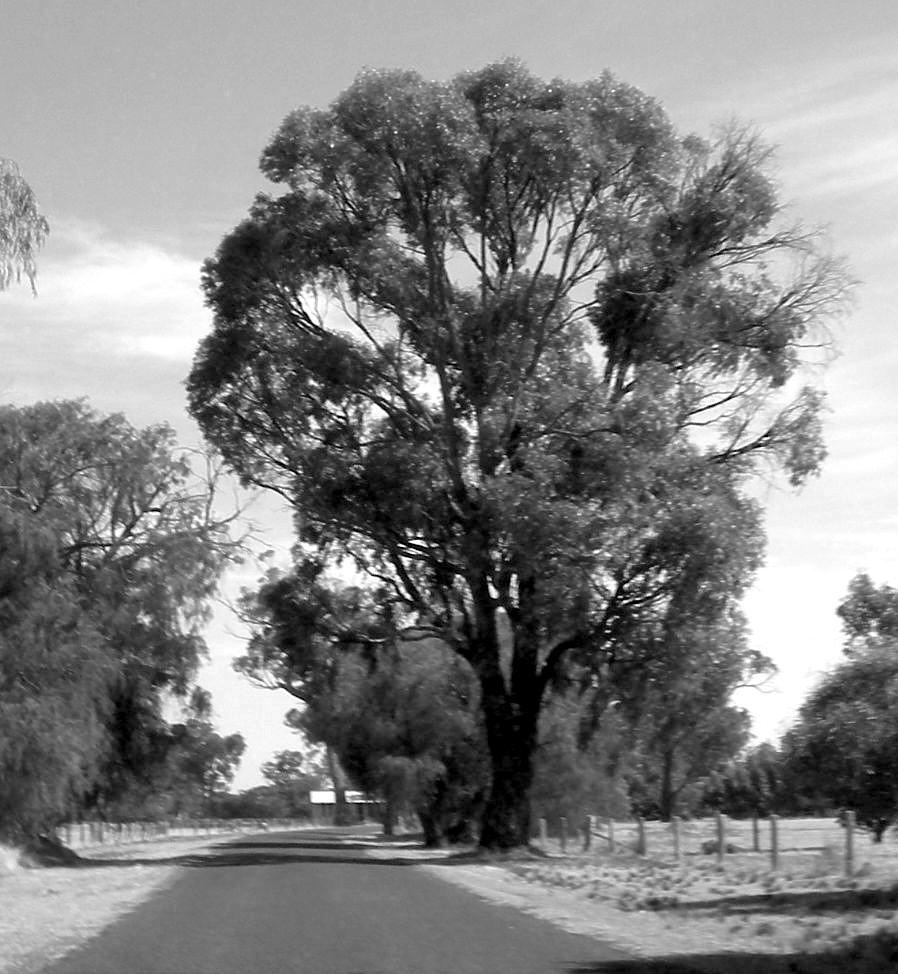
Growing on a roadside at Lake Clifton, 2007

The distribution range of the species is a narrow coastal corridor within the Swan Coastal Plain, extending inland 5 to 10 kilometres (3.1 to 6.2 mi), a continuous corridor south from Yanchep to Busselton. This area has been intensively cleared for changes in agricultural practices, then urbanisation, so that the numbers of tuart trees and area of forest were greatly reduced after the establishment of the Swan River Colony. Outlying patches of the tree are found to the north of Yanchep as far as Geraldton and further inland where rivers intersect the range. The species has become naturalised in other places within Western Australia. A large stand of Tuart is found adjacent to the Jurien Bay cemetery and is listed with the Heritage Council of Western Australia. This stand has scientific value and is regarded as the "northern most natural Tuart stand in the state". It also has heritage value resulting from its position along an historic stock route.

Tuarts have been introduced into parts of Europe, specifically in Spain and Italy including Sicily. The species has also been introduced into several countries in Africa, including Algeria, the Cape Provinces of South Africa, Kenya, Libya, Morocco, Tanzania, Tunisia, Zimbabwe and the Canary Islands. The tree has become naturalised in parts of southern Africa.

E. gomphocephala grows in sandy well drained soils, often over limestone, in sunny positions.

The trees are part of coastal shrubland ecosystems in areas of deep sand. They also will often be part of limited woodland communities in protected areas along the coast. Tuarts are associated with the Quindalup and Spearwood sand dune systems, both of which have calcareous soils. When they occur in woodland or open forest they are often associated with peppermint trees (Agonis flexuosa) in the understorey.

== Uses ==
As a durable hardwood, the timber is sought after for scantlings, structural timber, the construction of railway carriages and boat building. The colouring and grain pattern of the timber also make it a popular choice for furniture manufacturing. Due to over-logging, tuart is a protected tree with conditions placed on felling.

The heartwood is a pale yellow-brown colour with a fine texture and a highly interlocked grain, close and twisted, almost curled back. The green wood has a density of 1,250 kilograms per cubic metre (78 lb/cu ft) and an air-dried density of 1,030 kilograms per cubic metre (64 lb/cu ft).

The flowers are an excellent source for the production of honey. The colour of the product is described as light and creamy and it candies quickly to become hard and dry if properly matured in the hive. In 1939, tuart was noted as a high quality source, although it was determined to be an "undependable source" thirty years later.

Essential oils are extracted from leaves and fruits of the tree. Samples of the leaves contained 0.23% essential oil and samples of the fruits contained 0.34% essential oil. The constituents of the oils collected from the leaves were 1,8-cineole (24.2%), p-cymene (20.7%), α-pinene (14.1%), β-pinene (8.12%), γ-terpinene (6.9%), methyleugenol (6.8%), α-terpineol (4.7%) and limonene (3.8%). Essential oil constituents of tuart fruits were 1,8-cineole (46.69 %), p-cymene (8.99 %), baeckeol (8.57 %), α-pinene (5.21 %), and globulol (4.25 %).

The oils all had some degree of antimicrobial activity, with the essential oil collected from the leaves generally having higher antimicrobial activity than those collected from the fruit.

== Ecology ==
Tuarts are regarded as one of the six forest giants found in Western Australia; the other trees are Corymbia calophylla (marri), Eucalyptus diversicolor (karri), Eucalyptus jacksonii (red tingle), Eucalyptus marginata (jarrah) and Eucalyptus patens (yarri). The informal definition of a giant tree is that it must be significantly larger than other species and exceed 100 m^{3} (3,500 cu ft) in volume.

The tree is moderately tolerant of saline soil and salt-laden winds. It is also drought and frost tolerant. Individual trees may live over four hundred years.

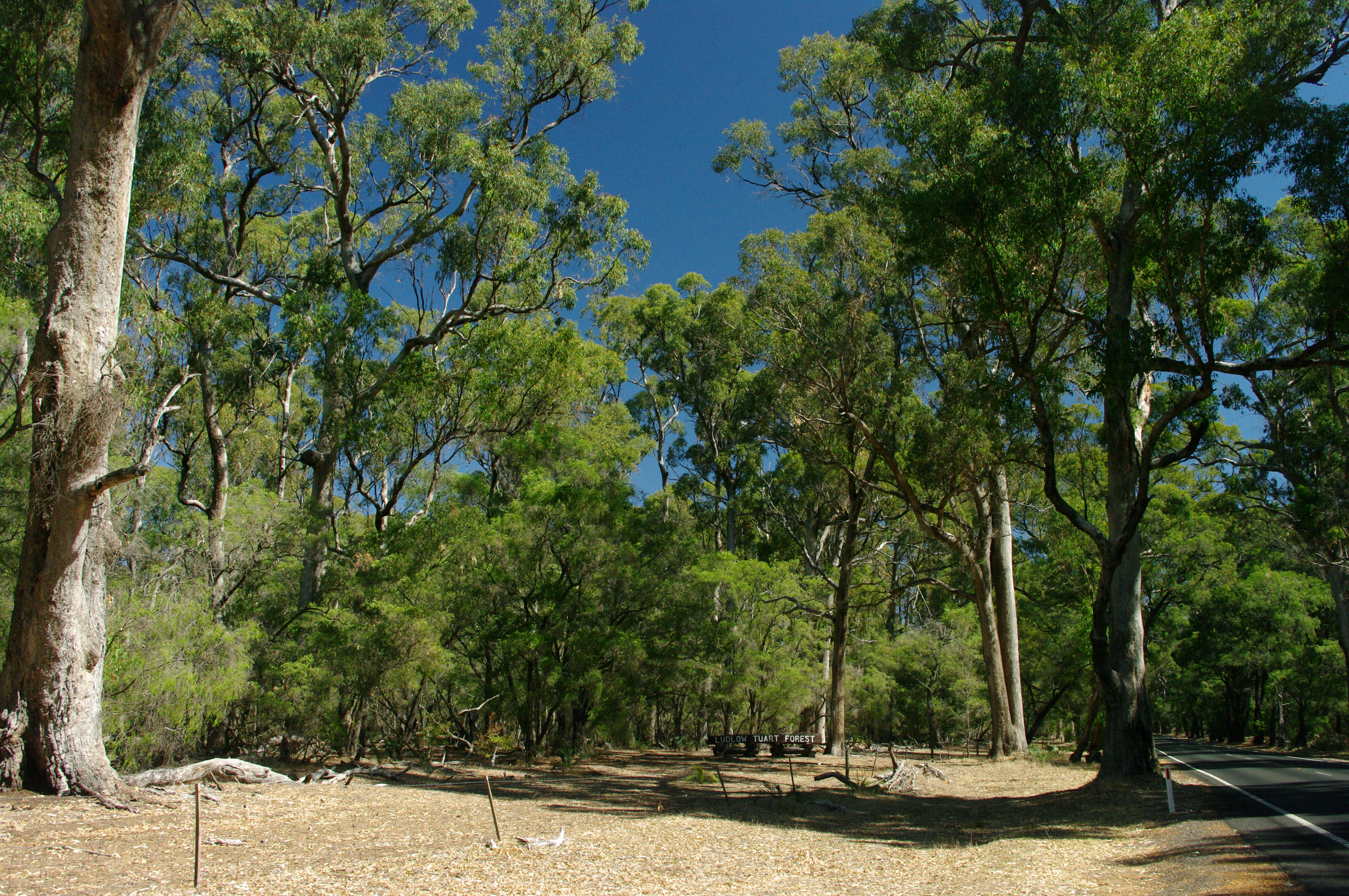
Ludlow forest

Experimental cultivation in the 1930s of the species identified that it was able to grow in areas of low rainfall, as little as 13 inches (330 mm) per annum. Tuarts were introduced to France and grown extensively there by the end of the nineteenth century.

The biodiversity of tuart forest is rich, containing unique assemblages of plants, fungi and animals. A 2009 survey of endophytic fungi on woody species at two tuart woodlands – sampling acacia Acacia cochlearis, A. rostellifera, the sheoak Allocasuarina fraseriana, peppermint Agonis flexuosa, Banksia grandis, sandalwood Santalum acuminatum and eucalypts jarrah Eucalyptus marginata and tuart – found around three quarters of isolates were taxa of the family Botryosphaeriaceae. Eighty percent of these isolates were the species Neofusicoccum australe. Four new taxa, Dothiorella moneti, Dothiorella santali, Neofusicoccum pennatisporum and Aplosporella yalgorensis, resulted from the analysis of the survey. The species Botryosphaeria dothidea was also isolated from acacia and jarrah samples.

Tuart gives its name to a description of an ecological community, as the dominant species of the canopy in tuart woodlands and forests. The area where these occur is greatly reduced, and those remaining are fragmented populations of variable quality. A proposal submitted in 2017 recommended these be listed as critically endangered in the nation's register of threatened ecological communities. Tuart may also occur in the threatened community Banksia Woodlands of the Swan Coastal Plain. The Tuart Woodlands and Forests of the Swan Coastal Plain were listed in 2019 as critically endangered according to the Environment Protection and Biodiversity Conservation Act 1999.

Tuart forest persisted in situ through the Last Glacial Maximum, and extended its range thirty kilometres to the west as the coastline became exposed by lower sea levels. The historical phylogeography of the tuart forest indicates the moderating influence of the marine climate in the Southwest Australian Floristic Region during a period of aridification and other severe climate changes elsewhere on the continent.

=== Destructors ===
The insect Thaumastocoris peregrinus (bronze bug) is native to the east coast of Australia. The sap-sucking pest has infested non-native Eucalyptus plantations, including E. gomphocephala, in Southern Africa and Europe. Severe infestations of the pest cause leaf loss, leaf senescence, thinning of the canopy and in some cases branch dieback.

Phoracantha recurva (eucalyptus longhorned borer) is another problem pest that can affect newly felled trees or sickly trees found within the native range. It will also attack living trees in areas where it has been introduced, particularly in plantations. It is especially problematic in areas that have a water deficit, where loss of trees in Eucalyptus plantations (particularly Eucalyptus recurva) is often experienced during drought.

Tuart normally release seed gradually and the seeds are open to predation by ants, meaning the soil seed bank is kept low. Following events such as fire the seeds will be released all at once, this overwhelms the rate of predation and the temporarily increase the soil seed bank.

The species is vulnerable to dieback associated with fungal species of the genus Phytophthora. A study in 2007 of infected or dead tuart trees and woodland identified isolates of Phytophthora cinnamomi, already implicated in the decline of tuart. Another organism Phytophthora multivora, previously identified as Phytophthora citricola complex, was also found and identified. Damage to reproductive processes by a native predator was first noticed at the end of the nineteenth century. Larvae deposited in flowers by the tuart bud weevil Haplonyx tibialis (Curculionidae) feed on the tissue in the operculum, the female weevil having caused the budding flower to become partly or completely damaged after laying a single egg; the larvae eventually emerge by chewing through the base of the bud.

=== Pollinators ===
Despite no studies having been specifically conducted on E gomphocephala, other studies indicate that Eucalypts such as Eucalyptus muelleriana, Eucalyptus foecunda and Eucalyptus marginata, which create smaller cream or white coloured flowers, have smaller volumes of more concentrated nectar and are grouped to produce large conflorescences will mostly attract insects. Birds and other animals are attracted to these flowers less often. Eucalypts that produce large flowers with red or yellow coloured filaments such as Eucalyptus stoatei, Eucalyptus incrassata and Eucalyptus rhodantha and have larger volumes of less concentrated nectar will attract more mammals and birds. These trees tend to attract fewer insects. Applying these ideas it is thought that E gomphocephala is pollinated by insects and birds. Two species of bird have been recorded browsing the flowers of E gomphocephala: the brown honeyeater and the singing honeyeater. A wide variety of insects have been recorded in mass flowerings of jarrah/tuart woodlands, including 84 different species such as ants, bees, wasps, flies, beetles, moths, butterflies and cockroaches.

== Natural history ==
The extent and maturity of tuart forest and woodland was greatly reduced after colonisation. When Charles Fraser viewed tuart trees during a preliminary exploration toward Guildford he remarked on their "stupendous" size. In 1843 James Drummond recorded specimens that were 9 to 13 m (30 to 43 ft) in circumference at a forest north of Busselton.

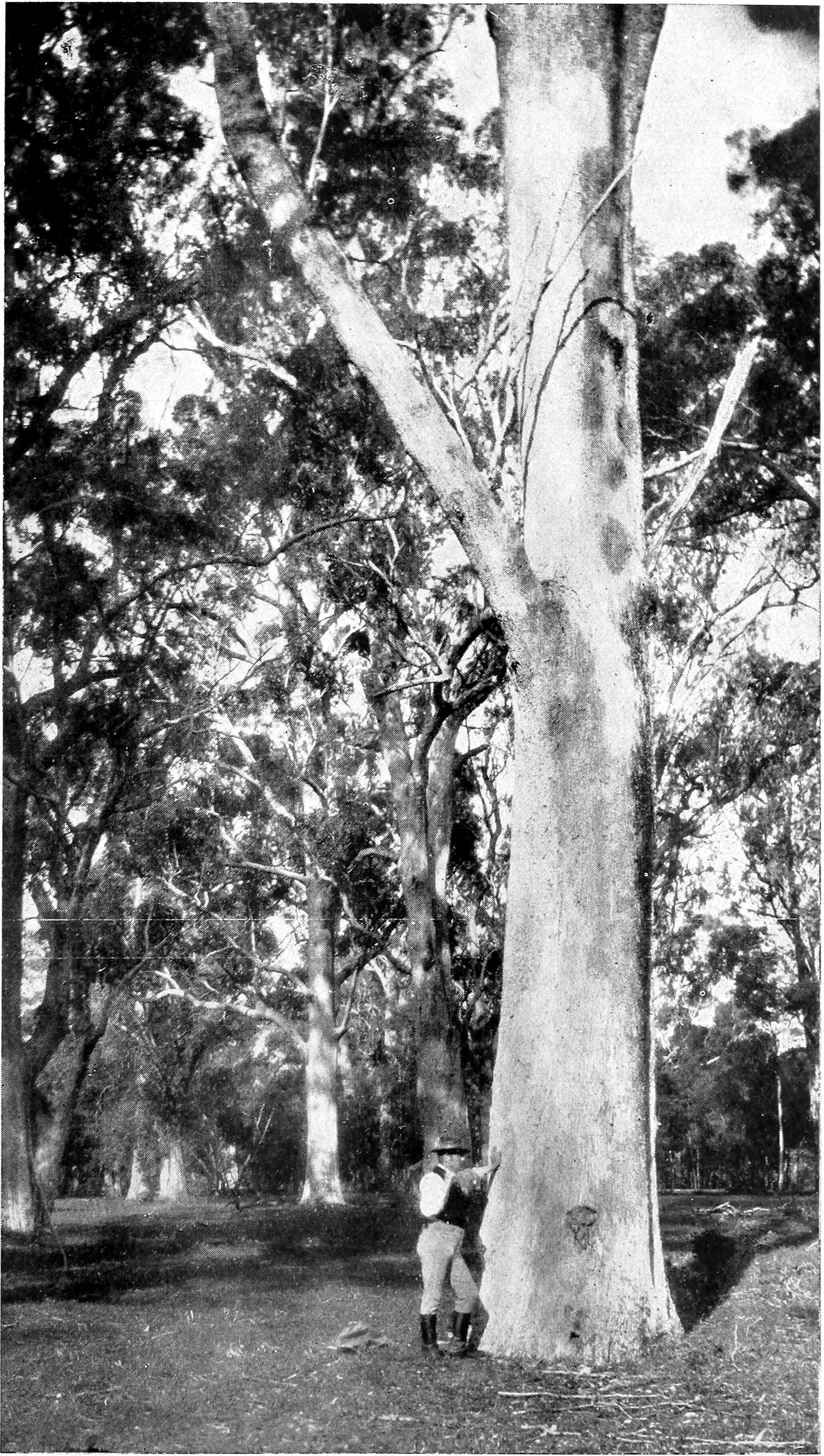
Tuart in Lane-Poole's Primer of Forestry 1927

The Swan River Colony's first sawmill was established in 1833, amongst tuart forest at the foot of Mount Eliza in Kings Park. Some of the timber was used by Henry Trigg for construction of the new government's infrastructure; Trigg describes the "Tewart" wood's desirable qualities - durable, yet workable - as similar to white gum [eucalypt] and the lignum vitae of the South American genus Guaiacum. The four ton cogwheels at the Old Mill, Perth were hewn from this wood. The utility of the timber was remarked on by George Fletcher Moore, the 1830s colonial diarist. The value to industries such as shipbuilding was derived from its resistance to splitting and splintering. The British Admiralty received loads of this timber at Portsmouth and Chatham during the 1850–60s, exported from Wonnerup and Bunbury; an inspection by Thomas Laslett also gave the most favourable possible assessment. A plan to export a four-metre-wide (13 ft) tuart to the 1851 Great Exhibition was abandoned when an adequate saw could not be found. The timber was given additional value due to the proximity of the forests to ports. The land made available by the destruction of forests was recommended by the state's Department of Agriculture in the 1890s for the development of orchards, producing apples, grapes, pears, peaches and nectarines. The timber produced in the state forest during the early twentieth century was used for railway carriages, greatly reducing costs by replacing steel with tuart and wandoo. The wood was only available in small quantities for private uses, notably stair treads and the favoured source for butcher's blocks.

The species was surveyed in 1882 by Surveyor General Malcolm Fraser, his map showing them occurring at an area measuring 130,000 ha (320,000 acres). They were well known to the settlers of the Swan River Colony; the first road from the port to the capital passed through what they named as Claremont Tuart Forest. The first state conservator of forest, John Ednie Brown, reported the remaining extent of tuart forest as 81,000 ha (200,000 acres) in 1895, and was impressed by straight trunked specimens to 50 m (160 ft) high and 7 m (23 ft) circumference, while conceding the density and condition of them prior to his survey were not known to him. The 1903-04 Royal Commission on Forestry, hearing evidence from sawmiller and government member H. J. Yelverton, reported just over 40,000 ha (99,000 acres) remained, and that reduced tonnage from areas where "prime trees", those over 0.8 m (2 ft 7 in) in diameter, were mostly harvested had not been found. The conservation of this species was proposed in the commission's summary, emphasising "Tuart is the most valuable tree …". This eventually took the form of a regulation on export of the tuart, although this was to reserve the timber for its biggest consumer, the state's railway system.

When a political means of conserving forest was enacted in 1918, the state conservator Charles Lane Poole's recommendation was the purchase of a 400 ha (990 acres) area near Wonnerup. The State Forest No. 1 was described as "… the last remaining virgin tuart in the world". The State Forest was increased with adjoining areas to around 2,500 ha (6,200 acres) by 1922, and slightly reduced in 1927 by the conservator S. L. Kessel. The state sawmill supplying the railway operated in the forest until 1929, using "over mature" trees for the railway trucks being built at the Midland works.

At the beginning of the twenty first century most of the tuart forest had been felled or cleared. Prior to European settlement the tuart forests occupied an area of 125,400 ha (310,000 acres) and they now cover an area of 17,000 ha (42,000 acres). What remained was recognised as declining in diversity and health of this tree and the assemblages of associated plants, animals and fungi.

It was listed as endangered by the International Union for Conservation of Nature as of 2019. The species has an estimated extent of occurrence of 19,490 km^{2} (7,530 sq mi) and an estimated area of occupancy of 256 km^{2} (99 sq mi) ranging from Jurien in the north to Ludlow State Forest in the south. The population is declining.

== Gallery ==
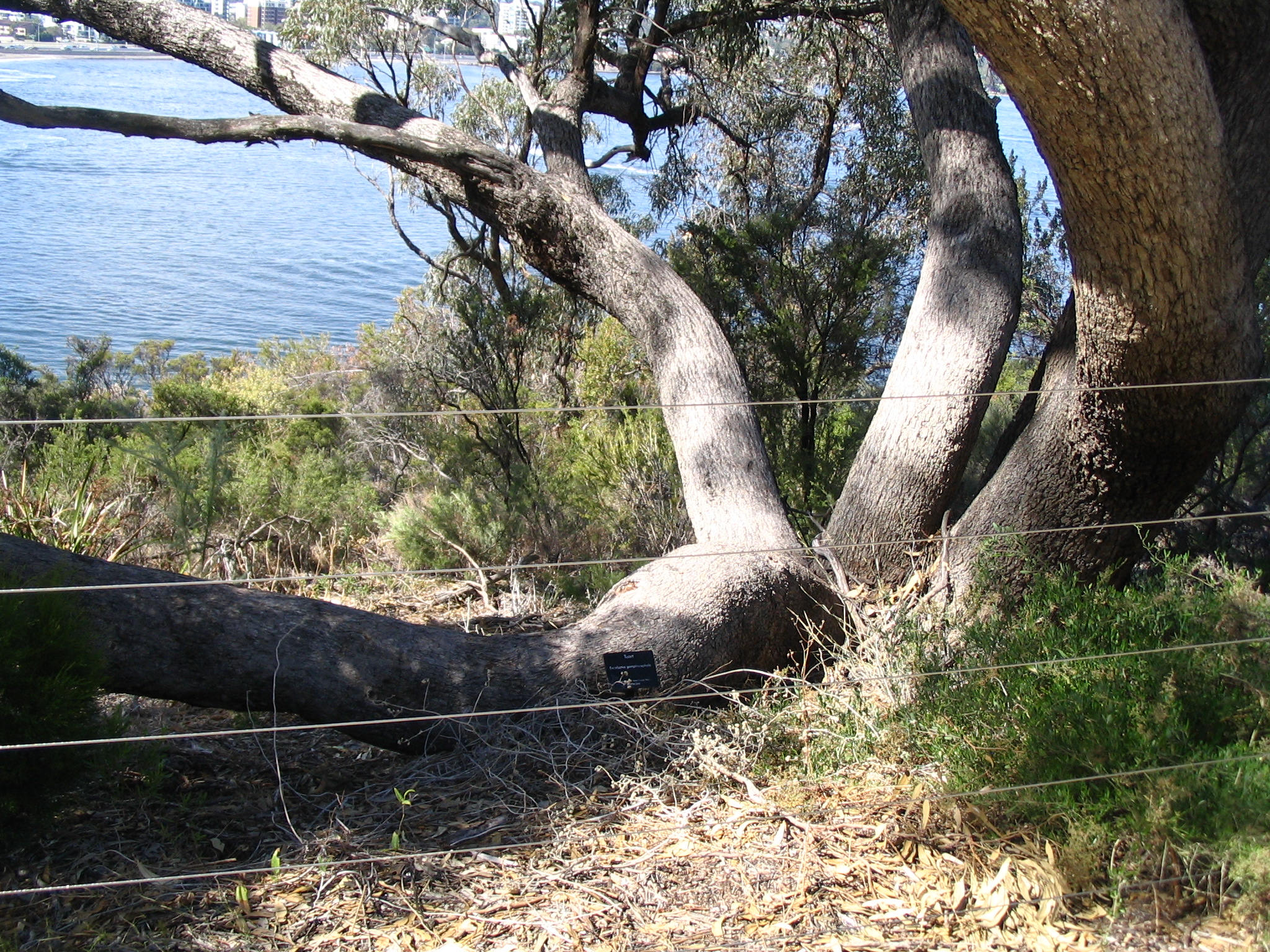
Kings park

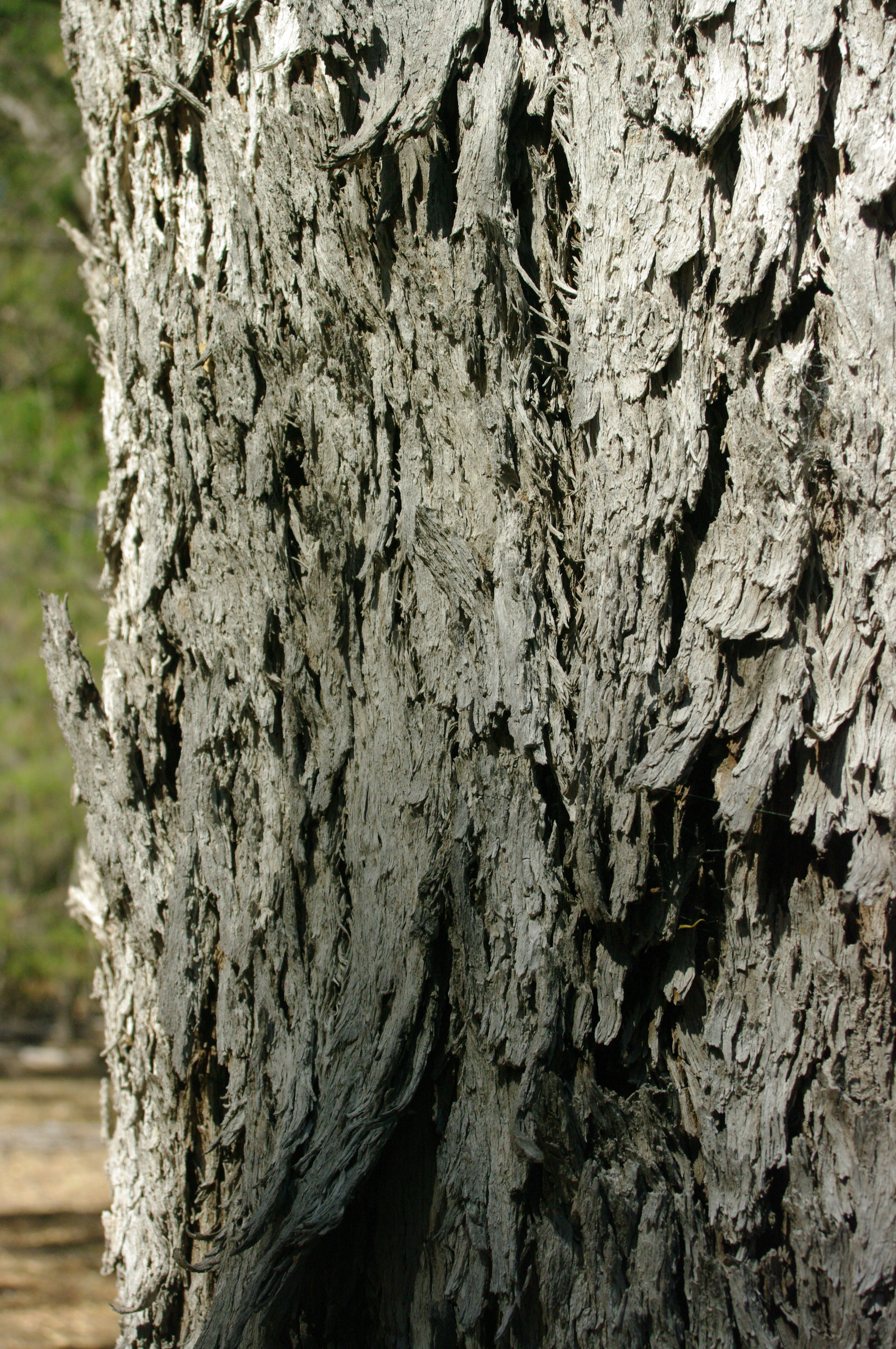
Bark on trunk

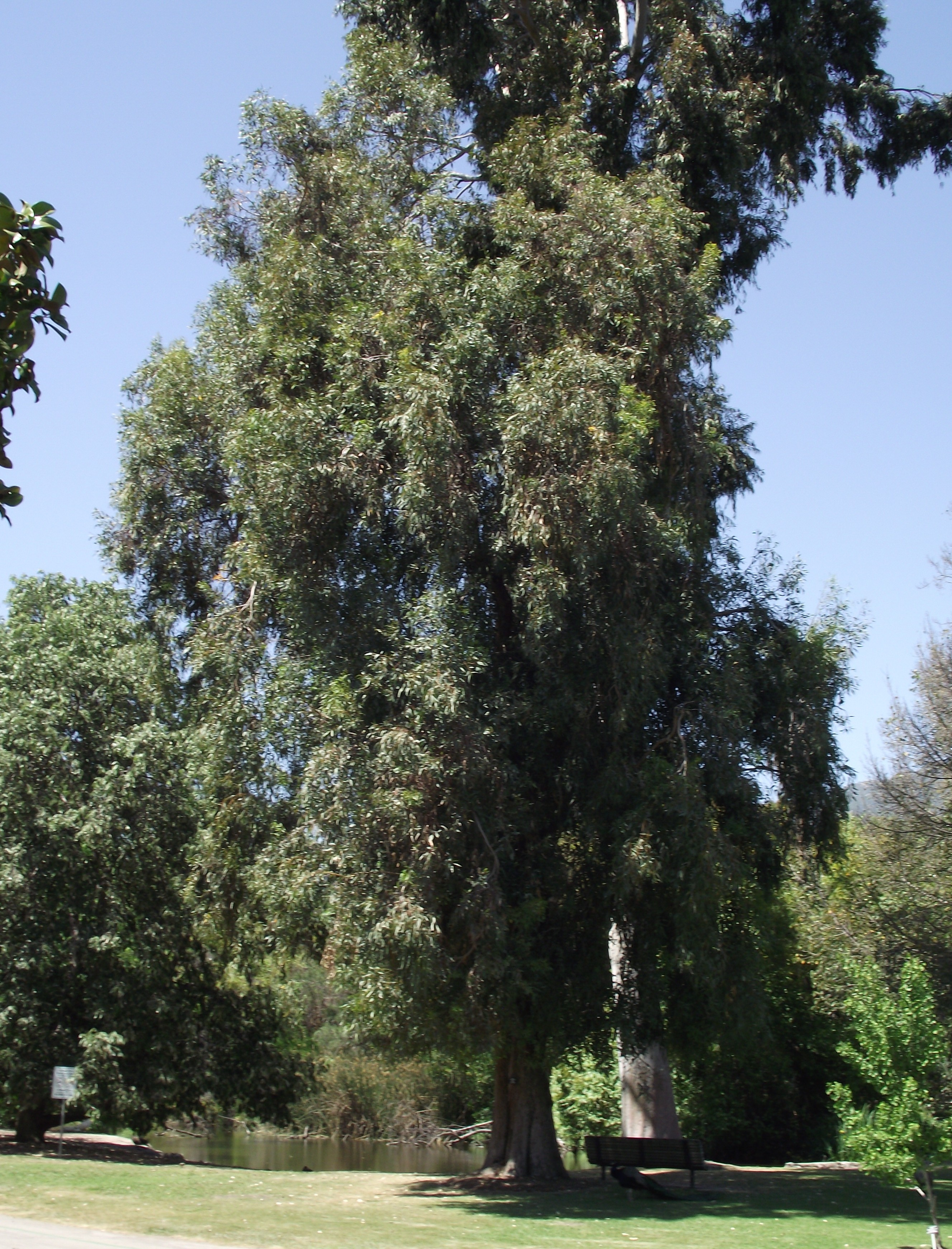
Los Angeles County Arboretum, Arcadia, California

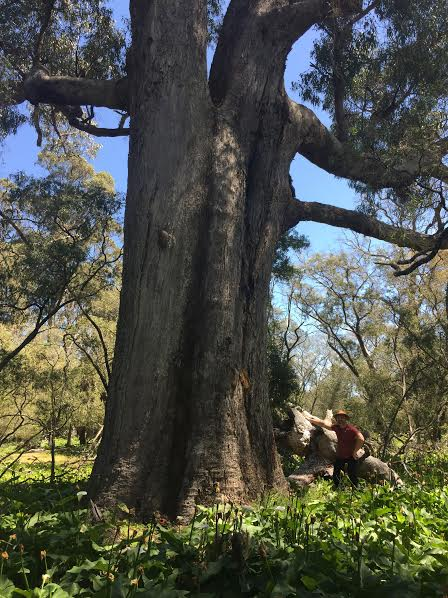
The Wonnerup Giant, the largest tuart

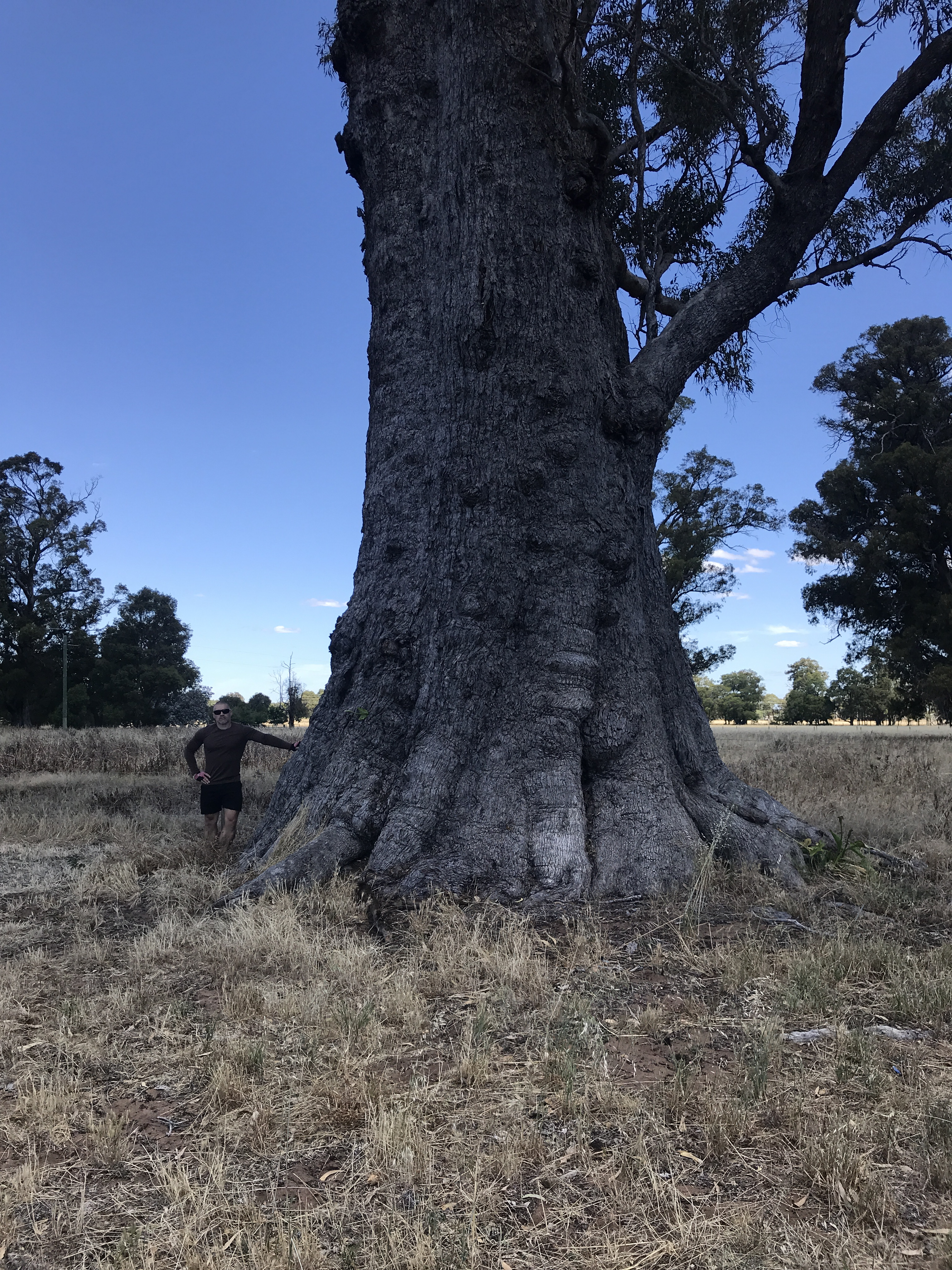
The Shedded Giant, the largest girthed tuart

== See also ==
- Tuart Hill, Western Australia
- Tuart spider orchid (Caladenia georgei)
