= Dothiorella ulmi =

Scientific classification
- Kingdom: Fungi
- Division: Ascomycota
- Class: Dothideomycetes
- Order: Botryosphaeriales
- Family: Botryosphaeriaceae
- Genus: Dothiorella
- Species: D. ulmi

Binomial name
- Dothiorella ulmi Verrall & C. May, Mycologia 29: 322 (1937)

Synonyms
- Deuterophoma ulmi (Verrall & C. May) Goid. & Ruggieri; Plectophomella ulmi (Verrall & C. May) Redfern & B. Sutton, (1981)

Species of fungus

Dothiorella ulmi is a fungal plant pathogen that causes die-back of elm. It was first identified in 1929 on American elm (Ulmus americana) and was thought to belong to the order Sphaeropsidales but was later described as Cephalosporium sp. before formally being identified as Dothiorella ulmi in 1937.
