= Dothiorella pretoriensis =

Scientific classification
- Kingdom: Fungi
- Division: Ascomycota
- Class: Dothideomycetes
- Order: Botryosphaeriales
- Family: Botryosphaeriaceae
- Genus: Dothiorella
- Species: D. pretoriensis

Binomial name
- Dothiorella pretoriensis (Jami, Gryzenh., Slippers & M.J. Wingf.) Abdollahz. & A.J.L. Phillips

Synonyms
- Spencermartinsia pretoriensis Jami, Gryzenh., Slippers & M.J. Wingf.

Species of fungus

Dothiorella pretoriensis is an endophytic fungus that might be a latent pathogen. It was found on Acacia karroo, a common tree in southern Africa.
