= Phytophthora multivora =

Scientific classification
- Domain: Eukaryota
- Clade: Sar
- Clade: Stramenopiles
- Division: Oomycota
- Class: Peronosporomycetes
- Order: Peronosporales
- Family: Peronosporaceae
- Genus: Phytophthora
- Species: P. multivora

Binomial name
- Phytophthora multivora P.M. Scott & T. Jung

Species of single-celled organism

Phytophthora multivora is a species of Oomycete, water moulds, identified as a plant pathogen implicated in dieback. It was first isolated in tuart forest of Southwest Australia in a study of the decline of tuart Eucalyptus gomphocephala, jarrah Eucalyptus marginata, peppermint Agonis and banksia species.

The species was found to occur in dead and dying woody species, Eucalyptus gomphocephala, E. marginata, Agonis flexuosa, banksias B. menziesii and B. grandis and at the fine roots of E. marginata and Banksia littoralis. The study area included samples at Yalgorup, Jarrahdale, Wanneroo, Walpole and Pemberton in Western Australia.

The epithet of the species is in reference to the wide range of flora it infects.
