= Dothiorella moneti =

Scientific classification
- Kingdom: Fungi
- Division: Ascomycota
- Class: Dothideomycetes
- Order: Botryosphaeriales
- Family: Botryosphaeriaceae
- Genus: Dothiorella
- Species: D. moneti

Binomial name
- Dothiorella moneti Taylor et al. 2009

Species of fungus

Dothiorella moneti is an endophytic fungus that might be a canker pathogen, specifically for Eucalyptus gomphocephala. It was isolated from said trees in Western Australia.
