= Dothiorella gregaria =

Scientific classification
- Kingdom: Fungi
- Division: Ascomycota
- Class: Dothideomycetes
- Order: Botryosphaeriales
- Family: Botryosphaeriaceae
- Genus: Dothiorella
- Species: D. gregaria

Binomial name
- Dothiorella gregaria Sacc. (1881)

Species of fungus

Dothiorella gregaria is a fungal plant pathogen.
