= Botryosphaeria viticola =

Scientific classification
- Kingdom: Fungi
- Division: Ascomycota
- Class: Dothideomycetes
- Order: Botryosphaeriales
- Family: Botryosphaeriaceae
- Genus: Dothiorella
- Species: D. viticola

Binomial name
- Dothiorella viticola A.J.L. Phillips & J. Luque 2006

Synonyms
- Botryosphaeria viticola A.J.L. Phillips & J. Luque, 2006; Spencermartinsia viticola A.J.L. Phillips & J. Luque, 2008

Species of fungus

Dothiorella viticola is a species of fungus in the genus Dothiorella responsible for a grapevine trunk disease. It has been isolated from pruned canes of Vitis vinifera cv. Garnatxa Negra in Catalonia, Spain.
