= Dothiorella =

Scientific classification
- Kingdom: Fungi
- Division: Ascomycota
- Class: Dothideomycetes
- Order: Botryosphaeriales
- Family: Botryosphaeriaceae
- Genus: Dothiorella; Sacc. 1880

Species
- See text

Synonyms
- Spencermartinsia A.J.L. Phillips & J. Luque, 2008

Genus of fungi

Dothiorella is a genus of fungi in the family Botryosphaeriaceae. There are 3 subgenera and approximately 332 species.

== Species ==
- Dothiorella aberrans
- Dothiorella acaciae
- Dothiorella aceris
- Dothiorella acervulata
- Dothiorella adanensis
- Dothiorella advena
- Dothiorella aesculi
- Dothiorella agavicola
- Dothiorella ailanthina
- Dothiorella alchorneae
- Dothiorella alfaedensis
- Dothiorella alhagi
- Dothiorella allescheri
- Dothiorella alpina (Y. Zhang ter & Min Zhang, 2016)
- Dothiorella amsoniae
- Dothiorella amygdali
- Dothiorella annonae
- Dothiorella apocyni
- Dothiorella aquilegiae
- Dothiorella arachidis
- Dothiorella araucariae
- Dothiorella argyreiae
- Dothiorella armeniaca
- Dothiorella aromatica
- Dothiorella arundinacea
- Dothiorella asiminae
- Dothiorella asparagi
- Dothiorella aterrima
- Dothiorella aucubae
- Dothiorella banksiae
- Dothiorella barringtoniae
- Dothiorella berengeriana
- Dothiorella betulae
- Dothiorella betulae-odoratae
- Dothiorella betulicola
- Dothiorella biotae
- Dothiorella bohemica
- Dothiorella bokensis
- Dothiorella bolbophila
- Dothiorella botrya
- Dothiorella botryosphaerioides
- Dothiorella bougainvilleae
- Dothiorella boussingaultiae
- Dothiorella brassicae
- Dothiorella brevicollis
- Dothiorella brevipes
- Dothiorella broussonetiae
- Dothiorella caballeroi
- Dothiorella caespitosa
- Dothiorella calophylli
- Dothiorella calospora
- Dothiorella calotropidis
- Dothiorella campsidis
- Dothiorella canadensis
- Dothiorella candollei
- Dothiorella capri-amissi (F.J.J. Van der Walt, Slippers & G.J. Marais et al., 2014)
- Dothiorella caricis
- Dothiorella carpinicola
- Dothiorella carthami
- Dothiorella caryotae
- Dothiorella caseariae
- Dothiorella castaneae
- Dothiorella castillejae
- Dothiorella casuarinae
- Dothiorella catalpae
- Dothiorella cedrelae
- Dothiorella celastri
- Dothiorella celtidis
- Dothiorella cephalandrae
- Dothiorella cercidospora
- Dothiorella chamaedoreae
- Dothiorella chenopodii
- Dothiorella chilensis
- Dothiorella chimonanthi
- Dothiorella chrysopogonis
- Dothiorella cisti
- Dothiorella citricola (A.J.L. Phillips & Abdollahz., 2014)
- Dothiorella clavigera
- Dothiorella clypeata
- Dothiorella cneori
- Dothiorella cocoës
- Dothiorella codiaeicola
- Dothiorella coggygriae
- Dothiorella concaviuscula
- Dothiorella congesta
- Dothiorella convolvuli
- Dothiorella coronillae
- Dothiorella corylina
- Dothiorella crastophila
- Dothiorella crataegi
- Dothiorella crepinii
- Dothiorella cupressi
- Dothiorella cydoniae
- Dothiorella daniellae
- Dothiorella daphnes
- Dothiorella dasycarpi
- Dothiorella dauci
- Dothiorella davidiae
- Dothiorella davisii
- Dothiorella decorticata
- Dothiorella desmostachyae
- Dothiorella diatrypea
- Dothiorella diatrypoides
- Dothiorella diospyri
- Dothiorella dispar
- Dothiorella divergens
- Dothiorella dominicana
- Dothiorella dracaenae
- Dothiorella dryophila
- Dothiorella dulcispinae
- Dothiorella dura
- Dothiorella ellisii
- Dothiorella endorrhodia
- Dothiorella ephedrae
- Dothiorella erumpens
- Dothiorella erythraea
- Dothiorella erythrinae
- Dothiorella eucalypti
- Dothiorella eucalyptorum
- Dothiorella eugeniae
- Dothiorella euonymicola
- Dothiorella euonymi-japonicae
- Dothiorella euphorbiae
- Dothiorella euphorbii
- Dothiorella everhartii
- Dothiorella excavata
- Dothiorella fabae
- Dothiorella fici
- Dothiorella ficina
- Dothiorella foederata
- Dothiorella frangulae
- Dothiorella fraxinea
- Dothiorella fraxini
- Dothiorella fraxinicola
- Dothiorella fructicola
- Dothiorella galegae
- Dothiorella gallae
- Dothiorella gaurensis
- Dothiorella genistae
- Dothiorella glandaria
- Dothiorella glandicola
- Dothiorella gleditschiae
- Dothiorella graminicola
- Dothiorella gregaria (Sacc. 1881)
- Dothiorella guaranitica
- Dothiorella hawaiiensis
- Dothiorella henriquesiana
- Dothiorella hibiscicola
- Dothiorella hicoriae
- Dothiorella hippocastani
- Dothiorella hispalensis
- Dothiorella hoffmannii
- Dothiorella holstii
- Dothiorella hypomutilospora
- Dothiorella iberica
- Dothiorella ilicella
- Dothiorella ilicicola
- Dothiorella inaequalis
- Dothiorella indica
- Dothiorella insulana
- Dothiorella inversa
- Dothiorella ipomoeae
- Dothiorella jaapiana
- Dothiorella jasminicola
- Dothiorella juglandaria
- Dothiorella juniperi
- Dothiorella kanoorii
- Dothiorella kilinensis
- Dothiorella kraunhiae
- Dothiorella ladharensis
- Dothiorella lagenariae
- Dothiorella lagerstroemiae
- Dothiorella lanceolata
- Dothiorella latitans
- Dothiorella laurina
- Dothiorella ledi
- Dothiorella lentiformis
- Dothiorella leucaenicola
- Dothiorella limbalis
- Dothiorella limonis
- Dothiorella lineolata
- Dothiorella liriodendri
- Dothiorella longicollis
- Dothiorella lonicerae
- Dothiorella macadamiae
- Dothiorella macarangae
- Dothiorella maculosa
- Dothiorella magnifructa
- Dothiorella mahagoni
- Dothiorella major
- Dothiorella mali
- Dothiorella mangifericola (Abdollahz., A. Javadi & A.J.L. Phillips, 2014)
- Dothiorella manshurica
- Dothiorella meliae
- Dothiorella microspora
- Dothiorella minor
- Dothiorella mirabilis
- Dothiorella moneti
- Dothiorella monsterae
- Dothiorella mori
- Dothiorella multicocca
- Dothiorella multiplex
- Dothiorella myricariae
- Dothiorella nectandrae
- Dothiorella negundinis
- Dothiorella nelumbii
- Dothiorella nucis
- Dothiorella nuptialis
- Dothiorella oenotherae
- Dothiorella olearum
- Dothiorella ononidicola
- Dothiorella opuntiae
- Dothiorella ornella
- Dothiorella oxycedri
- Dothiorella palawanensis
- Dothiorella paliuri
- Dothiorella parasitica
- Dothiorella paucilocelata
- Dothiorella paulowniae
- Dothiorella peckiana
- Dothiorella pedrosensis
- Dothiorella pericarpica
- Dothiorella peucedani
- Dothiorella philodendri
- Dothiorella phoenicis
- Dothiorella phomiformis
- Dothiorella phomopsis
- Dothiorella phormiana
- Dothiorella photiniae
- Dothiorella physalospora
- Dothiorella pinea
- Dothiorella pinicola
- Dothiorella pini-silvestris
- Dothiorella pirottiana
- Dothiorella pistaciicola
- Dothiorella pithyophila
- Dothiorella pittospori
- Dothiorella pittosporina
- Dothiorella pitya
- Dothiorella placenta
- Dothiorella platani
- Dothiorella platensis
- Dothiorella plurivora (Abdollahz., A. Javadi & A.J.L. Phillips, 2014)
- Dothiorella populea
- Dothiorella populina
- Dothiorella populnea
- Dothiorella pretoriensis (Jami et al., 2012)
- Dothiorella prosopidina
- Dothiorella proteiformis
- Dothiorella pseudodiblasta
- Dothiorella pyri
- Dothiorella pyricola
- Dothiorella quercina
- Dothiorella radicans
- Dothiorella ranunculi
- Dothiorella reniformis
- Dothiorella rhaphidophorae
- Dothiorella rhododendri
- Dothiorella rhoina
- Dothiorella ribicola
- Dothiorella ricini
- Dothiorella rimicola
- Dothiorella robiniae
- Dothiorella rosatti
- Dothiorella rosulata (F.J.J. Van der Walt, Slippers & G.J. Marais, 2014)
- Dothiorella rugulosa
- Dothiorella rumicis
- Dothiorella saccharina
- Dothiorella salviae
- Dothiorella sanninii
- Dothiorella santali
- Dothiorella santaremica
- Dothiorella saponariae
- Dothiorella sarmentorum
- Dothiorella scandens
- Dothiorella schizomyiae
- Dothiorella schoenocauli
- Dothiorella scirpi-riparii
- Dothiorella scopulina
- Dothiorella scripta
- Dothiorella senecionis
- Dothiorella sibiraeae
- Dothiorella sileris
- Dothiorella sisalanae
- Dothiorella sorbina
- Dothiorella partiicola
- Dothiorella spathoglottidicola
- Dothiorella sterculiae
- Dothiorella stramonii
- Dothiorella stratosa
- Dothiorella strobilina
- Dothiorella strobilomorphospora
- Dothiorella stromatica
- Dothiorella syringae
- Dothiorella syringicola
- Dothiorella tamaricicola
- Dothiorella tamaricis
- Dothiorella tecomae
- Dothiorella thripina
- Dothiorella thripsita
- Dothiorella tiliae
- Dothiorella togashiana
- Dothiorella torulosa
- Dothiorella toxica
- Dothiorella tricholenae
- Dothiorella tristaniae
- Dothiorella tubericola
- Dothiorella turconii
- Dothiorella ulmi
- Dothiorella ulmicola
- Dothiorella undulata
- Dothiorella urae
- Dothiorella vagans
- Dothiorella valentina
- Dothiorella viburni
- Dothiorella vinosa
- Dothiorella viscariae
- Dothiorella viticis
- Dothiorella viticola A.J.L. Phillips & J. Luque, 2008
- Dothiorella westralis (W.M. Pitt, Úrbez-Torr. & Trouillas, 2015)
- Dothiorella winteri
- Dothiorella woronowii
- Dothriorella yuanna (Y. Zhang ter & Min Zhang, 2016)
- Dothiorella yuccicarpa
- Dothiorella zeae
