= Dothiorella dominicana =

Scientific classification
- Kingdom: Fungi
- Division: Ascomycota
- Class: Dothideomycetes
- Order: Botryosphaeriales
- Family: Botryosphaeriaceae
- Genus: Dothiorella
- Species: D. dominicana

Binomial name
- Dothiorella dominicana Petr. & Cif. (1930)

Species of fungus

Dothiorella dominicana is a fungal plant pathogen that infects Mangifera indica, the mango tree. In South Africa, it is known as blossom blight. Infection with D. dominicana causes rapid drying and partial or complete death of the inflorescence, and can also cause branch die-back.
