= Dothiorella dulcispinae =

Scientific classification
- Kingdom: Fungi
- Division: Ascomycota
- Class: Dothideomycetes
- Order: Botryosphaeriales
- Family: Botryosphaeriaceae
- Genus: Dothiorella
- Species: D. dulcispinae

Binomial name
- Dothiorella dulcispinae Jami et al., 2012

Species of fungus

Dothiorella dulcispinae is an endophytic fungus that might be a latent plant pathogen. It was found on Acacia karroo, a common tree in southern Africa.
