= Dothiorella aromatica =

Scientific classification
- Kingdom: Fungi
- Division: Ascomycota
- Class: Dothideomycetes
- Order: Botryosphaeriales
- Family: Botryosphaeriaceae
- Genus: Dothiorella
- Species: D. aromatica

Binomial name
- Dothiorella aromatica (Sacc.) Petr. & Syd. (1927)

Species of fungus

Dothiorella aromatica is a fungal plant pathogen that causes fruit rot of avocado.
