= Aplosporella yalgorensis =

Scientific classification
- Kingdom: Fungi
- Division: Ascomycota
- Class: Dothideomycetes
- Order: Botryosphaeriales
- Family: Botryosphaeriaceae
- Genus: Aplosporella
- Species: A. yalgorensis

Binomial name
- Aplosporella yalgorensis Taylor et al., 2009

Species of fungus

Aplosporella yalgorensis is an endophytic fungus that might be a canker pathogen, specifically for Eucalyptus gomphocephala. It was isolated from said trees in Western Australia.

The epithet of the species, yalgorensis, is derived from the name of Yalgorup National Park, meaning the type location was at 'yalgor'.
