= Aplosporella =

Scientific classification
- Kingdom: Fungi
- Division: Ascomycota
- Class: Dothideomycetes
- Order: Botryosphaeriales
- Family: Botryosphaeriaceae
- Genus: Aplosporella; Speg. 1880

Species
- See text.

Genus of fungi

Aplosporella is a genus of fungi in the family Botryosphaeriaceae.

As of 3 September 2023, the GBIF lists up to 225 species, while Species Fungorum lists about 224 species (out of 267 records).

Wijayawardene et al. 2020, places 10 species in the genus in its own family Aplosporellaceae Slippers, Boissin & Crous. Species Fungorum also accepts the Aplosporellaceae family.

== Species ==
As accepted by Species Fungorum;

- Aplosporella abexaminans S.K. Verma, S. Yadav & Raghv. Singh (2021)
- Aplosporella acaciae (Petr.) Petr. (1926)
- Aplosporella acaciigena S. Ahmad & Arshad (1972)
- Aplosporella africana F.J.J. Van der Walt, Slippers & G.J. Marais (2014)
- Aplosporella aleuritis Agnihothr. & Hadfield (1960)
- Aplosporella allamandae V.G. Rao & B.R.D. Yadav (1991)
- Aplosporella alnicola (Peck) Petr. & Syd. (1926)
- Aplosporella amelanchieris (Dearn.) Petr. & Syd. (1926)
- Aplosporella amygdalina Dearn. & Barthol. (1926)
- Aplosporella annonae (Chona & Munjal) D.K. Agarwal, Chowdhry & A.K. Sarbhoy (1992)
- Aplosporella aquifolii (Westend.) H. Ruppr. (1959)
- Aplosporella aristolochiae Subhedar & V.G. Rao (1979)
- Aplosporella artabotrydicola Kalani (1963)
- Aplosporella artocarpi Trakun., L. Lombard & Crous (2014)
- Aplosporella asiminae (Ellis & Everh.) Petr. (1953)
- Aplosporella astragalina S. Ahmad (1971)
- Aplosporella astrocaryi Henn. (1904)
- Aplosporella aurangabadensis R. Rao (1966)
- Aplosporella azadirachtae Tilak & R. Rao (1964)
- Aplosporella baccharidicola (Dearn.) Petr. & Syd. (1926)
- Aplosporella bakeriana Sacc. (1919)
- Aplosporella baptisiae Petr. & Syd. (1926)
- Aplosporella baxteri Cooke & Massee (1887)
- Aplosporella beaumontiana S. Ahmad (1962)
- Aplosporella betulae Died. (1914)
- Aplosporella bougainvilleae (Sousa da Câmara) Petr. & Syd. (1926)
- Aplosporella bromeliae Gonz. Frag. & Cif. (1928)
- Aplosporella burnhamii Dearn. (1917)
- Aplosporella burserae Luke & C.N. Reddy (1978)
- Aplosporella cadabae S. Ahmad (1962)
- Aplosporella caesalpiniae (Petr.) Petr. (1926)
- Aplosporella calycanthi Fairm. (1910)
- Aplosporella capparis (Died.) Petr. & Syd. (1926)
- Aplosporella carpinea (Sacc. & Briard) Petr. (1925)
- Aplosporella castaneae (Tognini) Petr. (1926)
- Aplosporella casuarinae Petr. (1953)
- Aplosporella ceanothi (Dearn. & House) Petr. & Syd. (1926)
- Aplosporella celtidis Ellis & Everh. (1894)
- Aplosporella cephalandrae S. Ahmad (1964)
- Aplosporella cercidis Ellis & Barthol. (1905)
- Aplosporella chamaecristae Petr. (1953)
- Aplosporella chromolaenae Mapook & K.D. Hyde (2020)
- Aplosporella clematidis (Dearn. & House) Petr. & Syd. (1926)
- Aplosporella clerodendri S. Ahmad (1962)
- Aplosporella clintonii (Peck) Petr. & Syd. (1927)
- Aplosporella commixta Barthol. (1905)
- Aplosporella congoensis Har. & Pat. (1911)
- Aplosporella coryli (Ellis & Everh.) H. Ruppr. (1959)
- Aplosporella crotonis (Chona & Munjal) D.K. Agarwal, Chowdhry & A.K. Sarbhoy (1992)
- Aplosporella crypta Petch (1917)
- Aplosporella cryptostegiae (Chona & Munjal) S. Ahmad (1963)
- Aplosporella cupressicola S. Ahmad (1971)
- Aplosporella cydoniae (Cooke & Ellis) Petr. (1953)
- Aplosporella cydoniaecola (Pass.) Săvul. & Sandu (1933)
- Aplosporella cymbidii V.G. Rao & B.R.D. Yadav (1989)
- Aplosporella cynanchina S. Ahmad (1962)
- Aplosporella cytisi Savelli (1918)
- Aplosporella cytisigena Bubák & Vleugel (1916)
- Aplosporella dalbergiae (Died.) Petr. & Syd. (1926)
- Aplosporella demersa (Bonord.) Petr. & Syd. (1926)
- Aplosporella diatrypoides Ellis & Barthol. (1905)
- Aplosporella diospyri Petr. & Syd. (1926)
- Aplosporella doemiae S. Ahmad (1971)
- Aplosporella dracaenarum (Penz. & Sacc.) Petr. (1926)
- Aplosporella dryobalonopis S.N.S. Srivast. (1957)
- Aplosporella dulcamarae Dearn. & House (1923)
- Aplosporella elaeagni Gutner (1929)
- Aplosporella elaeagnina (Fairm.) Petr. & Syd. (1926)
- Aplosporella elaeidis Pat. & Har. (1900)
- Aplosporella embeliae N.D. Sharma (1982)
- Aplosporella enterolobii Bat. & C. Ram (1967)
- Aplosporella ephedricola S. Ahmad (1971)
- Aplosporella eriobotryae (Speg.) Petr. & Syd. (1926)
- Aplosporella fabiformis (Pass. & Thüm.) Petr. & Syd. (1927)
- Aplosporella fautreyana Allesch. (1901)
- Aplosporella fici (Chona & Munjal) D.K. Agarwal, Chowdhry & A.K. Sarbhoy (1992)
- Aplosporella fici-elasticae Petr. (1926)
- Aplosporella ficina Urries (1941)
- Aplosporella flacourtiae Subhedar, A. Pande & V.G. Rao (1995)
- Aplosporella francisci D. Sacc. (1896)
- Aplosporella fraxini Died. (1914)
- Aplosporella fusca (Preuss) Petr. (1925)
- Aplosporella gardeniae J.V. Kachroo (1966)
- Aplosporella ginkgonis C.M. Tian, Z. Du & K.D. Hyde (2017)
- Aplosporella gleditschiae Grove (1919)
- Aplosporella gleditschiicola (Cooke) Petr. & Syd. (1926)
- Aplosporella gossypii (Died.) Petr. & Syd. (1927)
- Aplosporella grandinea Ellis & Everh. (1902)
- Aplosporella grewiae S. Ahmad (1969)
- Aplosporella heveae Saccas (1954)
- Aplosporella hibisci (Berk. ex Cooke) Petr. & Syd. (1926)
- Aplosporella hydrangeae Sousa da Câmara (1949)
- Aplosporella indica D.K. Agarwal, Chowdhry & A.K. Sarbhoy (1992)
- Aplosporella insueta Petr. (1940)
- Aplosporella ipomoeae S. Ahmad (1964)
- Aplosporella iranica Petr. (1949)
- Aplosporella jasmini Ellis & Everh. (1902)
- Aplosporella jasminina Moesz (1926)
- Aplosporella javeedii Jami, Gryzenh., Slippers & M.J. Wingf. (2013)
- Aplosporella jodinae Speg. (1912)
- Aplosporella juglandina Ellis & Barthol. (1899)
- Aplosporella juniperi (Kuntze) Petr. (1953)
- Aplosporella justiciae Henn. (1904)
- Aplosporella kochiae-prostratae Săvul. & Sandu (1933)
- Aplosporella lactucicola (Kellerm.) Petr. & Syd. (1926)
- Aplosporella lagerstroemiae Mhaiskar (1969)
- Aplosporella lantanae J.V. Kachroo (1966)
- Aplosporella laricina Syd. (1937)
- Aplosporella lathamii Dearn. (1926)
- Aplosporella leucaenicola S. Ahmad (1969)
- Aplosporella lilacis Petr. (1944)
- Aplosporella lilii (Gonz. Frag.) Petr. & Syd. (1926)
- Aplosporella linderae (Peck) Petr. (1953)
- Aplosporella linearis (Peck) Petr. (1927)
- Aplosporella liquidambaris (Dearn. & House) Petr. & Syd. (1927)
- Aplosporella lonicerae S. Ahmad (1971)
- Aplosporella lutea (Dearn. & House) Petr. & Syd. (1926)
- Aplosporella machaerii Henn. (1908)
- Aplosporella maclurae (Cooke) Petr. & Syd. (1927)
- Aplosporella macropycnidia Dou & Y. Zhang ter (2016)
- Aplosporella madablotae S. Ahmad (1962)
- Aplosporella mali (Westend.) Petr. & Syd. (1926)
- Aplosporella malloti S. Ahmad & Arshad (1972)
- Aplosporella malorum Sacc. (1916)
- Aplosporella marathwadensis Tilak & R. Rao (1964)
- Aplosporella melanconioides Sacc. (1919)
- Aplosporella meliae Petr. (1953)
- Aplosporella melianthi Urries (1941)
- Aplosporella melogrammata Cooke ex Grove (1937)
- Aplosporella memecyli Subhedar & V.G. Rao (1979)
- Aplosporella missouriensis Bubák (1906)
- Aplosporella moelleriana Sousa da Câmara (1929)
- Aplosporella mori (Berl.) Petr. & Syd. (1927)
- Aplosporella moringcola Subhedar, A. Pande & V.G. Rao (1995)
- Aplosporella murrayae S. Ahmad (1962)
- Aplosporella neilliae (Ellis & Everh.) Petr. (1953)
- Aplosporella neriicola Kalani (1961)
- Aplosporella nervisequa Alexandri (1932)
- Aplosporella nyctanthis R. Rao (1966)
- Aplosporella oleae M.E.A. Costa & Sousa da Câmara (1955)
- Aplosporella oleae-dioicae Subhedar & V.G. Rao (1979)
- Aplosporella opuntiae (Fairm.) Petr. & Syd. (1926)
- Aplosporella palmacea Gonz. Frag. & Cif. (1929)
- Aplosporella palmaceae Gonz. Frag. & Cif. (1927)
- Aplosporella palmicola Henn. (1905)
- Aplosporella pandanicola A.K. Roy (1964)
- Aplosporella papillata F.J.J. Van der Walt, Slippers & G.J. Marais (2014)
- Aplosporella parallela (Dearn. & House) Petr. & Syd. (1926)
- Aplosporella passiflorae A. Pande (1980)
- Aplosporella peckii (Sacc.) House (1916)
- Aplosporella pelargonii (Pat.) Maire (1937)
- Aplosporella pennsylvanica (Berk. & M.A. Curtis) Petr. & Syd. (1926)
- Aplosporella pentatropidis S. Ahmad (1962)
- Aplosporella peristrophes S. Ahmad & Arshad (1972)
- Aplosporella phyllanthina Syd. (1937)
- Aplosporella pini House (1920)
- Aplosporella pistaciarum Petr. (1953)
- Aplosporella platani (Peck) Petr. (1936)
- Aplosporella plumeriae V.G. Rao (1963)
- Aplosporella populi (Ellis & Barthol.) Petr. & Syd. (1926)
- Aplosporella prinsepiae Tilak (1968)
- Aplosporella propullulans (Schwein.) Petr. & Syd. (1926)
- Aplosporella prosopidina Petr. (1954)
- Aplosporella prosopidincola S. Ahmad (1954)
- Aplosporella prosopidis (Dearn. & Barthol.) Petr. & Syd. (1927)
- Aplosporella pruni McAlpine (1902)
- Aplosporella prunicola Damm & Crous (2007)
- Aplosporella psidii (Chona & Munjal) D.K. Agarwal, Chowdhry & A.K. Sarbhoy (1992)
- Aplosporella puncta (Cooke & Ellis) Petr. (1953)
- Aplosporella quisqualidis S. Ahmad (1962)
- Aplosporella rhizophila Shear (1902)
- Aplosporella rhoina Dearn. & Barthol. (1924)
- Aplosporella ribicola (Cooke & Ellis) Petr. & Syd. (1927)
- Aplosporella robiniae (Ellis & Barthol.) Petr. & Syd. (1926)
- Aplosporella rosae Subhedar & V.G. Rao (1978)
- Aplosporella rosarum (Cooke & Ellis) Petr. (1926)
- Aplosporella rubicola Maire (1907)
- Aplosporella ruborum (Ellis) Petr. (1926)
- Aplosporella rugosa Henn. (1904)
- Aplosporella rumicicola (Sacc.) Petr. & Syd. (1926)
- Aplosporella ruscigena Bubák (1906)
- Aplosporella ruthenica Petr. (1925)
- Aplosporella sacchari Sousa da Câmara (1929)
- Aplosporella salicicola (Pass.) Petr. & Syd. (1927)
- Aplosporella salmaliae Tilak & R. Rao (1964)
- Aplosporella sambuci (Peck) Petr. (1926)
- Aplosporella sambucina Ellis & Barthol. (1902)
- Aplosporella schreberae Mhaskar, A. Pande & V.G. Rao (1995)
- Aplosporella sesbaniae J.V. Kachroo (1966)
- Aplosporella sidae D.K. Agarwal, Chowdhry & A.K. Sarbhoy (1992)
- Aplosporella smilacis (Ellis & Everh.) Petr. & Syd. (1927)
- Aplosporella sophorae Crous & Thangavel (2016)
- Aplosporella squieriae (Clinton) Petr. (1953)
- Aplosporella stephanotidis Kalani (1963)
- Aplosporella subconfluens (Fairm.) Petr. & Syd. (1926)
- Aplosporella syriaca Petr. (1953)
- Aplosporella tabernaemontanae S. Ahmad (1962)
- Aplosporella tamaricis (Hollós) Moesz (1929)
- Aplosporella tecomae (Dearn.) Petr. & Syd. (1926)
- Aplosporella terricola Luke & Madhur. (1972)
- Aplosporella thailandica Ekanayaka, Dissanayaka, Q. Zhao & K.D. Hyde (2016)
- Aplosporella thalictri (Ellis & Fairm.) Petr. & Syd. (1926)
- Aplosporella thespesiae Cif. (1957)
- Aplosporella thevetiae (Chona & Munjal) D.K. Agarwal, Chowdhry & A.K. Sarbhoy (1992)
- Aplosporella thujae Petr. (1925)
- Aplosporella tiliacea (Peck) Petr. (1925)
- Aplosporella tylophorae Subhedar, A. Pande & V.G. Rao (1995)
- Aplosporella ulmea (Ellis & Barthol.) Petr. & Syd. (1926)
- Aplosporella vallaridis S. Ahmad (1962)
- Aplosporella valsispora Kirschst. (1939)
- Aplosporella vanderystii Bres. (1914)
- Aplosporella vernoniae S. Ahmad (1962)
- Aplosporella viburni (Ellis & Dearn.) Petr. (1926)
- Aplosporella violacea Massee (1901)
- Aplosporella vivanii Goid. (1937)
- Aplosporella wistariae Ellis & Barthol. (1902)
- Aplosporella wladicaucasica Tschern. (1929)
- Aplosporella woodfordiae Subhedar, A. Pande & V.G. Rao (1995)
- Aplosporella xanthii S. Ahmad (1971)
- Aplosporella xanthiicola Subhedar, A. Pande & V.G. Rao (1995)
- Aplosporella yalgorensis K.M. Taylor, P.A. Barber & T.I. Burgess (2009)
- Aplosporella ziziphina S. Ahmad (1962)
- Aplosporella ziziphi-sativae S. Ahmad (1971)
- Aplosporella zollikoferiae (Pat.) Maire (1937)
