= Tuart Forest National Park =

National park in Western Australia

- IUCN category II (national park)
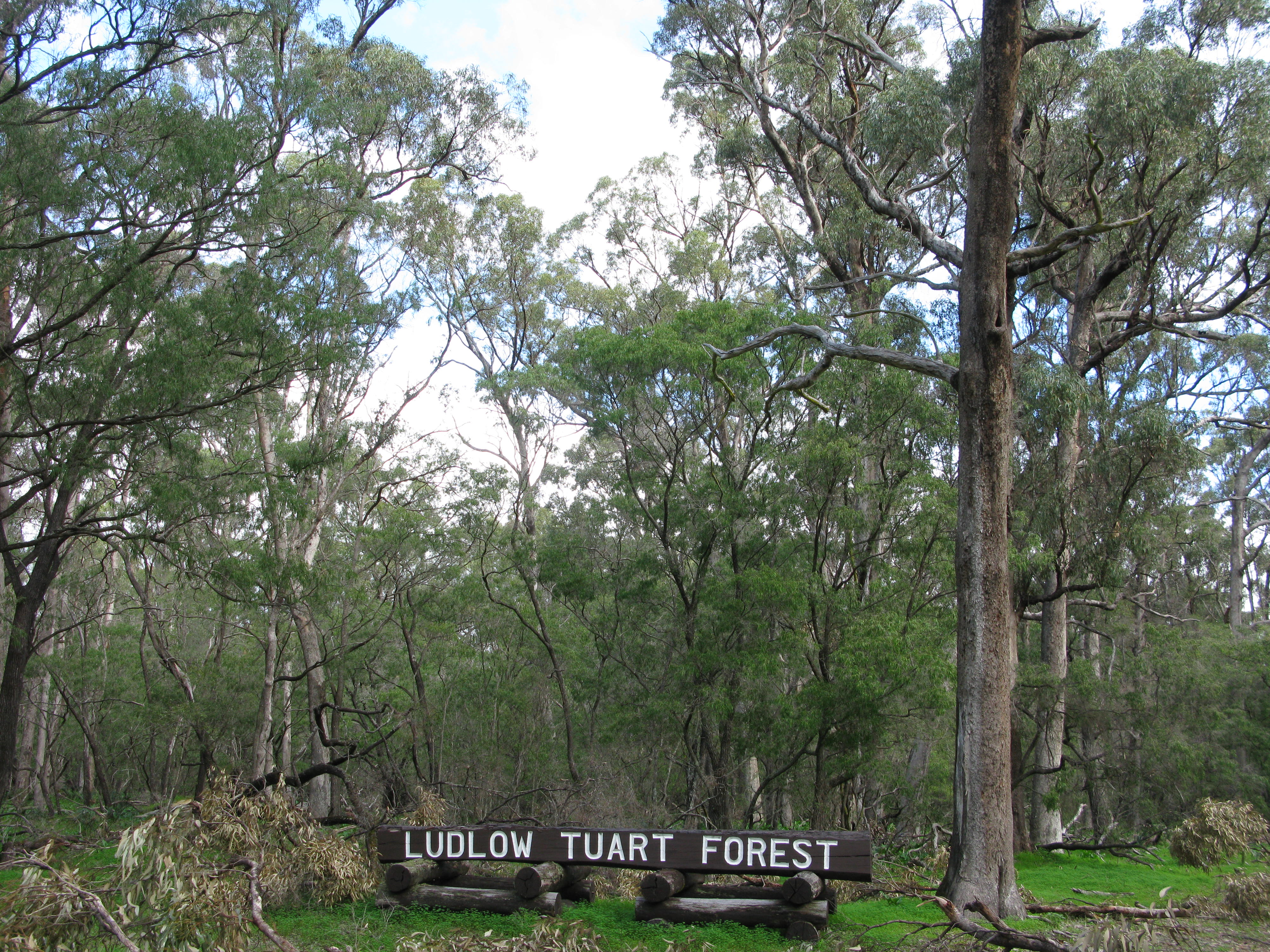

- Location within Western Australia
- Location: Western Australia
- Nearest city: Busselton
- Coordinates: 33°33′07″S 115°30′43″E
- Area: 20.49 km^{2} (7.91 sq mi)
- Established: 1987
- Governing body: Department of Parks and Wildlife
- Website: https://exploreparks.dbca.wa.gov.au/park/tuart-forest-national-park

Tuart Forest National Park is a national park in the South West region of Western Australia, 183 kilometres (114 mi) south of Perth. It contains the largest remaining section of pure tuart forest in the world. Traditionally the state forest associated with this stand of trees has been known as the Ludlow State Forest, named for Frederick Ludlow.

This narrow strip of tuart trees is situated near Ludlow between Capel and Busselton. The trees, species Eucalyptus gomphocephala, only grow on the coastal limestone that underlies the area and the park is home to the tallest and largest specimens of the trees remaining on the Swan Coastal Plain. The taller specimens found in the park are over 33 m (108 ft) tall and over 10 m (33 ft) in girth.

Tuart Drive, which is about 15 kilometres (9.3 mi) in length and was part of Bussell Highway before the opening of the Ludlow diversion in 1995, goes through the national park.

In addition to the pure tuart forest, the park is also home to the largest remaining wild population of the Western Ringtail Possum. Both the Western Ringtail Possums and the Brushtail Possums can be found along the Possum Spotlighting Trail within the park, which is designed to be walked at night, when both types of possums (being nocturnal) are most active. The trail is about 2 kilometres (1.2 mi) long and there are reflective markers installed along narrower parts of the trail. It is accessible via a carpark along Layman Road.

== See also ==
- List of protected areas of Western Australia
