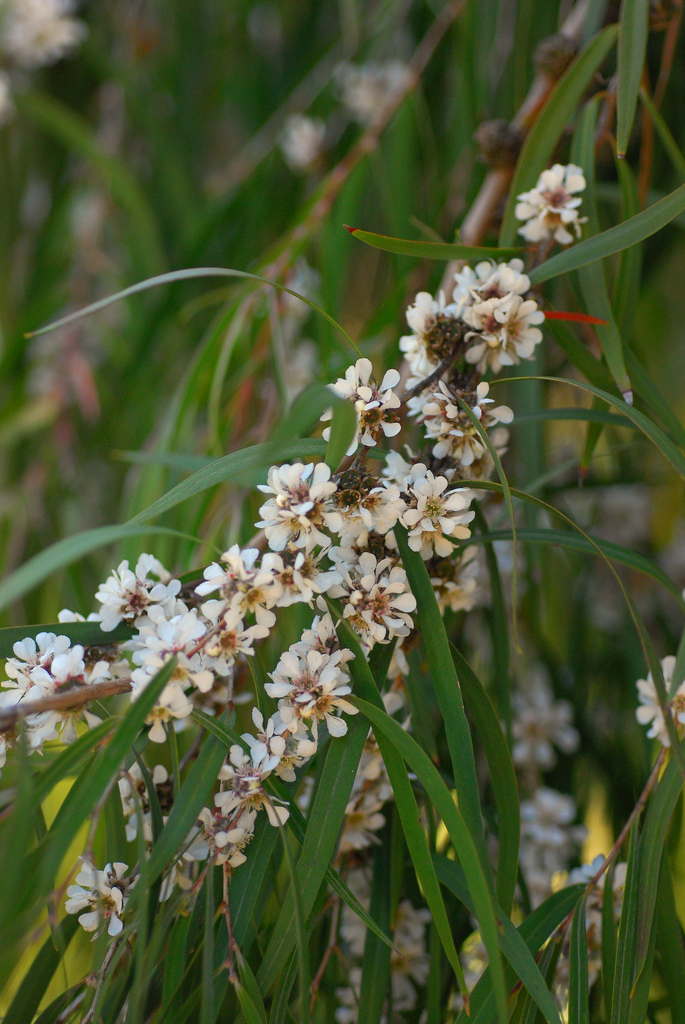
- Flowers

Conservation status
- Least Concern (IUCN 3.1)

Scientific classification
- Kingdom: Plantae
- Clade: Tracheophytes
- Clade: Angiosperms
- Clade: Eudicots
- Clade: Rosids
- Order: Myrtales
- Family: Myrtaceae
- Genus: Agonis
- Species: A. flexuosa

Binomial name
- Agonis flexuosa (Willd.) Sweet

Synonyms
- List: Billiotia flexuosa Otto & A.Dietr. orth. var.; Billottia flexuosa (Willd.) R.Br.; Billottia flexuosa (Willd.) G.Don isonym; Leptospermum flexuosum (Willd.) Spreng.; Leptospermum flexuosum (Willd.) Link isonym; Leptospermum glomeratum H.L.Wendl.; Leptospermum resiniferum Bertol.; Metrosideros flexuosa Willd.

= Agonis flexuosa =

Species of tree

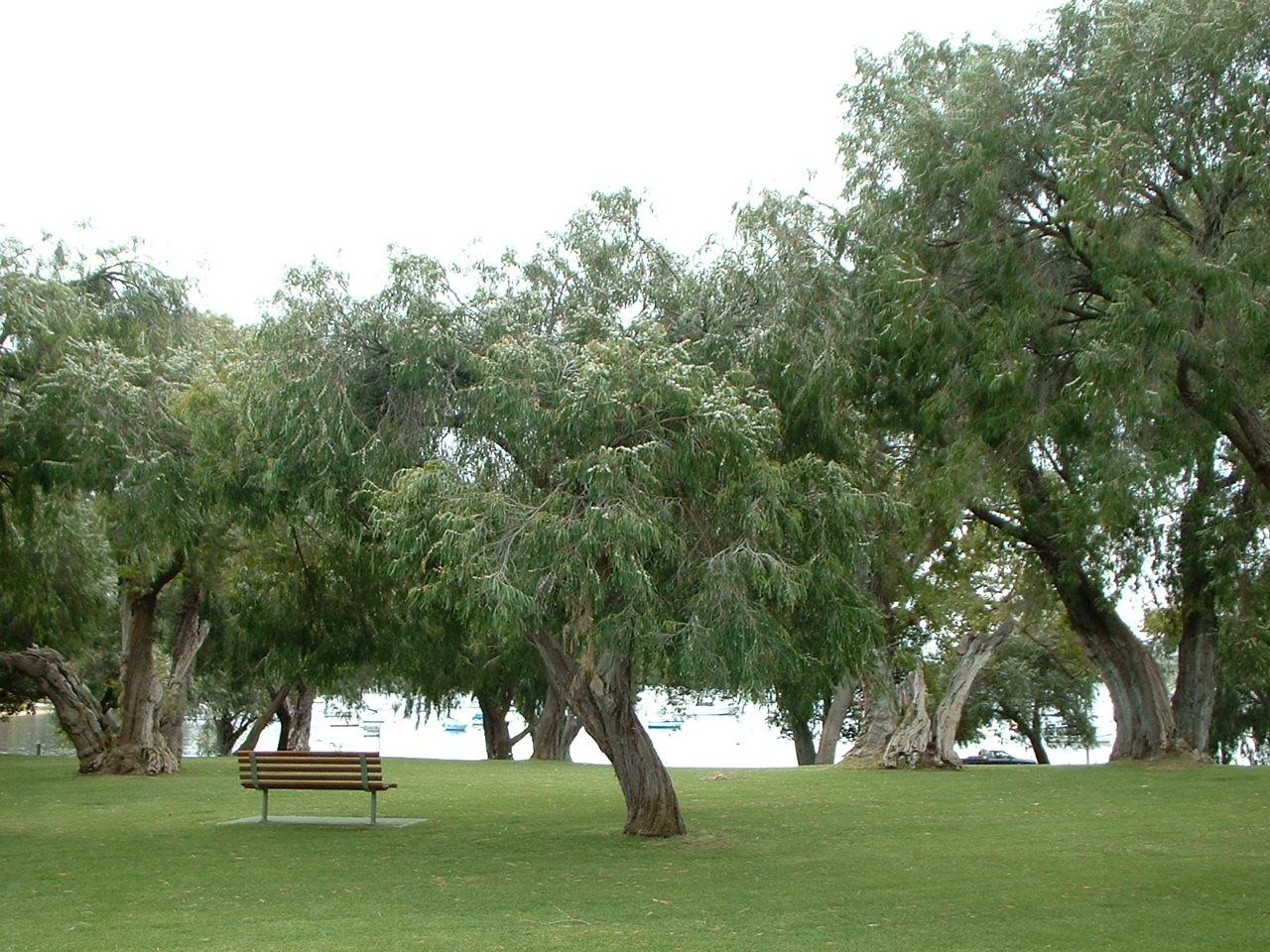
In Peppermint Grove parkland

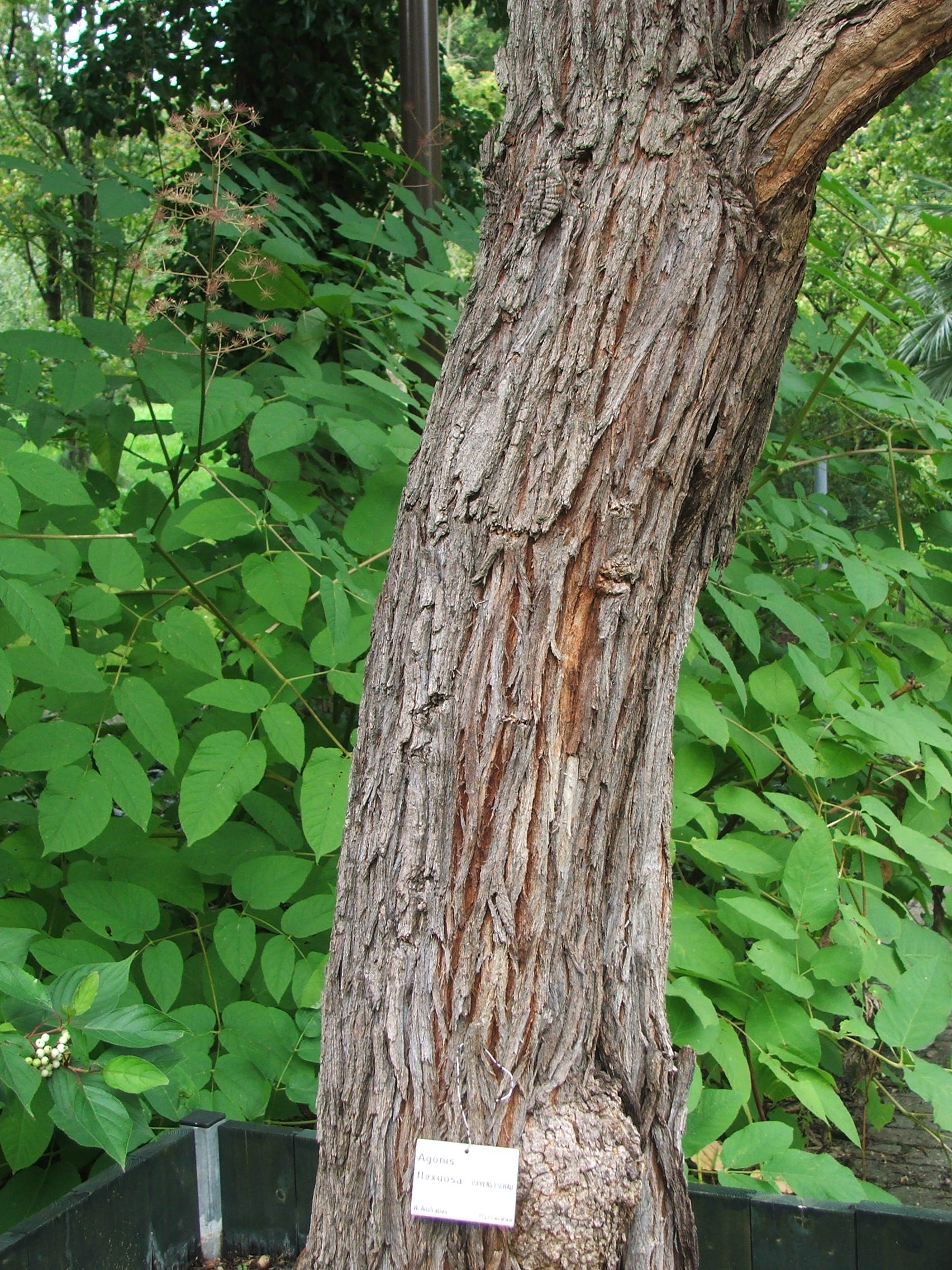
Bark

Agonis flexuosa, commonly known as peppermint, is a species of flowering plant in the family Myrtaceae and is endemic to the southwest of Western Australia. The Noongar peoples know the tree as wanil, wonnow, wonong or wannang. It is a tree or shrub with pendulous, very narrowly elliptic, narrowly elliptic or narrowly egg-shaped leaves, white flowers with 20 to 25 stamens opposite the sepals and broadly top-shaped to broadly cup-shaped capsules.

== Description ==
Agonis flexuosa is usually a tree that typically grows to a height of 10 m (33 ft), sometimes a wind-swept mallee or almost prostrate shrub. Its branchlets are often twisted or zig-zagged, and usually glabrous as they age. The leaves are very narrowly elliptic, narrowly elliptic or narrowly egg-shaped, 80–135 mm (3.1–5.3 in) long and 3.5–12 mm (0.14–0.47 in) wide and sessile or on a petiole up to 5 mm (0.20 in) long. The leaves sometimes have soft, silky hairs when young, but become glabrous as they age, and have a prominent mid-vein and usually two other veins. The flowers are arranged in clusters 10–15 mm (0.39–0.59 in) wide with broadly egg-shaped bracts and elliptic bracteoles 1–2 mm (0.039–0.079 in) long. The floral tube is 1.5–2 mm (0.059–0.079 in) long and the sepals are 1–2 mm (0.039–0.079 in) long with silky, greyish hairs. The petals are white, spatula-shaped, 3–6 mm (0.12–0.24 in) long and there are 20 to 25 stamens with 3 to 5, sometimes up to 7 opposite the sepals, but none opposite the petals. The filaments are 1–1.5 mm (0.039–0.059 in) long and the style 1–2.5 mm (0.039–0.098 in) long. Flowering occurs from July to December, and the capsule is broadly top-shaped to broadly cup-shaped, 2.5–4 mm (0.098–0.157 in) long, in clusters 6–10 mm (0.24–0.39 in) wide.

== Taxonomy ==
This species was first formally described in 1809 by Carl Ludwig Willdenow who gave it the name Metrosideros flexuosa in his Enumeratio Plantarum Horti Regii Botanici Berolinensis. In 1830, Robert Sweet transferred the species to Agonis in his Hortus Britannicus.

The genus name Agonis comes from the Greek agon meaning 'a gathering' or 'collection', probably referring to the flower heads and the specific epithet (flexuosa) is Latin for 'zig-zag', referring to the zig-zag branches.

In 1844, Johannes Conrad Schauer describes two varieties of A. flexuosa and the names are accepted by the Australian Plant Census:

- Agonis flexuosa var. flexuosa is a tree up to 10 m (33 ft) high or a wind-pruned shrub, the branches sometimes zig-zagged, with leaves very narrowly elliptic, narrowly elliptic or narrowly egg-shaped, 80–135 mm (3.1–5.3 in) long and more or less flat and not twisted or wavy, and only the mid-vein prominent, the petals 3–6 mm (0.12–0.24 in) long, usually 4 or 5 stamens opposite each petal, and the capsules usually 2.5–3.5 mm (0.098–0.138 in) wide. This variety mostly flowers from September to December.
- Agonis flexuosa var. latifolia (previously known as Billotia flexuosa var. latifolia Otto & A.Dietr.) is a shrub or small tree tup to 4 m (13 ft) high, the branches commonly zig-zagged, with leaves usually narrowly egg-shaped, 18–45 mm (0.71–1.77 in) long and often twisted, the mid-vein and two longitudinal veins prominent, the petals 3–4 mm (0.12–0.16 in) long, with 3 or 4 stamens opposite each petal, and the capsules 3–4 mm (0.12–0.16 in) wide. This variety mainly flowers from September to November.

== Distribution and habitat ==
Agonis flexuosa var. flexuosa occurs in a range of habitats from coastal heath to woodland or forest and in a range of soils, in the Esperance Plains, Geraldton Sandplains, Jarrah Forest, Swan Coastal Plain and Warren bioregions of south-western Western Australia, and var. latifolia mainly grows in sandy soil in heath, shrubland or woodland between Walpole and Cheyne Beach in the Esperance Plains, Jarrah Forest and Warren bioregions, with a record from the Stirling Range.

== Uses ==
=== Use in horticulture ===
Horticultural variants are probably derived from the widespread population, growing as shrubs or trees and perhaps being flowerless. Some commercially produced cultivars include Agonis ‘Belbra Gold’ and Agonis ‘Fairy Foliage’.

=== Aboriginal use ===
The Noongar peoples used the plant leaves as an antiseptic; sapling trunks were used as spear shafts and digging sticks.
