= Ludlow, Western Australia =

Place in Western Australia

Ludlow
- Town
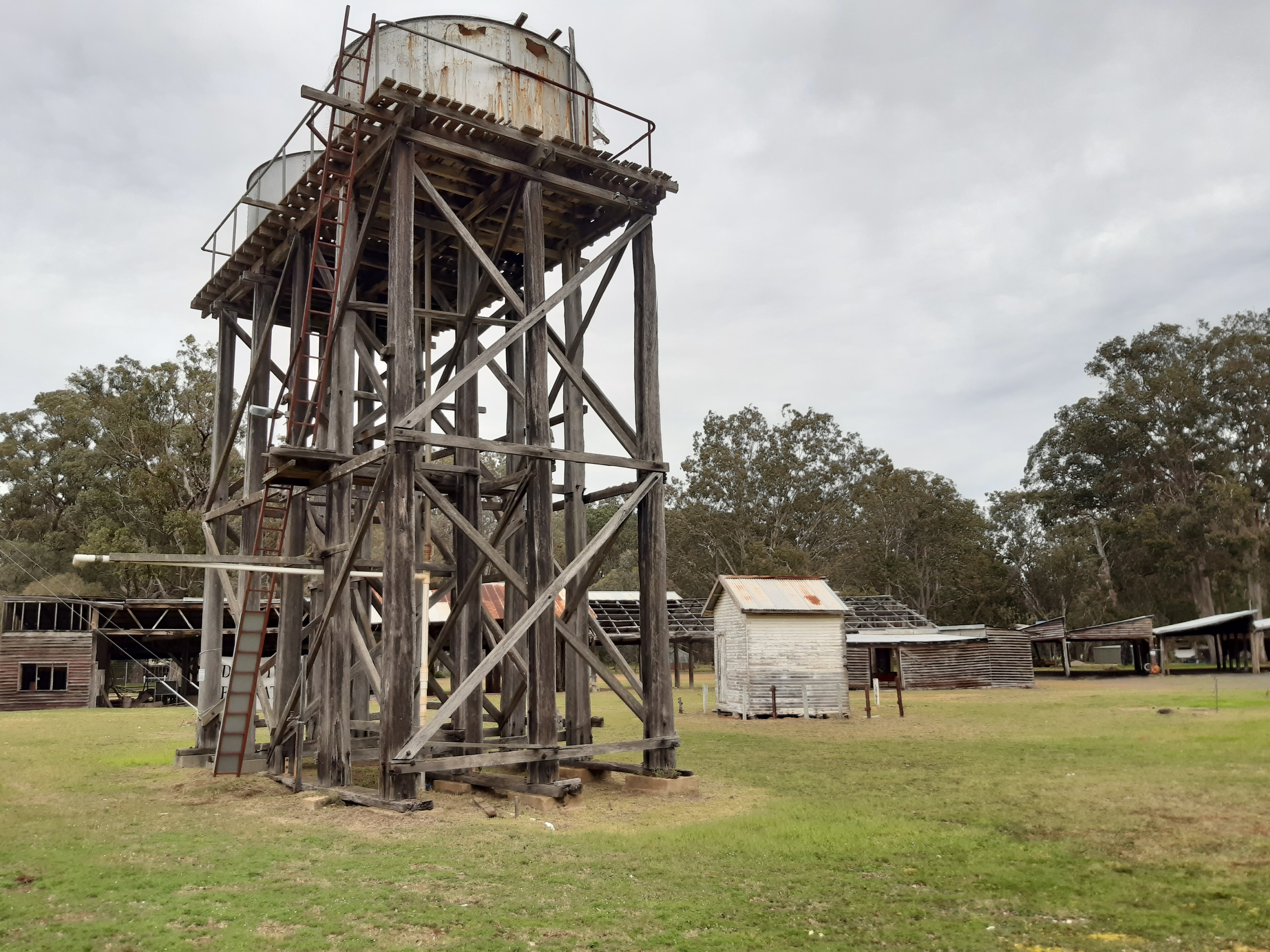
- The historic Ludlow Forestry Mill and Settlement

- Interactive map of Ludlow
- Coordinates: 33°36′S 115°28′E
- Country: Australia
- State: Western Australia
- LGA: City of Busselton; Shire of Capel
- Location: 207 km (129 mi) from Perth; 15 km (9.3 mi) from Busselton; 11 km (6.8 mi) from Capel

Government
  - State electorate: Vasse
  - Federal division: Forrest

Area
  - Total: 49.2 km^{2} (19.0 sq mi)

Population
  - Total: 132 (SAL 2021)
- Time zone: UTC+8 (AWST)
- Postcode: 6280

Designations

Western Australia Heritage Register
- Official name: Ludlow Forestry Mill and Settlement
- Designated: 22 August 2006
- Reference no.: 15834

Ludlow is a locality in the South West region of Western Australia near the Tuart Forest National Park. It is in the local government areas of the City of Busselton and the Shire of Capel. At the 2021 census, the area had a population of 132.

== History ==
The Wardandi people inhabited the Ludlow area before European settlement. A school, Ludlow School (originally known as Ludlow Bridge School), existed in the area as early as 1866, but initially operated intermittently due to low patronage.

A pine plantation was first set up at Ludlow in 1909, with a nursery being developed in 1916. After the passage of the Forestry Act (1918), Conservator of Forests Charles Lane Poole set up a small forestry settlement in the area, along with the Ludlow Forestry School, the first such institution in Western Australia, which operated from 1921 to 1927. During the 1920s the area was also part of the Group Settlement Scheme for dairy production, and a general store and district office were built, as well as a new school building for children in the Ludlow area.

The first thinnings were harvested from the pine plantation in 1936/37 and by the early 1940s timber from Ludlow was being used to make cases and crates for food storage during World War II. During the post-war housing boom, Ludlow was used to supply plywood for the housing industry. European immigrants ("New Australians") began working in the Ludlow pine plantation and by the mid-1950s a sawmill and planer mill, along with workers' cottages that formed the main Ludlow forestry settlement, had been constructed. The settlement was divided by the Ludlow River; the north side, where most of the cottages were built, is in the area of the Shire of Capel.

By the early 1970s the sawmill had been closed and plantings were discontinued in the pine plantation in 1973; the planer mill was closed a few years later. The Tuart Forest National Park was declared in the area in 1987 and The Ludlow Forestry Mill and Settlement was registered on the State Register of Heritage Places in 2006. In 2016 the Department of Parks and Wildlife, which rented out the cottages, evicted the occupants, citing maintenance issues, age, and housing conditions; the cottages have since been abandoned. In 2021, the volunteer Ludlow Tuart Forest Restoration Group released a masterplan for a future forest education, research and tourist centre at the Ludlow forestry settlement.
