= George Layman =

Australian politician

George Layman was born at Wonnerup House in 1838 and resided there until his death on 13 December 1921.

His father, George Layman, was fatally speared by a local Wardandi Noongar warrior referred to as Goewar, also spelt as Gayware, Gaywal or Geewar in 1841. Elijah Dawson, Captain John Molloy and two Bussell brothers along with troopers retaliated against the local tribe and massacred many Aboriginal people including women and children. George Layman Jnr, growing up at Wonnerup, was influenced by the Noongar peoples and learnt their language, along with amassing a collection of artefacts from all over Western Australia.

He was involved in whaling in the area.

Layman was a member of the Western Australian Legislative Council from 1884 until 1888. His son, Charles Layman, was also a member of parliament.
