= Wonnerup House =

Heritage-listed farm precinct in Wonnerup, Western Australia

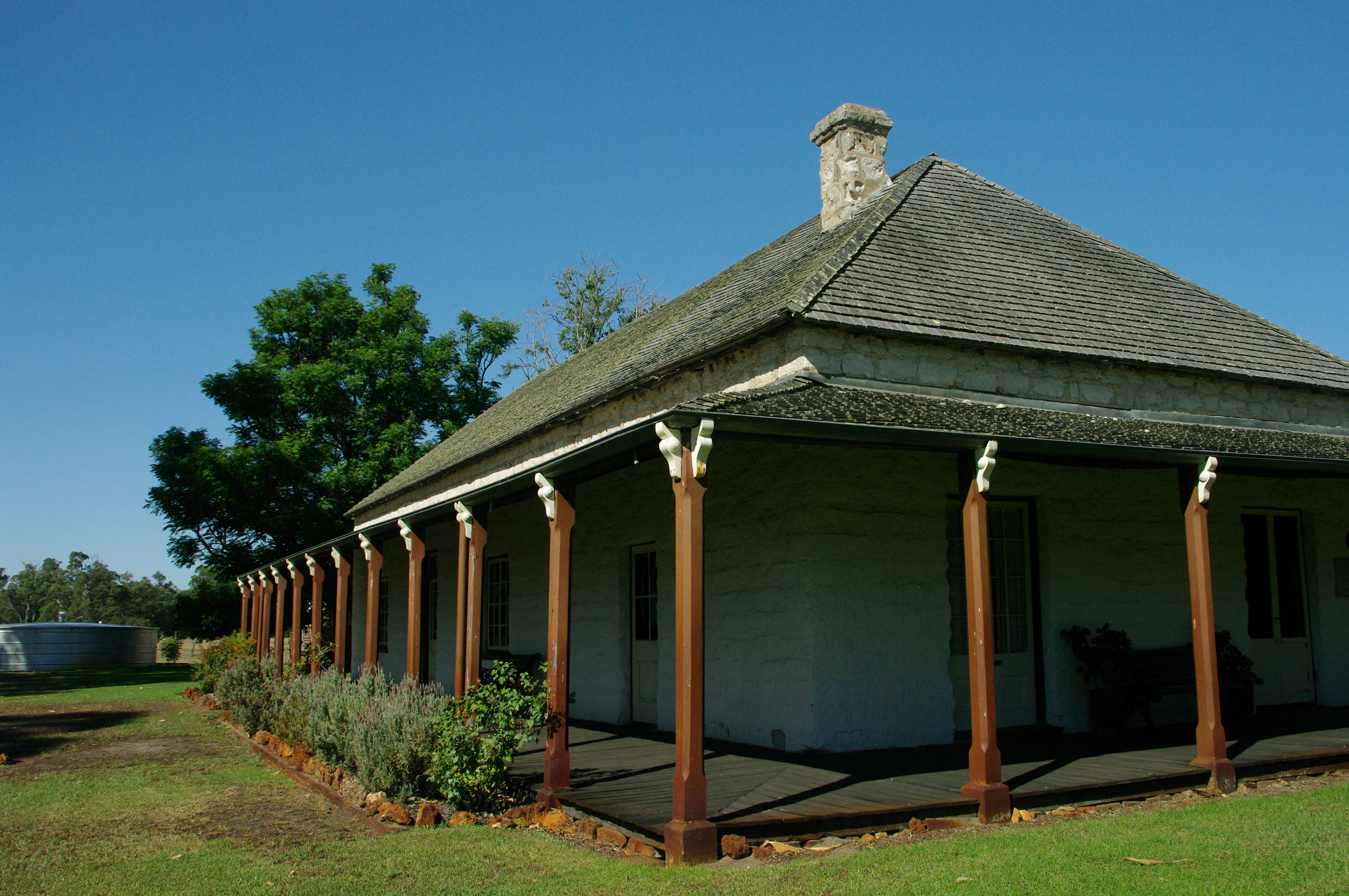
- Wonnerup House

- Location within Western Australia

General information
- Type: Farm
- Location: Wonnerup, Western Australia
- Coordinates: 33.6276°S 115.4328°E

Western Australia Heritage Register
- Designated: 13 August 2014
- Reference no.: 424

Wonnerup House is a heritage-listed farm precinct in Wonnerup, Western Australia. The current house was built in 1859 by George Layman Jr, one year after the original house built in 1837 by his father, George Layman Sr, was destroyed by fire. The dairy and kitchen survived the fire because they were separate from the house. Stables and a blacksmith workshop were later additions to the farm. In the 1870s, when the lack of a school in Wonnerup was an issue for the local residents, Layman Jr donated land near Wonnerup House for a school, which was built in 1873. In 1885 a teacher's house was constructed. The precinct was purchased by the National Trust of Australia in 1971 and opened to the public in 1973.

The name Wonnerup comes from the Noongar term wanna describing a woman's digging stick, the suffix -up meaning 'place of'.

== Background ==
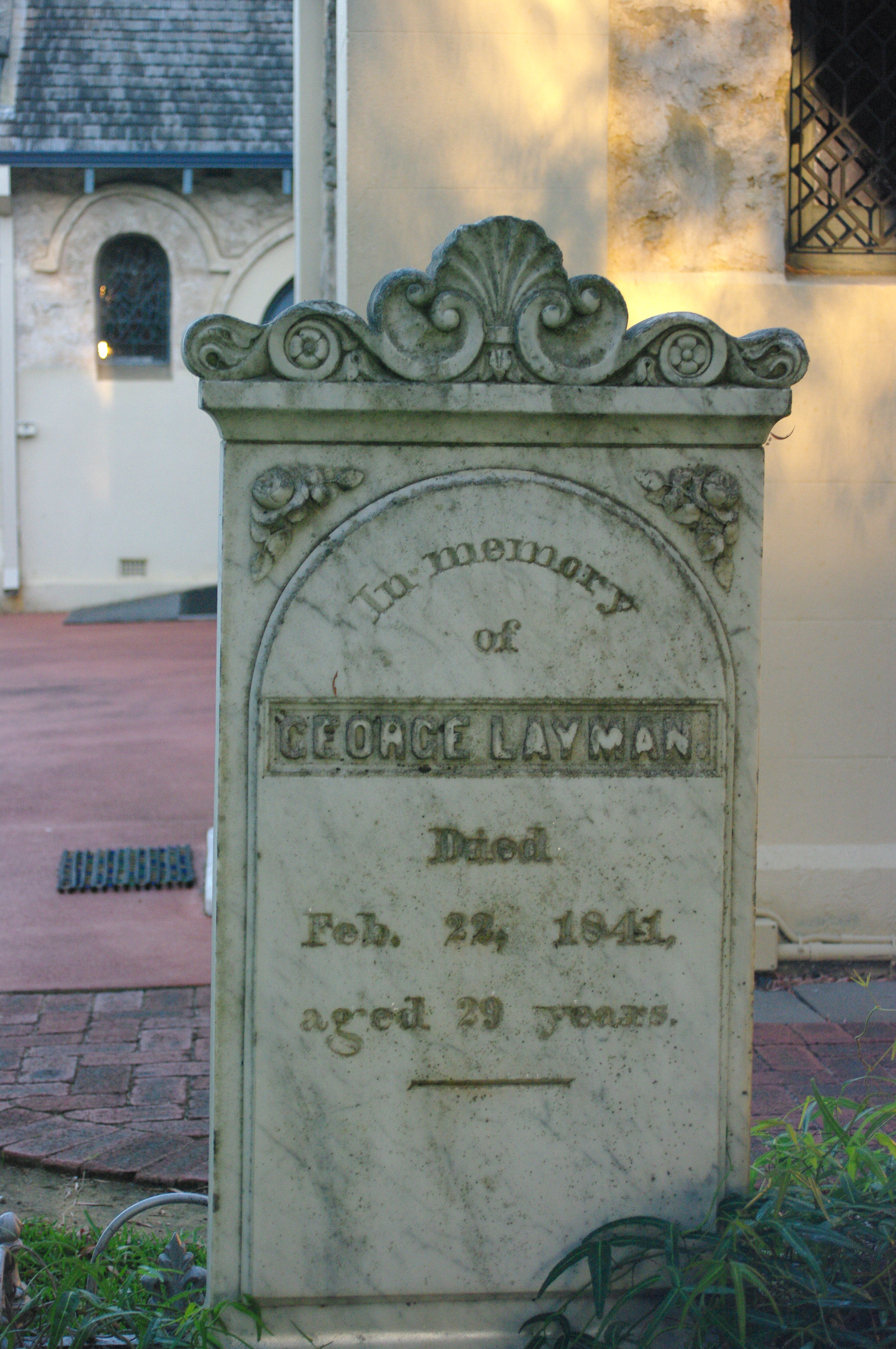
Grave of George Layman Sr in St Mary's Anglican Church, Busselton, Western Australia

In 1827 Layman Sr, then 17 years old, immigrated to Australia from England and settled in Van Diemen's Land, Tasmania, with his brother Charles. Van Diemen's Land was initially a penal colony, but became a colony in its own right in 1824. In 1829, Layman Sr was attacked and robbed of all his money by escaped convicts, and decided to work his passage to the new Swan River Colony, arriving in October 1829. He married Mary Ann Bayliss in Perth in 1832; the couple established a homestead in Augusta. However, Augusta failed as a settlement, and many of the settlers chose to exchange their grants there for land in the Busselton region.

George and Mary Layman moved to Busselton in 1834 with their two young daughters, Harriet and Mary. Their son George Layman Jr was born in 1837, the same year that Layman Sr built a homestead on his land. This cottage was followed by a separate dairy and kitchen complete with cellar and large ovens. The Laymans had two other children, Charles in 1838 and Catherine (Kate) in 1841.

Relations between the European settlers and the indigenous Wardandi people were strained to the point of violence, resulting in several Aboriginal deaths. In February 1841, after a long day of work at the Layman property, Layman Sr was speared to death by Wardandi elder Gaywal. According to several witnesses including Robert Heppingstone, Layman Sr had gotten involved in an argument between Gaywal and another Wardandi tribesman Milligan over the stealing of Milligan's allocation of damper by Gaywal. Layman Sr pulled Gaywal's beard, which was considered a grave insult. A manhunt for Layman Sr's killer went on for several weeks, involving much bloodshed. While on the hunt, John Molloy, the Bussell brothers, and British troops killed an unknown number of Aboriginal persons. One source has described these events, which later became known as the Wonnerup massacre; however, no government records were written to describe the event. (Note: There are no official records of the massacre and sources suggest anywhere from 5 to 300 were killed. Warren Burt Kimberly reported in 1897: "the black men were killed by the dozens and their corpses lined the route of march", adding that remains "are still to be found." However, there is no estimate of, nor actual number given, in this source. Other, more recent sources quote a number of 250 to 300, though none of these appear to be supported anywhere other than oral history of unknown origin. A newspaper report at the time states that five were killed.) The posse eventually shot Gaywal and captured his three sons, two of whom were imprisoned on Rottnest Island.

A year after Layman Sr's death, Mary married Robert Heppingstone. They had two children, Arthur and Robert. Heppingstone owned a whaling operation that operated from Castle Rock, in addition to running the Wonnerup farm. On 6 September 1858, the whaling boat Champion with Heppingstone at the tiller was ferrying goods in rough seas from the Castle Bay whaling station to a boat offshore. While turning, it was hit by a wave that threw Heppingstone across the boat, and before he could recover, a second wave hit, upending the boat. Three crewmen were rescued, but Heppingstone drowned in the accident.

Earlier that same year, in February 1858, the Layman cottage burned to the ground; only the dairy and kitchen in the separate building escaped the flames.

At this stage, 20-year-old Layman Jr took over the management of the farm and the whaling operation. In July 1859 Layman Jr married Amelia Harriet Curtis and started building a new house, the current Wonnerup House, for his family using local limestone and timbers. The wooden roof shingles were later covered with corrugated iron.

== House ==
The house was built in stages, with four rooms and a hall at the outset and a kitchen and scullery added around 1862. In 1925 a bathroom and toilet were introduced. Expansion of the kitchen and dairy which survived the fire was completed in 1872. In the 1880s and 1890s, Wonnerup House was one of the district's most lucrative dairy farms.

The main gates were cast-iron-mounted onto limestone columns. These gates were erected to the memory of Layman Sr. A tablet set into the columns reads: "George Layman came to Western Australia in 1829 aged 18 years, Augusta 1830, Wonnerup 1834, speared by natives 1841".

== Land ==
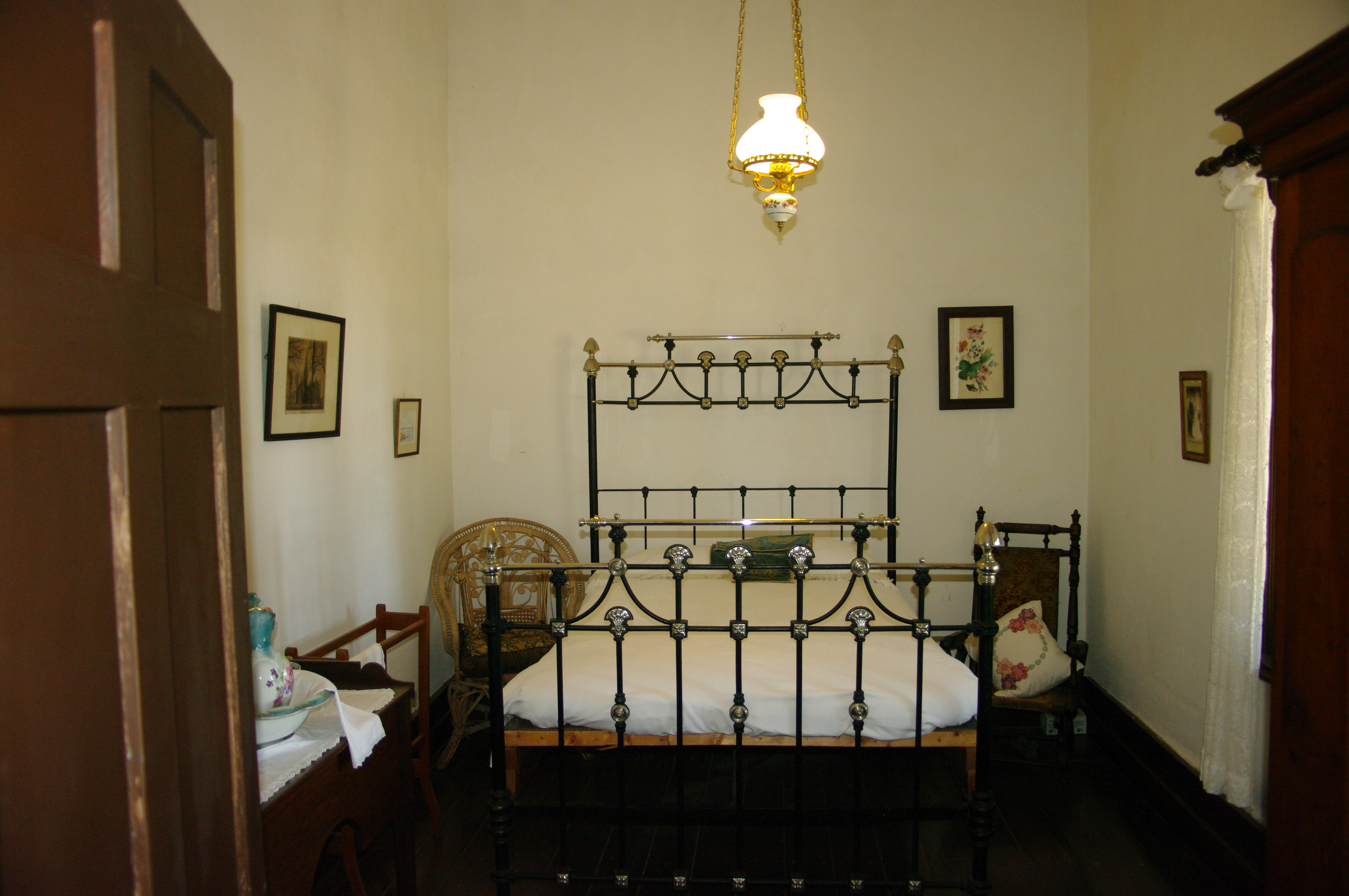
One of the bedrooms with furniture that belonged to the Layman family

The land on which Wonnerup House stands was originally surveyed as Sussex lot 4, which Layman Sr purchased after he received title to Sussex lot 3, some 200 hectares (500 acres). Over time, the Layman family purchased adjoining acreage; at its peak, the farm covered an area of over 1,000 hectares (2,500 acres). Layman Jr handed over management of the farm to his youngest son, James, in the 1900s. After James' death in 1911, the farm was passed back to his parents and four unmarried sisters to manage. Eventually a nephew took over the management, and in 1962, with the death of the last Layman sister, the farm was sold and subdivided, with the parcel of land upon which Wonnerup House and associated buildings are located being acquired by the National Trust of Australia in 1971. This sale included the furniture, personal effects and Aboriginal artifacts collected by the Layman family since 1829. In 1973 the National Trust opened Wonnerup House to the public and the Western Australian Government then gave the old school house and teacher's residence site to the National Trust.

=== School and teacher's house ===
Over the road are the school (1873) and teacher's house (1885) built on land given to the government by Layman Jr.

== See also ==
- Ballaarat tramline

== Sources ==
- Kimberly, Warren Bert, ed. (1897). History of West Australia: A Narrative of her Past together with Biographies of her Leading Men. Melbourne: F. W. Niven. OCLC 36942961. Wikidata Q5867187.
