= List of State Register of Heritage Places in the City of Busselton =

The State Register of Heritage Places is maintained by the Heritage Council of Western Australia. As of 2026, 229 places are heritage-listed in the City of Busselton, of which 31 are on the State Register of Heritage Places.

== List ==
The Western Australian State Register of Heritage Places, as of 2026, lists the following 31 state registered places within the City of Busselton:

Place name	Place #	Street number	Street name	Suburb or town	Co-ordinates	Notes & former names	Photo
Bovell's Cottage	385	13	Adelaide Street	Busselton	33.647756°S 115.342738°E		
Villa Carlotta	386	110	Adelaide Street	Busselton	33.646078°S 115.354027°E	St Joseph's Convent and School (former), Ithaca	
Prospect Villa	389	4 & 4A	Pries Avenue	Busselton	33.65273°S 115.34434°E		
Sandilands	394		Layman Road, north-east of intersection with Ford Road	Geographe	33.647068°S 115.361435°E		
Bond Store & Resident Magistrate's Office (former), Busselton	395	22	Kent Street	West Busselton	33.651019°S 115.340864°E	Bond Store & Custom Officer's Residence, The Gulch, Police Residence	
Busselton Court House and Police Complex	401	4	Queen Street	Busselton	33.647137°S 115.343224°E	Old Court House & Police Complex Precinct	
St Mary's Anglican Church and Graveyard	402	39	Peel Terrace	Busselton	33.65276°S 115.345687°E	Hall site, includes: Church, Graveyard, Rectory	
Weld Hall Theatre	404	13	Queen Street	Busselton	33.647555°S 115.344133°E	Weld Repertory Theatre, Weld Institute, Weld Mechanics' Institute	
Office of the Department of Agriculture	405	7	Queen Street	Busselton	33.646923°S 115.343945°E	Agricultural Bank of Western Australia, Agriculture Western Australia, ArtGeo Gallery	
Old Busselton Cemetery	406		Stanley Street, corner Adelaide Street & Marine Tce	Busselton	33.646923°S 115.343945°E	Burial Ground, Pioneer Cemetery, Marine Terrace Cemetery	
Old Vasse Primary School Precinct	418	21	Kaloorup Road	Vasse	33.679283°S 115.249772°E	Old Vasse School	
Chapman's Mill (Inlet Park farm)	421	71	Tall Tree Crescent	Reinscourt	33.646797°S 115.414272°E		
Busselton Jetty	423	2	Queen Street	Busselton	33.6369°S 115.3401°E		
Wonnerup Precinct	424	935 & 936	Layman Road	Wonnerup	33.6276°S 115.4328°E	Wonnerup House and Grounds	
Wonnerup School & Teacher's House	425	936	Layman Road	Wonnerup	33.6276°S 115.4328°E	Old Wonnerup School & Teacher's House	
Abbey Farm	426	57	Abbeys Farm Road	Yallingup	33.717587°S 115.038137°E		
Caves House	428		Yallingup Beach Road	Yallingup	33.64542°S 115.030935°E	Caves House Yallingup, Yallingup Caves Accommodation House	
Millbrook Farm	429		Millbrook Road	Yallingup	33.67712°S 115.047091°E	Millbrook Mill & Limekiln	
Cape Naturaliste Lighthouse and Quarters	2914		Cape Naturaliste Road	Cape Naturaliste	33.537333°S 115.018694°E		
St Davitt's	2936	27	Georgette Street	Busselton	33.647019°S 115.356146°E	Early Cammilleri Residence	
Slab Cottage Group, Quindalup	3478	1087	Caves Road	Busselton	33.635634°S 115.146318°E	Old Quindalup Post Office (former), Harwood's Cottage Cafe, Harwoods Beach Station (former), Inlet Villa, Slab Cottage, Harwood's Cafe & Quindalup Post Office	
Old Butter Factory	3568	76	Peel Terrace	Busselton	33.652703°S 115.34986°E	Old Butter Factory / Museum, Busselton Butter Factory (former)	
Lady Campion Hostel (former)	5299	27	Adelaide Street	Busselton	33.647488°S 115.34445°E		
Old Busselton Post Office Site & Post Box ^{†}	5304	20	Queen Street	Busselton	33.648093°S 115.343618°E		
Ballarat Tramline Plaque and Wheel (Locomotive)	5333		Ruabon Road	Wonnerup	33.626984°S 115.4327071°E		
Cattle Chosen	5337	12	Drovers Road	Bovell	33.673764°S 115.358564°E		
Westbrook Homestead	5372	24	Westbrook Glen	Vasse	33.692376°S 115.236724°E		
Ludlow Forestry Mill and Settlement	15834		Corner Ludlow Road North & Tuart Drive	Ludlow	33.600000°S 115.466667°E	Ludlow Forestry Settlement	
Site of Ballarat Bridge, Vasse Floodgates & Wonnerup Floodgates ^{†}	16727		Layman Road	Wonnerup	33.6135°S 115.425834°E	Wonnerup Wetlands	
Millbrook Water Mill	18179		Millbrook Road	Yallingup	33.67763°S 115.046348°E		
Red Post Boxes Group	25501			Kalgoorlie, Busselton, Bassendean	33.647992°S 115.343818°E		

- ^{†} Denotes structure or building has been demolished
