= St Mary's Anglican Church, Busselton =

Church in Western Australia

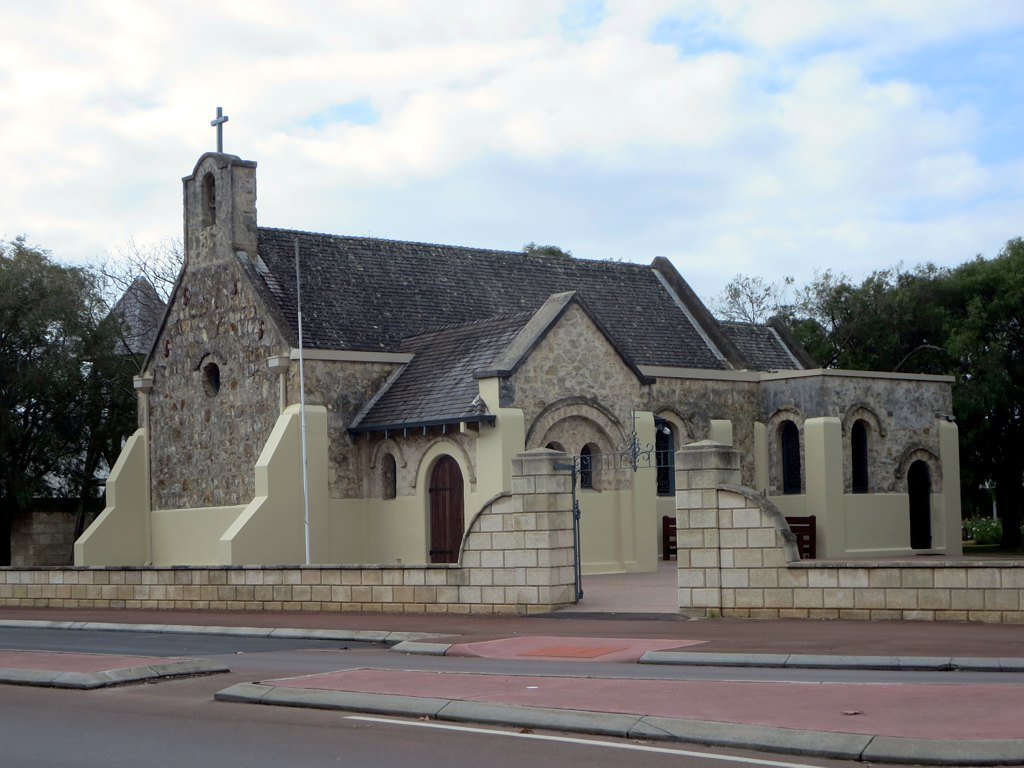
- The church in 2015
- St Mary's Anglican Church, Busselton
- 33°39′10″S 115°20′44″E
- Location: Busselton, Western Australia
- Address: 43 Peel Terrace, Busselton WA 6280
- Country: Australia
- Denomination: Anglican Church of Australia
- Previous denomination: Church of England
- Website: St Mary's Anglican Church Busselton / Anglican Parish of Busselton

History
- Status: Church
- Founded: 4 March 1844
- Dedication: Saint Mary
- Consecrated: 2 November 1848

Architecture
- Functional status: Active
- Architect: F. Brabazon Forsayth
- Style: Old Colonial Norman Revival / Victorian Romanesque
- Years built: 1844–48
- Construction cost: £300

Specifications
- Materials: Stone, shingle

Administration
- Province: Western Australia
- Diocese: Bunbury
- Parish: Busselton

Western Australia Heritage Register
- Official name: St Mary's Anglican Church and Graveyard
- Type: State Registered Place
- Criteria: 11.1., 11.2., 11.4., 12.1., 12.2., 12.3, 12.4., 12.5.
- Designated: 7 February 1997
- Reference no.: 00402

St Mary's Anglican Church is a heritage-listed Anglican church in Peel Terrace, Busselton, Western Australia. It is possibly the oldest stone church in the state. Opened in 1845, and consecrated in 1848, it has been the subject of a number of additions, and has also been repaired or conserved on several occasions.

== History ==
=== Background ===
The Vasse district is located about 200 km (120 mi) south of Perth, the capital city of the State. Its first European residents were a group of families, including the Bussells and the Molloys, who moved there from Augusta, further to the south, in the 1830s.

The members of the Bussell family who settled in the district were headed by five brothers: John, Charles, Lenox, Vernon, and Alfred. Their father, William Marchant Bussell, who had died in 1820, had been curate at St Mary's Church in Portsea, England. John Bussell had been hoping to follow his father into the clergy, but had left England before he could be ordained.

The principal townsite of the Vasse district was established on the shores of Geographe Bay, and by 1835 had been officially named Busselton. By 1841, the increasing population of the area was felt to warrant the construction of a church.

=== Construction ===
Initial financing for a church construction project was provided almost exclusively by friends and relatives of the Bussell family in England, and especially cousins Elizabeth Capel Carter and Frances Bowker. However, there were also local subscriptions.

Both John Bussell and Capel Carter had wanted religion to be an important part of the Augusta settlement. Capel Carter had established a fund, "for the erection of a church and parsonage at Augusta ...". The Bussell family settlers later advised her that the church should be built instead at Busselton.

Ultimately, the fund raised a total of £280, twenty of which were donated by Queen Adelaide, consort of King William IV, via her godmother, Lady Elizabeth Capel, who was also one of the Court's ladies-in-waiting.

By October 1843, a sufficient amount had been raised to cover the erection of walls and a roof. It was therefore resolved to proceed with construction.

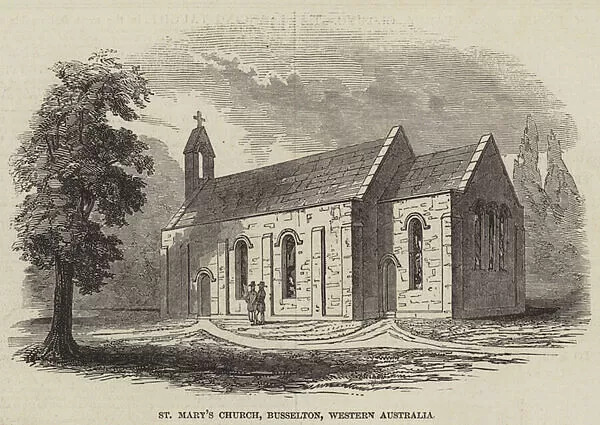
An engraving of the church published in The Illustrated London News, 21 February 1846

John Bussell, John Molloy and Henry Chapman were appointed as trustees. Bussell and John Wollaston are thought to have designed the building, to a modified early Norman architectural style, based on that of the chapel at Winchester College. F. Brabazon Forsayth prepared plans and estimates. On 4 March 1844, Frances Bussell laid the foundation stone, which reads:

"To the honour and praise of Almighty GOD,
The foundation stone of this Sanctuary,
to be erected with funds collected by friends of the Bussell family, (of Cattle Chosen, in this district),
for the use of the members of the Church of England,
was laid by Frances Louisa, relict of the William Marchant Bussell,
on the 4th day of March, 1844."

Various local settlers participated in the construction work, including by quarrying stone, and cutting and carting timber. All of the frames on which the arches were built were made by John Bussell, using timber he had donated after pit-sawing it himself, with the assistance of a sawyer named Balschin. The district carpenter, George Blechynden, donated several months of his own labour. The total construction costs were £300.

On 11 April 1845, Wollaston opened the church, which was named St Mary's after the church of that name in Portsea, England, where William Marchant Bussell had once been curate. On the same day, Wollaston performed the church's first baptism. At that time, the interior was still incomplete, and in particular had a temporary floor of beaten earth.

In February 1846, The Illustrated London News published an article about the church, which it described as follows:

"... a plain but substantial stone edifice, with circular headed windows and doorways; between the former and at the cornices are buttresses reaching to the line of springing. The Nave or body of the Church is forty feet long, and twenty feet wide; the Chancel fourteen feet long by twelve feet wide; the walls are sixteen feet to the line of roof; the exterior presenting a height of eighteen feet from the ground to the parapets, which extend all round."

Later that year, Wollaston wrote that "appropriate seats of a uniform pattern" had been made of jarrah wood, and that a stone font had been finished and would soon be installed at the west end of the nave, near the door. He had asked "friends at home" [i.e. in England] to "expend in [glazed] windows"; in the meantime, calico was being used in place of glass. Oxford contemporaries of John Bussell's later donated a set of windows sourced from a church in that town. By 1848, the church was generally said to be completed. It was consecrated by the first Bishop of Adelaide, Augustus Short, on 2 November 1848.

The church is claimed to be, or to be "possibly", the oldest stone church in Western Australia. A similar claim is made about St John's Anglican Church, Albany, which was built between 1841 and 1844, and then consecrated, also by Short, on 25 October 1848.

The history of the graveyard adjacent to the church extends back even further than that of the church itself. Burials at the church site include those of Georgiana Molloy in 1843 and Frances Bussell in 1845; the former was buried underneath what is now the church site, and the latter was interred in a vault beneath the chancel step. Many of the other early European settlers of Busselton were buried in the graveyard.

=== Later additions and works ===
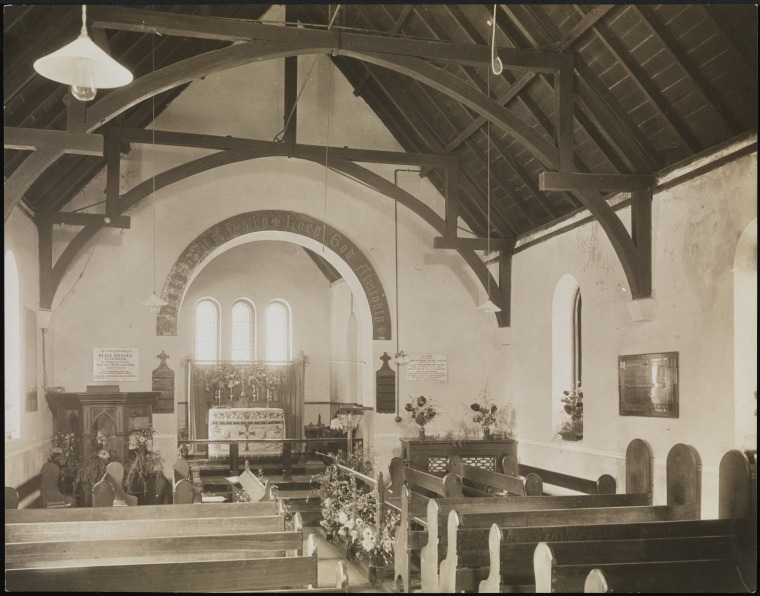
The interior of the nave and sanctuary in 1932

Since the church was consecrated, it has been much modified, repaired and renovated. A harmonium was installed in 1859. A bell tower was constructed in 1902. Four years later, on 14 October 1906, a new vestry, donated by Sir Winthrop Hackett, was consecrated as a replacement for an earlier vestry. A jarrah pulpit dedicated to the memory of John Molloy was installed in 1909. A brass honour roll commemorating members of the church who had died during World War I was dedicated on 6 December 1920. A porch in memory of John Bussell was dedicated on 14 September 1924.

In 1958, major repairs and renovations were carried out. The then rector, J.J. Tredwell, observed that the pit-sawn floor boards, which had been fixed in place 110 years earlier, had been "... found to be perfectly sound and were re-laid...", and that the original hand-hewn roofing timbers had also been "... found to be in perfect condition ...". Even the walls had required little work, other than "... the patching of deteriorated plaster ...".

During the 1970s, the bell tower was renovated, and many of the original windows were replaced with new stained glass items donated by descendants of early settler families. In 1972, aluminium tiles were laid in place of the original shingles. In the 1980s, the church was extensively renovated, at a total cost of $24,000. The renovations included the re-surfacing of interior walls, and the renewal of exterior walls. In April 1984, at a service on Palm Sunday, a memorial garden was blessed. It includes a wall of Donnybrook stone for memorial plaques, which had become necessary because of an increase in cremations.

By 1989, the church's aluminium tiles were leaking; that year, they were replaced with 10,400 new sheoak shingles costing $10,000. More recently, a number of headstones in the graveyard were replaced. Additionally, the church's interior walls were refinished at around the turn of the century in gyprock and plaster, to approximately window height.

The site of the church and graveyard was classified by the National Trust of Western Australia in 1961, and was added to the Register of the National Estate in 1982. It was included in the State Register of Heritage Places on 7 February 1997. The adjacent rectory and former church hall sites were added to the State Register as child places on 13 August 2014.

== Description ==
=== Location ===
The church is situated at the north-east corner of Queen Street and Peel Terrace, on the ocean side of the Vasse River, approximately seven kilometres (4 mi) upstream of the river's mouth. According to The Sydney Morning Herald, it has "the most superb location" of all of the important historical buildings in Busselton; its positioning, only about 100 m (300 ft) from the river, was influenced by the government's planning of the Busselton townsite.

Queen Street is the main street of Busselton, and its southern end, adjacent to the church, is the principal southern entrance to Busselton's city centre.

=== Church ===
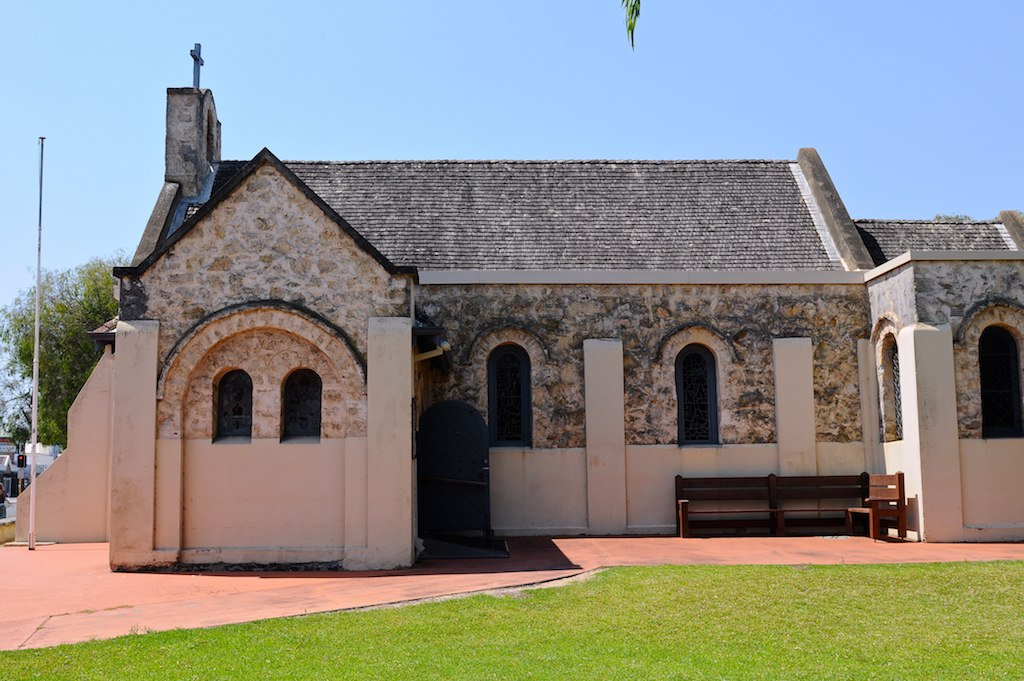
The church in 2010, with the porch and the 1980s-added piers, buttresses and rendering clearly visible

A single-storey building made of limestone, the church has timber floors and a shingle roof. Its architectural style has been described as "Old Colonial Norman Revival", and as "Victorian Romanesque ... in the Norman manner". Its nave is rectangular in shape, three bays long, and was constructed to an auditory plan; the bays are articulated with pilasters. Attached to the nave are a sanctuary, a vestry, an entrance porch (or narthex), and a bell tower.

All of the doors and most of the windows have semi-circular heads; Above all of the openings are hood moulds, most of which are semicircular. At the east of the sanctuary and vestry are two groupings of three lancet windows. The hood mould to the three sanctuary windows has a curved shape, and the one above the vestry windows is largely horizontal.

The porch has an arched entrance on its eastern side, and is fitted with four small stained glass windows depicting the dioceses to which the church has belonged: Canterbury, Calcutta, Sydney, Adelaide, Perth and Bunbury. In the southern wall of the vestry is a separate external entrance; an internal door and an arched window separate the vestry from the sanctuary.

The church's external walls are rendered up to a height of about 1.8 m (6 ft). They are supported by integrated piers and buttresses, rendered to their full height of four metres (13 ft). The hammer-beamed roof is clad externally with timber shingles and lined internally with timber.

Inside the nave, timber pews are arranged in two rows. A cross aisle links the porch to the main central aisle. In the north-east corner, near the sanctuary, is a pulpit. At the back of the nave, in the north-west corner, is an organ. The floor of the aisles is covered with vinyl tiles; in the main aisle, carpet is fixed over the tiles. The nave has five main stained glass windows, three to the north and two to the south. The windows depict the Five Glorious Mysteries of the Blessed Virgin Mary. In the centre of the western gable is a small stained glass rose window with a geometrical pattern.

The nave is separated from the sanctuary by a low timber communion rail. The sanctuary has a carpeted floor, a large timber altar table and three more stained glass windows, depicting Christ in the centre, Saint Mary to the left and Saint John to the right.

=== Grounds ===
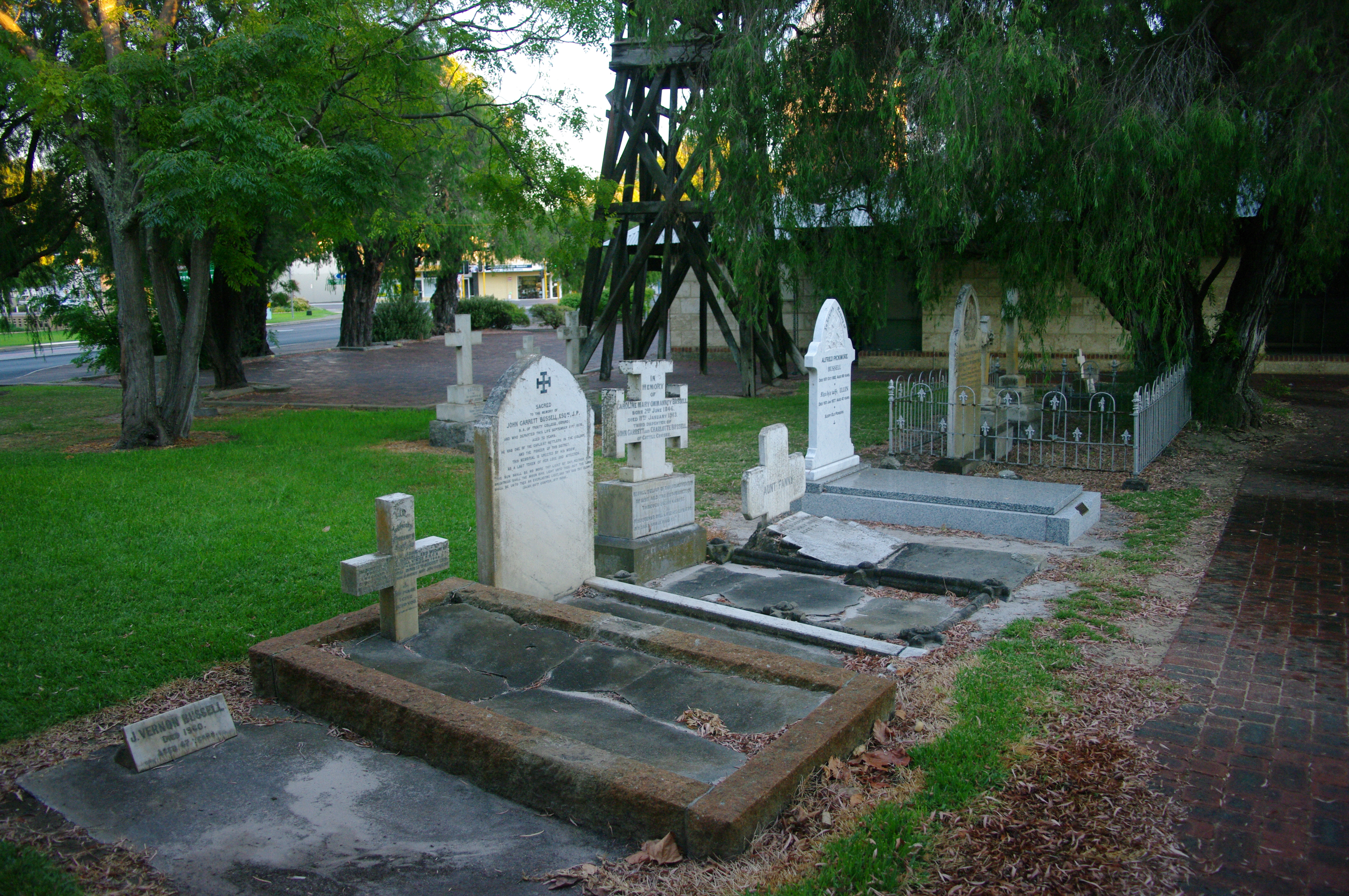
Some of the graves, and the posts and platform of the bell tower, in 2011

The church grounds are grassed, apart from some small areas of concrete or brick paving, and are also shaded by numerous informally spaced mature peppermint trees. To the south and west of the church is a small graveyard with about thirty irregularly spaced visible graves dating from around 1840.

Most of the graves are marked with a marble headstone about one metre (3 ft 3 in) high. Many also have either a wrought iron grave surround, or a flat stone slab covering. The graveyard also features a modern low wall on which memorial plaques are displayed.

=== Bell tower ===
A bell tower is located in the north-west corner of the graveyard. It is about 10 m (30 ft) tall and constructed to a square plan, using six main and two minor timber posts. The posts lean inwards to support a platform. Above the platform, hangs the bell, which is covered by a timber shingled roof in the form of a pyramid.

=== Hall site ===
The site of the former church hall is registered on the State Register of Heritage Places as a child site of the church and graveyard site. Built in 1914, the former hall, which was made of timber and iron, was re-located in the 1990s to Lot 26 Layman Road Lockville at Wonnerup. It has since been replaced by a new St Mary's Family Centre, which is used for various purposes, including meetings, wedding receptions, large church services and Sunday School.

=== Rectory ===
A substantial building in the Federation Italianate style, the rectory is located at 43 Peel Terrace, immediately to the east of the church. It is similarly registered as a child site of the church and graveyard site. The rectory has limestone walls with stucco trim, a faceted bay window, and an iron roof. Extending across its southern facade from the bay window is a deep verandah. The roof is substantial, steeply pitched, and flanked by tall limestone chimneys with rendered caps.

== See also ==
- Georgiana Molloy Anglican School
- List of Anglican churches in Western Australia
- List of State Register of Heritage Places in the City of Busselton
