= Ballaarat tramline =

Railway line in Western Australia

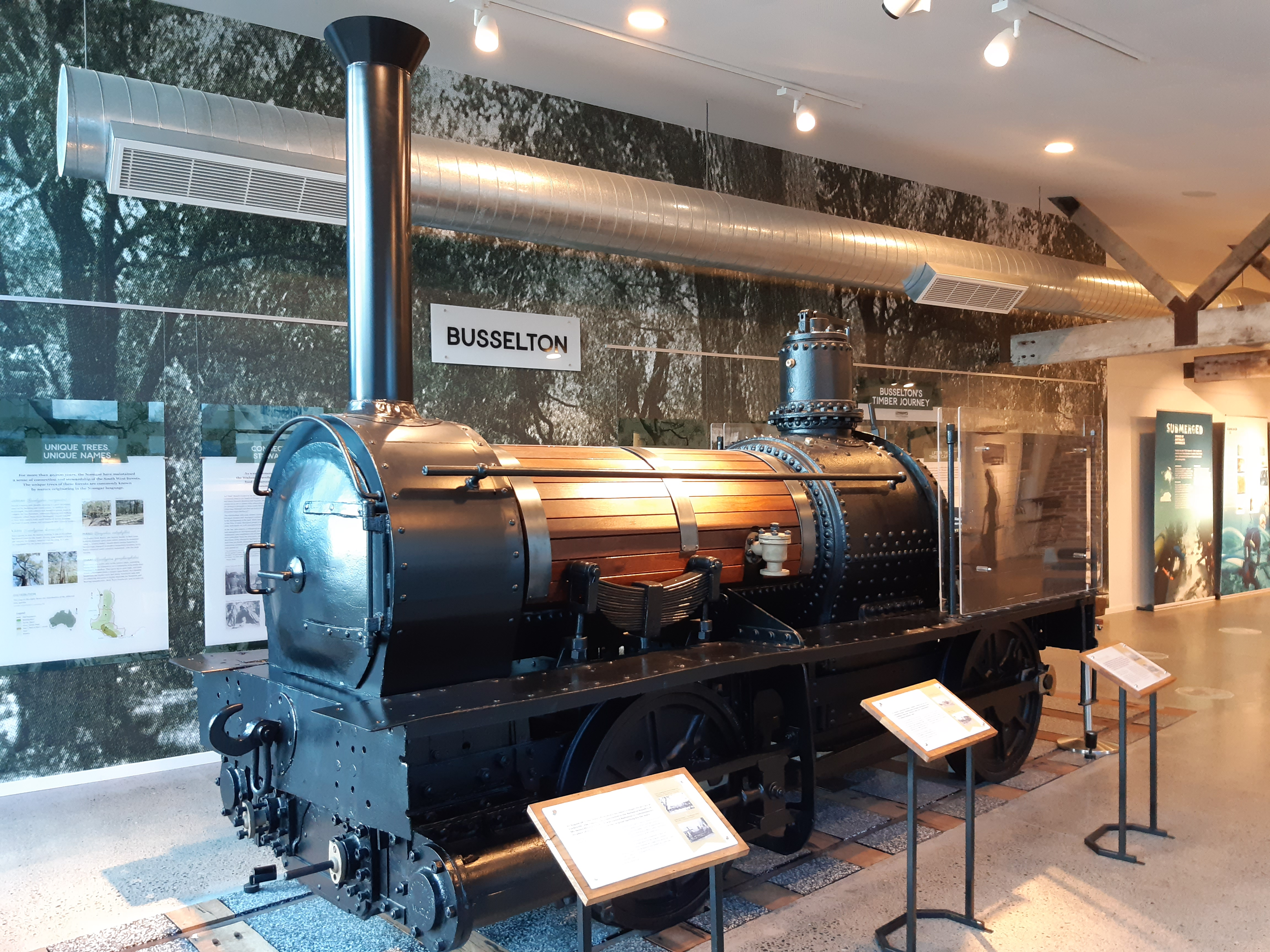

The Ballaarat tramline, also known as the Lockville–Yoganup railway, was the first railway in Western Australia, constructed in 1871 by the Western Australian Timber Company. The railway was used to transport timber from forests in the South West to the company's jetty at Lockville using the Ballaarat steam engine.

== History ==
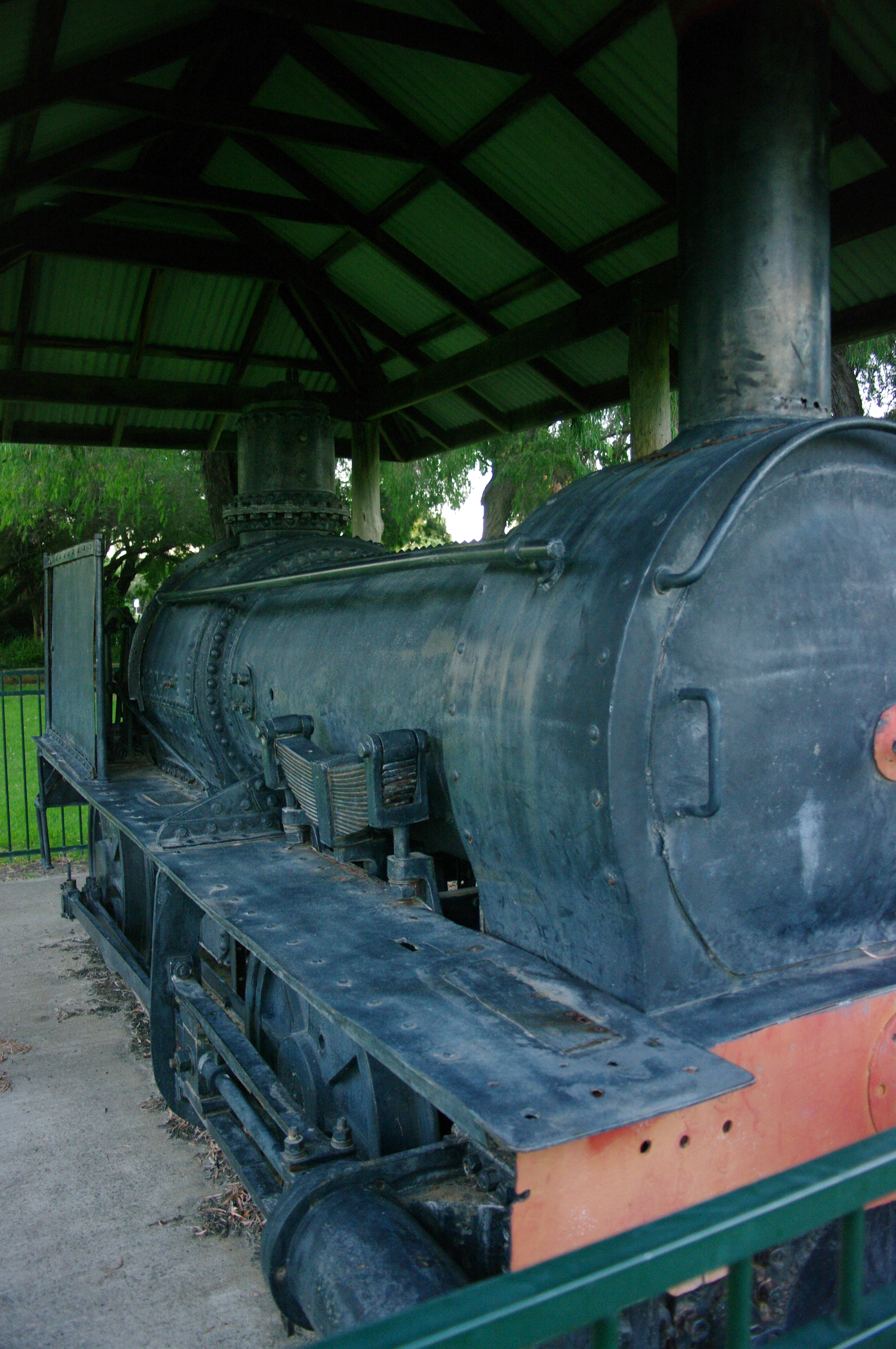
The preserved Ballaarat steam locomotive

The 19-kilometre-long (12 mi) tramline was constructed in 1871 between Lockville and Yoganup. Governor Weld officially opened the railway on 23 December 1871. It was the first railway in Western Australia, and also included the Ballaarat Bridge – the first bridge constructed to conduct a steam locomotive in Western Australia.

The name Ballaarat tramline originated from the locomotive that operated on the railway, named Ballaarat by the Mayor of Melbourne on the original spelling of the Victorian town of Ballarat where the locomotive was constructed.

The Western Australian Timber Company was liquidated in 1888 and its assets auctioned, and in 1897 their former timber concession was leased to the Jarrah Wood and Saw Mills Company. The section of the Ballaarat Tramline route south of the Bunbury-Busselton railway was reused for the Nannup branch railway between Wonnerup and Jarrahwood.

A plaque and locomotive wheel commemorating the Ballaarat tramline is located at Wonnerup House. The Ballaarat steam engine now resides in Railway House, attached to the visitor centre on the Busselton foreshore.
