= List of acts of the Parliament of Western Australia from 1907 =

This is a list of acts of the Parliament of Western Australia for the year 1907.

== 1907 ==
Short title, or popular name	Citation	Royal assent
Long title
	No. 1 of 1907	30 July 1907
An Act to apply out of the Consolidated Revenue Fund and from Moneys to Credit of the General Loan Fund the sum of Six Hundred and Thirty-nine Thousand Three Hundred and Three Pounds to the Service of the Year ending 30th June, 1908.
Public Education Amendment Act 1907	No. 2 of 1907	2 September 1907
An Act to further amend the Public Education Act, 1899. (Note: Public Education Act 1899 (63 Vict. No. 3))
Statistics Act 1907	No. 3 of 1907	
Reserve Act 1907	No. 4 of 1907	
Port Hedland–Marble Bar Railway Act 1907	No. 5 of 1907	19 September 1907
An Act to authorise the Construction of a Railway from Port Hedland to Marble Bar.
	No. 6 of 1907	19 September 1907
An Act to amend the Collie–Narrogin Railway Act, 1904. (Note: Collie–Narrogin Railway Act 1904 (No. 16))
Marriage Act Amendment Act 1907	No. 7 of 1907	
Sale of Government Property Act 1907	No. 8 of 1907	
Navigation Act Amendment Act 1907	No. 9 of 1907	
Police Act Amendment Act 1907	No. 10 of 1907	
	No. X of 1907	
	No. 20 of 1907	
Mt. Magnet–Black Range Railway Act 1907	No. 21 of 1907	20 December 1907
An Act to authorise the Construction of a Railway from Mt. Magnet to Black Range.
Fremantle Dock Act 1907	No. 22 of 1907	20 December 1907
An Act to authorise the Construction of a Graving Dock at Fremantle.
Pinjarra–Marrinup Railway Act 1907	No. 23 of 1907	20 December 1907
An Act to authorise the Construction of a Railway from Pinjarra to Marrinup.
Wonnerup–Nannup Railway Act 1907	No. 24 of 1907	20 December 1907
An Act to authorise the construction of a Railway from Jarrahwood to Nannup as an extension of the Wonnerup-Jarrahwood Railway.
North Fremantle Municipal Tramways Act 1907	No. 25 of 1907	20 December 1907
An Act to confirm a Provisional Order authorising the construction of Tramways in the Municipality of North Fremantle, and to empower the Municipality to construct and maintain works for the generation and supply of Electricity for motive purposes.
	Provisional Order.	
Narrogin–Wickepin Railway Act 1907	No. 26 of 1907	20 December 1907
An Act to authorise the construction of a Railway from Narrogin to Wickepin.
Electoral Act 1907	No. 27 of 1907	
	No. 28 of 1907	
Government Railways Amendment Act 1907	No. 29 of 1907	20 December 1907
An Act to amend the Government Railways Act, 1904. (Note: Government Railways Act 1904 (No. 23))
Nedlands Park Tramways Act 1907	No. 30 of 1907	20 December 1907
An Act to confirm a Provisional Order authorising the Construction of certain Tramways in the Municipal District of Subiaco and the Claremont Road District.
	Provisional Order.	
State Children Act 1907 or the Child Welfare Act 1907	No. 31 of 1907	
Newcastle–Bolgart Railway Act 1907	No. 32 of 1907	20 December 1907
An Act to authorise the Construction of a Railway from Newcastle to Bolgart.
Marine Insurance Act 1907	No. 33 of 1907	20 January 1908
An Act to codify the Law relating to Marine Insurance.

== Sources ==
- "legislation.wa.gov.au".
