= Ballaarat (locomotive) =

Preserved Australian steam locomotive

Coordinates: 33°38′42″S 115°20′44″E

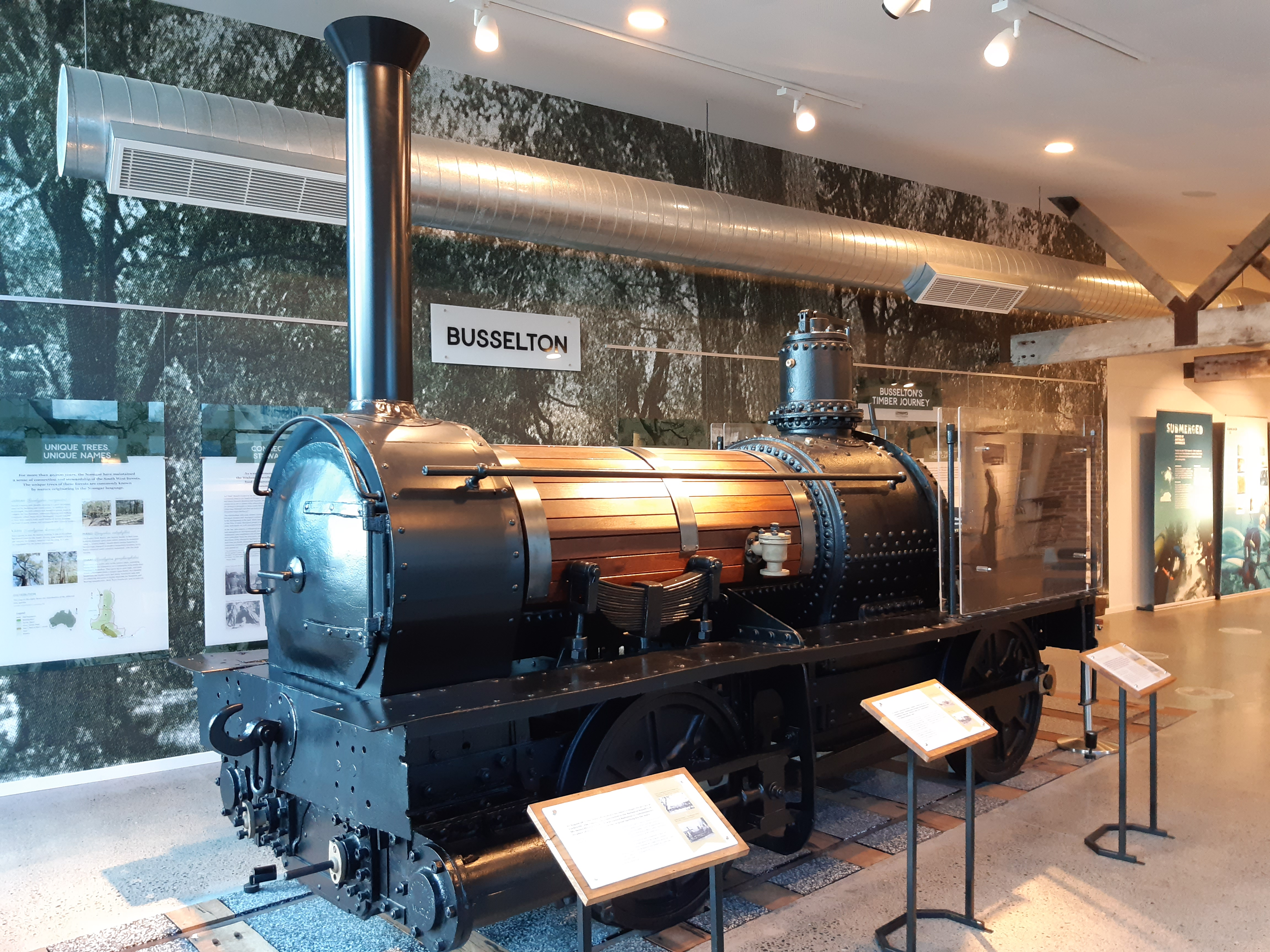
Ballaarat on display in Railway House, at the Busselton Visitor Centre

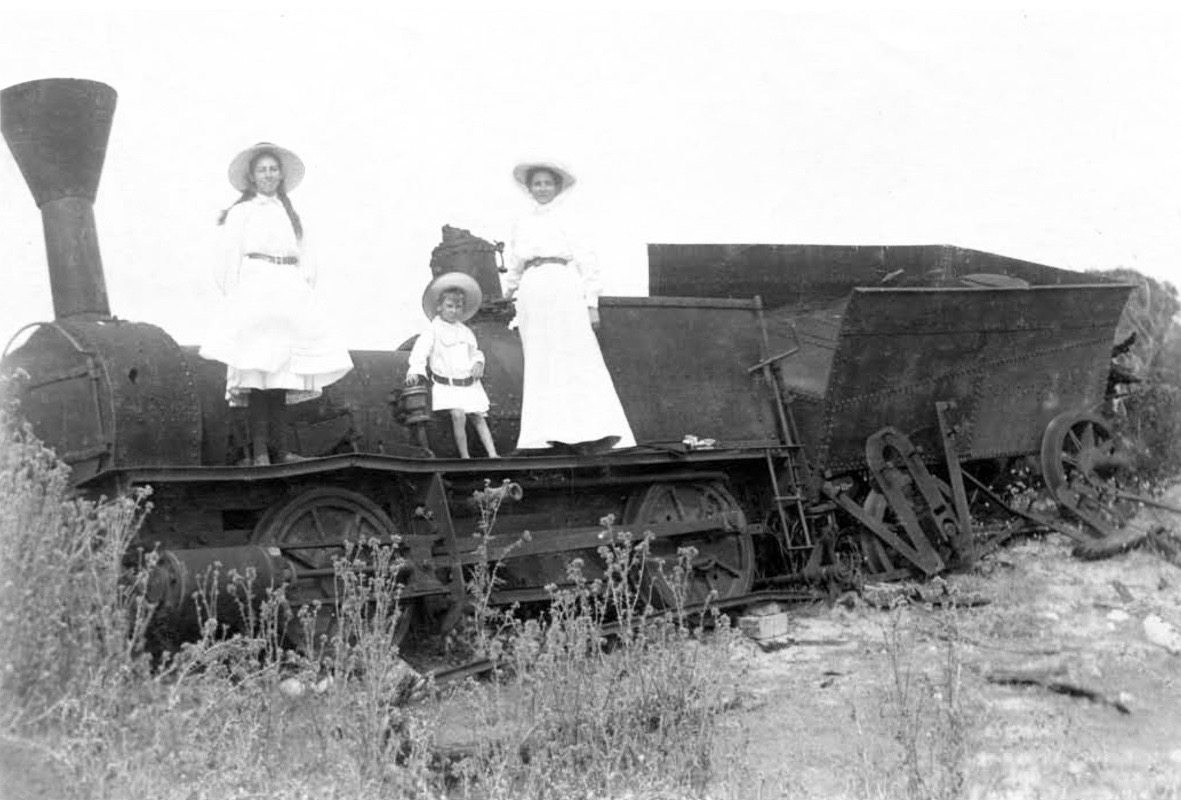
About 1908, Ballaarat lay dilapidated in a paddock at Lockville, near Busselton, after it had been damaged by fire. Two decades later its first, partial restoration started.

Ballaarat is a steam locomotive built by James Hunt's Victoria Foundry in the city of Ballarat, Victoria in 1871. It was the first 3 ft 6 in (1067 mm) gauge locomotive built in Australia. It was purchased by the Western Australian Timber Company, which was awarded one of only three milling concessions granted in the colony. The company had 181,500 acres to mill at Yoganup, near the town of Busselton.

== History ==
=== Active use ===
The Western Australian Timber Company shipped the locomotive from Victoria to transport timber to the coast over the Ballaarat tramline from its mill – first located at Yoganup, 18 km (11 mi) inland, and later as far as 30 km (19 mi) inland. The company had built the colony's first timber-railed railway line (on which timber rails were topped by an iron strap to reduce wear) from the mill to a 90 metres (300 feet) landing jetty at Lockville, near Wonnerup, 7 kilometres (4.3 miles) north-east of Busselton. Timber milling was the region's biggest industry and timber was the biggest export industry in Western Australia until World War 1.

The narrow-gauge locomotive was named Ballaarat by the mayor of Melbourne, following the alternative spelling of the city where it was built, Ballarat. The name originated in two Aboriginal words, balla and arat, meaning "resting place".

The locomotive was used by the Western Australian Timber Company until the mill closed in 1887.

=== Abandonment and repair ===
Ballaarat was damaged by fire when it was stored in a shed at Lockville in the early 1900s, then left exposed to the elements in a nearby paddock.

What was left of Ballaarat was later donated by land-owner Percy Reynolds to the Municipality of Busselton. It was offered to the Western Australian Museum, then the Western Australian Government Railways, who after many years of correspondence, eventually accepted it and moved it to Midland railway workshops for refitting. It was not until 1929, 42 years after it was decommissioned, that Ballaarat finally received partial repair work thanks to its being featured in a State Centenary parade through Perth.

=== On display ===
Ballaarat remained in Perth for several years until the Busselton community intervened in 1934 when they requested the locomotive's return. After three years of lobbying, it returned home and was installed as a display piece in Victoria Square in 1937. There it was visited by many local people and tourists over the years. However, exposure to the elements for 75 years left it weatherbeaten and rusted. It became the oldest remaining Australian-built steam locomotive.

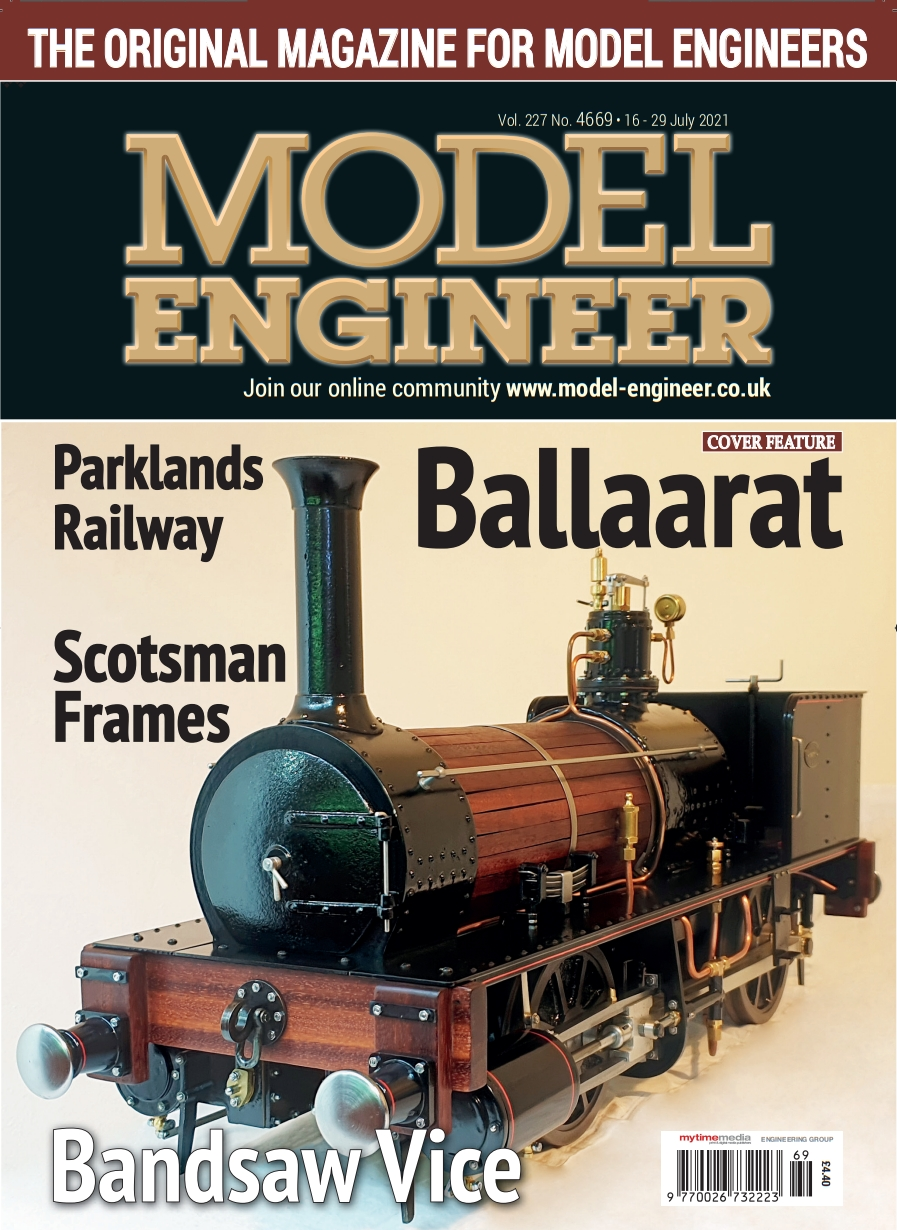
Cover page of Model Engineer, featuring a 1:10 scale (5‑inch gauge) live steam model of Ballaarat

In 2012, following a Lotterywest grant, local business South West Machining Centre, a team of volunteers and a rail heritage consultant undertook its preservation works. The locomotive was completely dismantled and more than 550 volunteer hours were recorded.

In 2016, when the disused Busselton railway station was moved to the foreshore to become the City of Busselton's visitor centre, Ballaarat was moved there as part of an innovative museum and conference and function centre, where the remaining work was completed.

Restoration was completed in March 2017 and since that time Ballaarat has been on public display, accompanied by information, artefacts and images of the region's timber industry.

== Live steam model ==
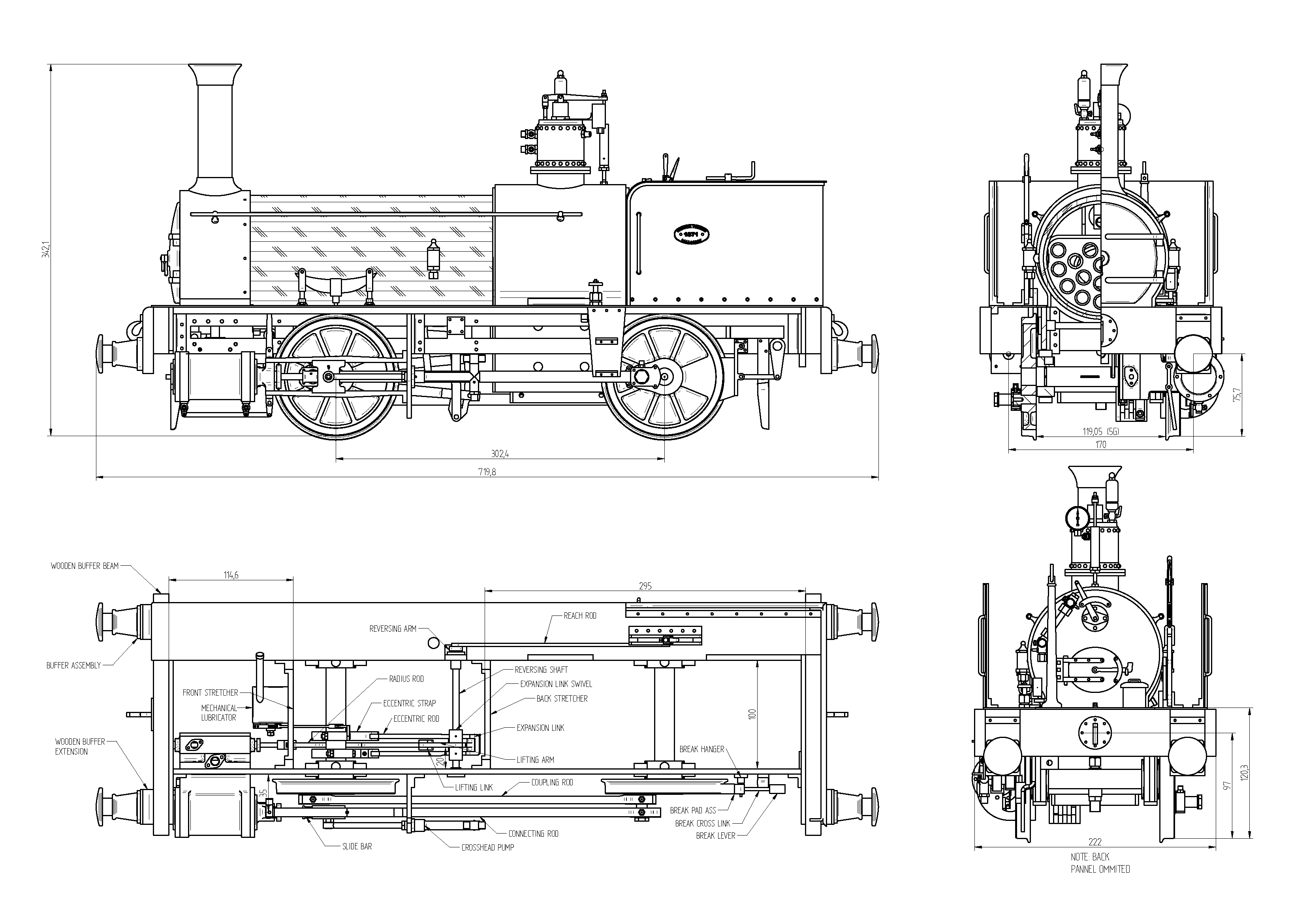
General arrangement drawing of the 5‑gauge live steam model of Ballaarat by Luker

Ballaarat has been featured in Model Engineer magazine as a 5 in (130 mm) gauge working live steam construction project aimed at the beginner who wants to gain model engineering experience. The model runs on coal or anthracite and has a fully functioning steam boiler of 2 litres (3.5 imperial pints; 4.2 US pints) capacity running at 90 psi (620 kPa) steam pressure.

== See also ==
- WAGR G class locomotive G233, Leschenault Lady
