= Vasse and Wonnerup Floodgates =

Australian heritage site

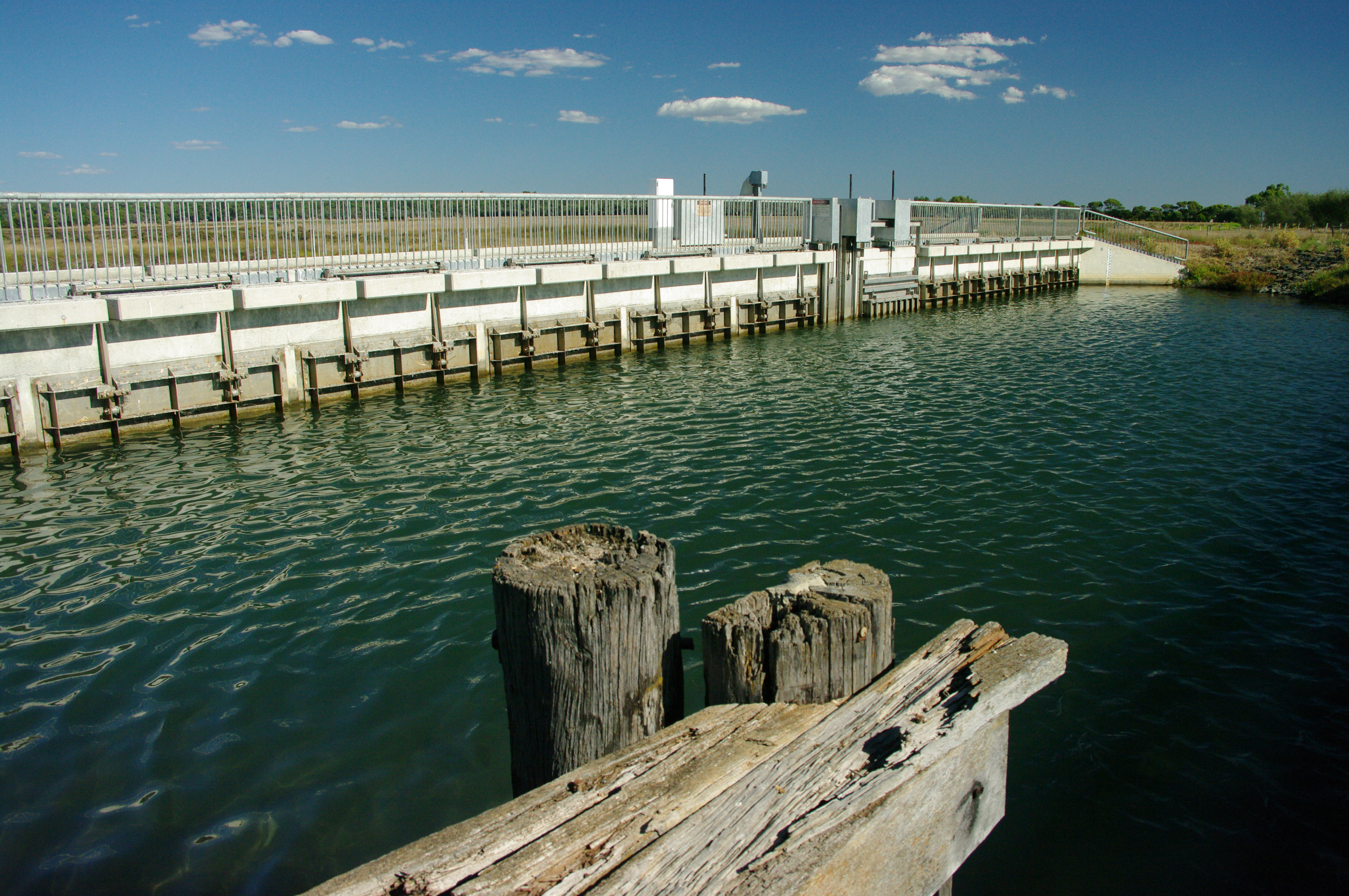
Wonnerup floodgates from the northern side foreground includes a remnant of the abutment of the timber floodgates

The Vasse and Wonnerup Floodgates is a heritage listed site in Western Australia that comprises two locations. The two locations are the site of the Vasse floodgates on the Vasse River and the Wonnerup floodgates on the Wonnerup Estuary. In addition, the 2004 site of the Vasse floodgates was also the site of the Ballarat Bridge which was built in 1871 as part of a logging rail line where the Ballarat Steam engine was the first steam engine to operate in Western Australia.

The installation of the floodgates caused the formation of the fresh water Vasse-Wonnerup Wetlands.

== Vasse Floodgates ==
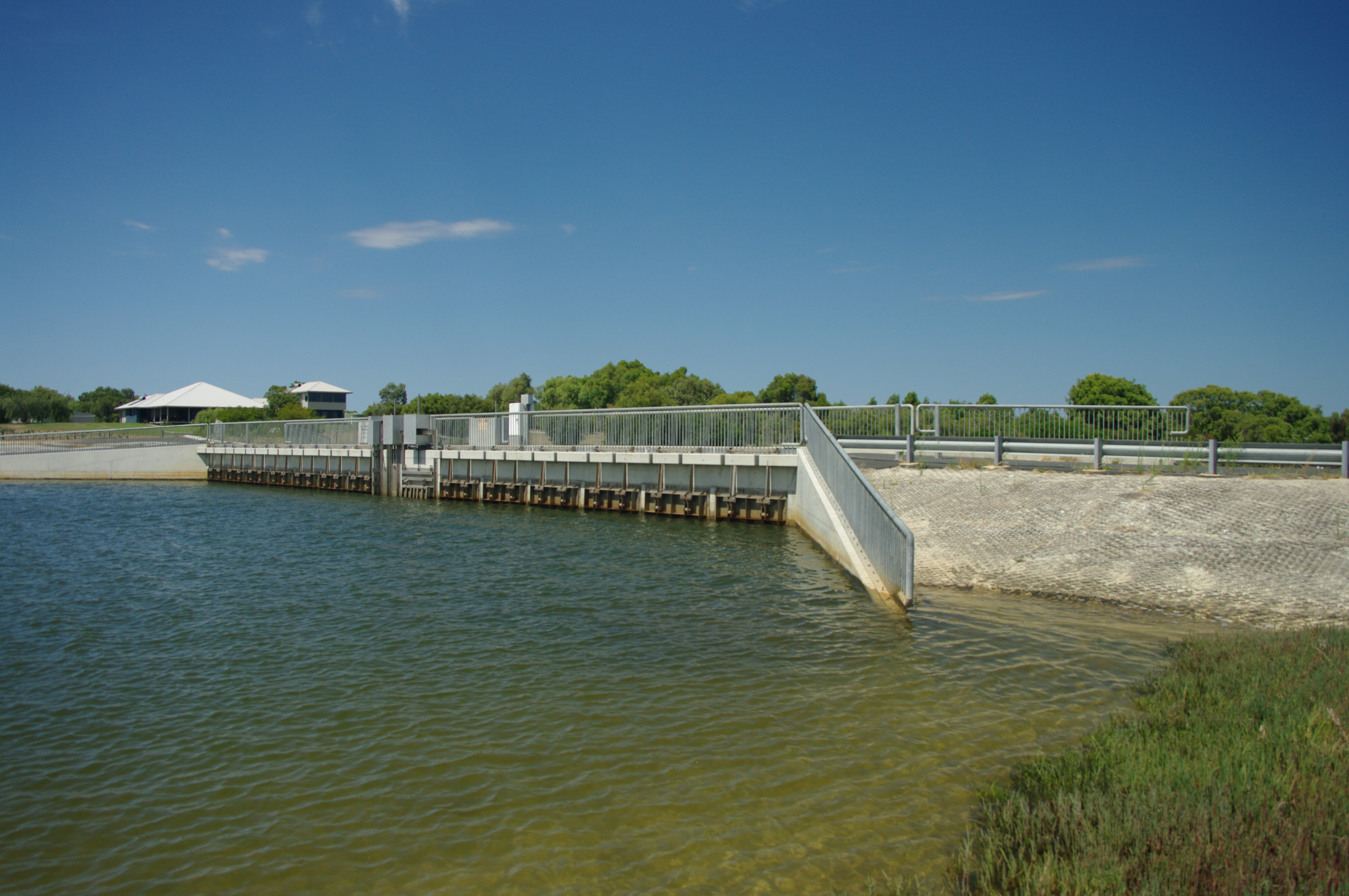
Vasse Floodgates, built c. 2004

The original Vasse floodgates were built in 1907 by the Public Works Department and made from local timber; the site chosen for the floodgates was near the existing Ballarat bridge. These gates were later refurbished in 1927, 1942, and 1991. The final refurbishment in 1991 was in response to the 1990 listing of the wetlands under the Ramsar Convention. Though the floodgate continued to operate as designed, by 2003 the gates were leaking salt water into the wetlands and had to be replaced. Investigation of the area revealed that the Ballarat bridge was in a state of disrepair and should be removed for safety reasons; once this occurred a new set of automated floodgates were built on the site. In 2004 with the new gates operating, the old floodgates were removed and a section was given to the Busselton Historical Society, which currently has it on display inside the Old Butter Factory Museum.

== Wonnerup Floodgates ==
Like the Vasse floodgates, the Wonnerup floodgates were built by the Public Works Department in 1907. The site chosen was near the Forest Beach Road bridge and like the Vasse floodgates, they were refurbished in 1927, 1942, 1991 and replaced in 2004. The new site was 20 m (66 ft) upstream from the original gates. Once the new gates were operational, the old gates were removed and destroyed, though the abutments were left in place, with the south abutment having a high degree of authenticity from the original structure.
