= Georgiana Molloy Anglican School =

Location
- Yalyalup, Western Australia; Australia; 33°39′37″S 115°22′56″E

Information
- Type: Independent co-educational primary and secondary day school
- Motto: Rejoice in Service
- Denomination: Anglican
- Established: 2003
- Headmaster: Brad Evans
- Enrolment: 1000+
- Website: www.gmas.wa.edu.au

Georgiana Molloy Anglican School is an independent Anglican co-educational primary and secondary day school located in Yalyalup, Western Australia, a suburb of Busselton, and is named after the notable early Western Australian settler Georgiana Molloy. The school was established in 2003 under the guidance of Tom Wilmot, who recognised the need for an Anglican School on "the Cape".

== School development ==
In 2007, the school finished Stage 3 of the development process representing a A$6 million investment, and involving the construction of six classrooms, two science laboratories, wood and metal workshops, two information and communications technology laboratories, specialist facilities for music, art and drama, staff preparation areas and student amenities, meeting rooms, and an undercover activity area.

In 2010, the school received A$3.5 million funding as part of the Building the Education Revolution program to construct a Multi-purpose Activity Centre (commonly referred to as the 'MAC'), with a seating capacity of over 1,500 and two full-sized courts inside which can accommodate a multitude of sports such as basketball, indoor soccer, hockey and badminton. The complex was completed in early 2012.

== See also ==
- St Mary's Anglican Church, Busselton
