= W.A. Timber Company =

Syndicate of Victorian investors

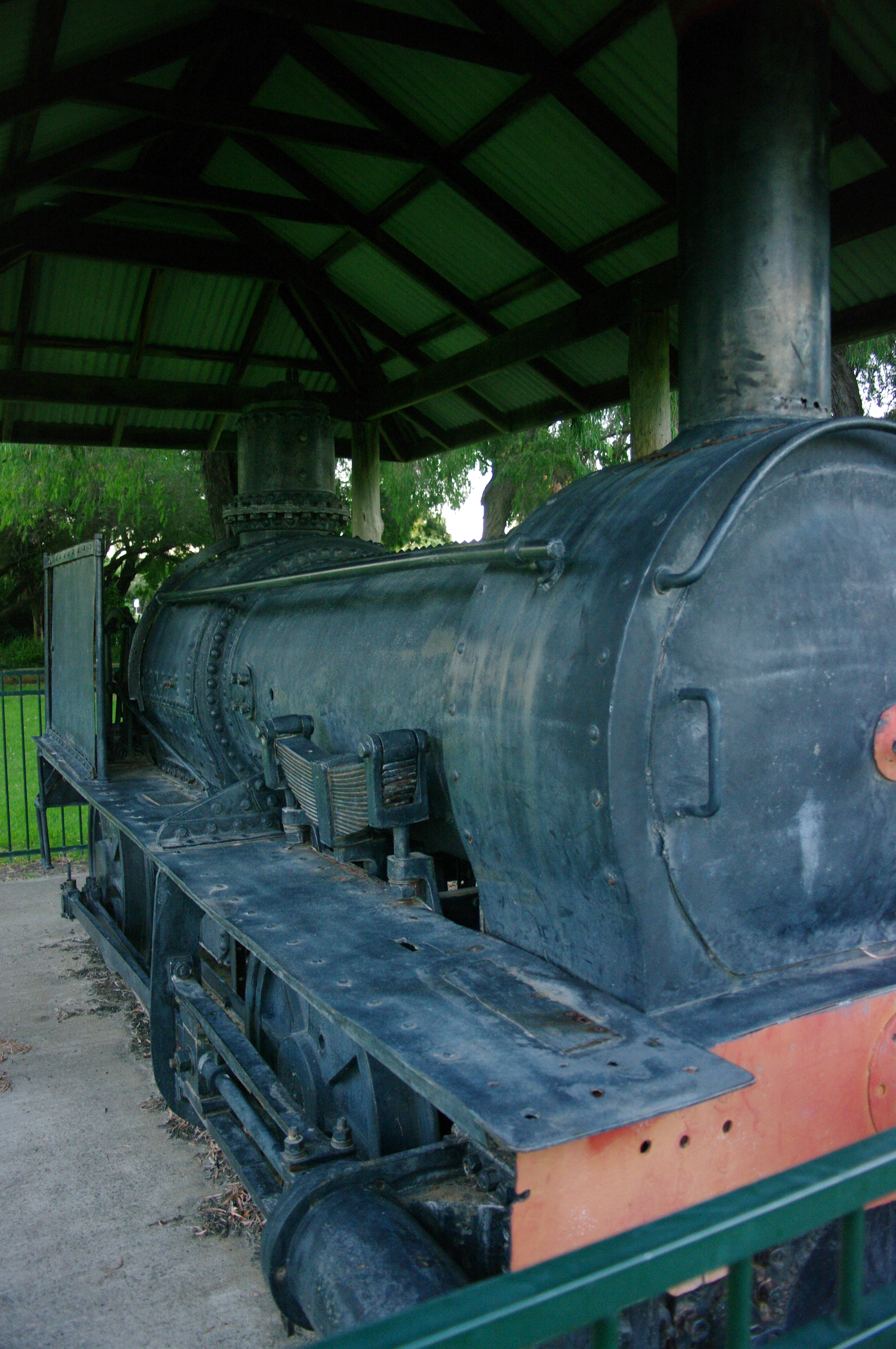
The company's locomotive, Ballaarat, was on display here in Victoria Square, Busselton, for 75 years. It is now restored and displayed indoors at the city's visitor information centre.

W.A. Timber Company was a syndicate of Victorian investors granted a timber concession of 181,500 acres on Geographe Bay in the south west of Western Australia in 1870. (Note: Also found as WA Jarrah Timber Company.)

The company went on to develop a mill and jetty at Lockville, 7 kilometres (4.3 miles) north-east of Busselton. (Note: Lockville and Lockeville are variant spellings found in different sources.)

The locomotive ordered for the mill railway, named Ballaarat, was the first steam locomotive to operate in Western Australia, and the first to be built in Australia for 1067 mm (3 ft 6 in) narrow gauge. The railway was more commonly known as the Ballaarat tramline.

The W.A. Timber Company was liquidated in 1888 and its assets were auctioned.

== See also ==
- Nannup railway line
- Tuart Forest
- Vasse and Wonnerup Floodgates
