= Edward Shann =

Australian economist and historian

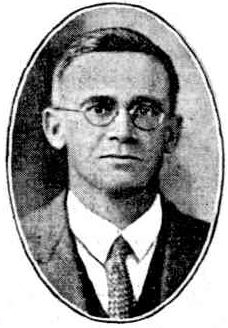
- Born: April 30, 1884; Hobart, Tasmania, Australia
- Died: May 23, 1935 (aged 51); Adelaide, South Australia, Australia
- Spouse: Alice Eddie

Academic background
- Education: Queen's College (University of Melbourne)

Academic work
- School or tradition: Classical Liberalism
- Institutions: University of Western Australia; University of Adelaide
- Notable students: H. C. Coombs; John La Nauze; Paul Hasluck; Pike Curtin; Arthur Tange

Edward Owen Giblin Shann (30 April 1884 – 23 May 1935, often written as E. O. G. Shann) was an Australian economist and historian. At a time when Australia's dominant economic philosophy favoured protectionist tariffs, Shann championed a more liberal approach. He is perhaps best remembered for his prediction of the Great Depression based on an analysis of similarities between the economic climate of the late 1880s and that of the late 1920s, for his involvement in the development of the University of Western Australia, and for his numerous works on economics and the defence of free trade.

== Early life and education ==
Shann was born in 1884 in Hobart, Tasmania to Frank and Frances Shann, and was the youngest of four children. The family relocated to Victoria in the late 1880s following the departure of his mother.

The 1890s in Australia were characterized by a serious economic depression, and the Shann family suffered great financial difficulty during this time. Nonetheless Edward was able to attend Wesley College and later Queen's College, University of Melbourne thanks to scholarships and the support of his brother Frank.

Shann was a polymath and explored many different fields of study, but specialized in history and political economy. He graduated with a Bachelor of Arts with first class honours in these fields at the top of his class in 1904.

== Later life and career ==
Following his graduation in 1904 he taught briefly at his alma mater, as a temporary lecturer in constitutional history. Apart from a brief stint as acting professor of philosophy at the University of Adelaide in 1906, a posting he apparently regretted, he would lecture in Melbourne until his departure for the London School of Economics.

In September 1908 he left Australia to attend the LSE where he intended to pursue a D.Sc., although his studies would ultimately be cut short due to illness. While there he studied French syndicalism and was influenced by the Fabian Society and prominent British socialists such as George Bernard Shaw and Sidney Webb and Beatrice Webb, whom he came to know personally. He would return to Melbourne a believer in rational socialism but this flirtation was ultimately short-lived.

In 1910 he returned from London and resumed work as a lecturer. He was offered the chair of political science at the University of Peking that same year, which he declined; in 1911 he accepted a position as lecturer in charge of history and economics at the University of Queensland. He would remain there through 1912.

Throughout this period he supported Liberal politician Donald Mackinnon and served as his political secretary.

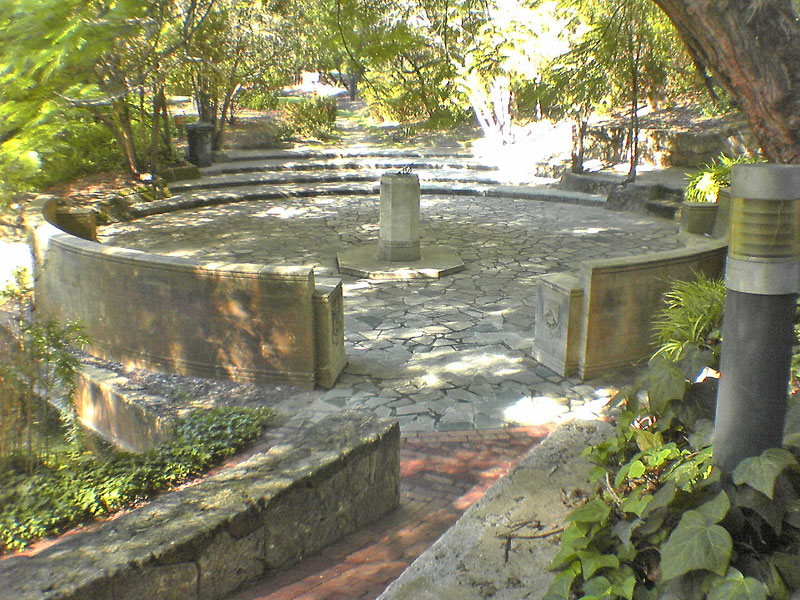
The memorial sundial at the University of Western Australia

In 1913 he became foundation professor of history at the newly founded University of Western Australia in Perth. He would become closely affiliated with the University and its development, serving as its vice-chancellor from 1921–23. His legacy at UWA is commemorated by the Shann memorial lecture (held there annually since 1961) as well as a memorial sundial and seat erected in 1937 in his honour in the sunken gardens on the campus.

In 1930 he was hired as the Bank of New South Wales' economic consultant, a full-time position in Sydney. This was the first time that such a position had been filled by an actual economist in Australia; Shann established an economics department at the bank and advised it on economic issues relevant to it. He held this position for three years, during which time he became active in an economic advisory capacity to the Australian government. To this end in 1931 he joined the Copland Committee which helped to formulate the Premiers' Plan to combat the great depression; in 1932 he assisted Sir Wallace Bruce's committee on unemployment; in 1932 he advised the government at the Ottawa Conference and again in 1933 at the London Economic Conference. In all of these roles he emerged as a strong proponent of free trade and flexible markets and against expansionary fiscal policy.

In 1933 he accepted the chair of economics at the University of Adelaide, although he remained at UWA through 1934. This would be his final appointment before his death in 1935.

== Economic positions ==
Edward Shann was a classical liberal, and defended free trade and open markets at a time when Australia favoured protectionist trade policy and tariffs.

Shann famously predicted the Great Depression in his 1927 essay, The Boom of 1890 – and now, in which he likened the economic conditions of the late 1880s to those of the late 1920s, warning that a similarly dire economic decline might follow for similar reasons.

His seminal work, 1930's An Economic History of Australia, is still a very well regarded reference to Australia's economic policies and institutions from the late 19th century into the early 20th.

He wrote prolifically on the subject of economics, always advancing a liberal position. His collection of essays, Bond or Free?, juxtapose economic liberalism against paternal protectionism and, as in the title, ask whether Australians should prefer bondage or freedom. In this work he came out in opposition to more public works, and in this as well as in his vocal opposition to countercyclical fiscal policy he fell decidedly outside of the Keynesian mould that gained popularity during the depression years.

== Personal life ==
Edward Shann married Alice Eddie in 1911 in Melbourne, and together they had three daughters. One, Marjorie, later married one of Shann's more prominent students, Arthur Tange.

== Death ==
Shann's death was and remains the subject of some controversy. He was found dead on the footpath outside of his first-floor office window at the University of Adelaide, from which he had apparently fallen. This was ruled a suicide by the coroner. This explanation has always been controversial: even at the time, some of his contemporaries suggested foul play.

Later analyses suggest that while suicide was perhaps not the correct explanation, foul play probably wasn't either. Rather, it suggests that his death was probably accidental: Shann, who had suffered from nervousness throughout his life, often felt faint, and when such an episode was upon him he would tend to rush to fresh air. He had indeed complained of faintness the day of his death and had delivered a lecture sitting down, unusually for him.

In a previous episode, described by his brother in a letter, Shann had hurt his finger and then rushed to the window for some fresh air; upon opening the window he collapsed and nearly fell out. Similarly, Keith Hancock wrote in a letter that Shann had told him he had been feeling faint, and related that he would often open a window to get some fresh air and then lose his balance. Unfortunately, these letters only surfaced after the coroner had pronounced the death a suicide. In light of them it now seems more likely that Shann had a similar episode, opened his window, and, feeling faint, simply fell out.

== Bibliography ==
- Cattle Chosen (1926)
- The Boom of 1890 – and now (1927)
- An Economic History of Australia (1930)
- Bond or Free? (1930)
- The Crisis in Australian Finance (1931)
- The Battle of the Plans (1931)
- The Australian Price Structure (1933)
- Quotas or Stable Money? (1933)
