= Wonnerup massacre =

Massacre in Western Australia

Wonnerup (Western Australia)

The Wonnerup massacre, also known as the Wonnerup "Minninup" massacre, was the killing of dozens of Wardandi Noongar people by European settlers in the vicinity of Wonnerup, Western Australia in February 1841. The massacre on Wardandi-Doonan land in the south-west of Western Australia took place after Gaywal/Gaywaar, a Wardandi Man, speared and killed George Layman, a settler at Wonnerup on 21 February 1841. The leaders of the punitive massacre were Layman's neighbours John Bussell and Captain John Molloy, resident magistrate of the district. Settlers from the Wonnerup, Capel, Busselton and Augusta area joined them to commit "one of the most bloodthirsty deeds ever committed by Englishmen".

== Causes of conflict ==
The causes of conflict between colonial settlers and Wardandi Noongar people are many. One incident that caused a great deal of resentment between Gaywal and the settlers in the Busselton area was the treatment of Gaywal's son-in-law Nungundung. In February 1840 Nungundung and friends Duncock and Gerback killed Henry Campbell, a settler labourer living on the Collie River, because Campbell had badly beat Duncock. Henry Bull found this out after arresting the three young Wardandi men and questioning them. Academic Jessica White has said that this was because Campbell raped one of Gaywal's daughters but another source says that Gerback had committed this rape. The resident magistrate of the Leschenault district, Henry Bull flogged Nungundung, Duncock and Gerback for Campbell's death and let them go. Bussell was incensed at this lenient treatment and when he came across Nungundung in December 1840, he had him arrested, detained him for a while at his house Cattle Chosen and then sent him up to Perth for further punishment. There was much resentment at this arbitrary treatment of Nundundung amongst the Wardandi people after this incident and several threats were made to various settlers in the Busselton district during the following months.

== Death of George Layman ==
On 21 February 1841 eighteen Wardandi people, including Gaywal, Milligan, and Gaywal's/Gaywar's son Woberdung were working for George Layman, helping with the threshing of wheat. White settler labourers who were also helping with the work were Martin Welch and John Dawson. Mary Bryan was working as a servant in the Layman cottage with Mrs Layman.

Indebong (known by settlers as Dr Milligan) and Gaywal (also known as Gaywar and "Quibean" in various sources of the time) had an argument over the damper they were given as payment at the end of the day. The Aboriginal workers were standing around a fire outside the Layman cottage at this point. Indebong went to the cottage to complain to George Layman that Gaywal had taken his share of damper and that he had nothing for his work. Layman then came out of the cottage and told Gaywal to give the damper to Milligan, grabbing Gaywal's beard in the process, a great insult in Noongar culture. Gaywal then stepped back said "George!" and speared Layman, who ran into his cottage, calling for a gun, then laid down on the floor and died within ten minutes. Young Robert Heppingstone, son of Mary Bryan, later said that he also saw Wobudung throw a spear that went between Layman's legs. All the Noongar workers then ran away.

Oral history of the Waadandi Doonan people says that the conflict between Gaywal and Layman was over a Wardandi woman:

[Gaywal] wanted her back because that was his girl. That's the story they told, but the story was that he had a [Wardandi woman] there, and apparently, Mr Layman wouldn't let her go back … or something like that. That's what they said, but that was told to me by my grandmother...

Heppingstone was sent on horse to alert the Bussell family and Molloy of Layman's death. They were at the Bussell's house having a prayer meeting at the time as it was a Sunday. Milligan also went to the Bussell's house to report on what had happened.

== First punitive expedition ==
On 23 February Dr Green came to ascertain the cause of Layman's death. Bussell and Molloy prepared warrants. They also prevailed on Bun-ni, a Noongar constable, to help, by holding him at the Bussell residence "until a conviction that he was true and zealous induced us to liberate him". Two young Noongar boys, described as spies, were caught at Wonnerup and told settlers that Gaywal had been speared in the thigh at Mollakup. The Bussells and Molloy went out at midnight towards Mollakup with Bun-ni as guide. The party comprised 13 people. After a day and a night, hiding in the sandhills and tracking a group of Noongar people, the settlers killed seven Noongar people and captured thirteen women and children. Gaywal was not part of the group of people killed or captured. Bun-ni was then sent out to kill Gaywal and came back reporting that he had done this, but this was not so.

On 26 February Fanny Bussell noted in her diary: "In the evening John, Capt. Molloy and Mr. Northy returned. Capt. Molloy drank tea here. 7 natives killed. Gaywal supposed to be wounded."

Although John Garrett Bussell and Captain John Molloy reported that five (not seven) people were killed, in fact a larger massacre occurred. Warren Bert Kimberly wrote an account of it in 1897 after talking to colonial settlers and Noongar survivors who remembered what happened. Kimberly stated that Molloy gave orders that no women or children were to be killed. The majority of Noongar people were now hiding around Lake Minninup. Then:

Native after native was shot, and the survivors, knowing that orders had been given not to shoot the women, crouched on their knees, covered their bodies with their bokas, and cried, ‘Me yokah’ (woman). The white men had no mercy. The black men were killed by dozens, and their corpses lined the route of march of the avengers.

Oral history of the Waadandi Doonan people also says:

The first mob was caught, was just the other side of the Capel River (Mollakup). When I was a little boy we found some skulls up there. One of them had a bullet in it, it had gone through the forehead and just sticking out the back. There was quite a few with holes knocked in them in the skulls and the next mob they caught was at Muddy Lake (Mininup) that’s this side of Bunbury and then they chased the other right through Australind somewhere around Australind area they caught up they killed some more there and the rest got away.

== Second and third punitive expeditions ==
The Bussells and other settlers then returned home. At that time Charles Symmons, the Protector of Aborigines, arrived and apparently was roundly abused by the settlers. The Noongar prisoners told the Bussells and Molloy that Gaywal was retreating westward. A small party led by Vernon Bussell and three other settlers went to Mollakup, and took a group of Wardandi people hostage. On 27 February Vernon sent a message saying "bring ammunition we have none". Charles Bussell was sent out with weapons and reinforcements from Cattle Chosen, and Alfred Pickmore Bussell set out with another group of settlers from Wonnerup. When Alfred Bussell's party met Vernon's party, the Wardandi hostages ran away in fear and two Wardandi men were shot. John Garrett Bussell and his brothers then went out in a third punitive expedition, heading south to find Gaywal. They returned two days later saying that Bun-ni was not co-operating, so they would wait for Wardandi people to give Gaywal up.

== Death of Gaywal ==
On 7 March, Gaywal was killed by Lieutenant Northey's servant Kelly. He was at the forefront of a party that had gone out to continue the hunt for Gaywal. Later on, Molloy set up a trap for Woberdung and his brother Kenny on the boat of Captain Plaskett. They were then taken to Rottnest Island to be incarcerated. In January 2019, a statue of Gaywal was unveiled in Busselton; the fifth sculpture created by artist Greg James and showcased by the City of Busselton on Queen Street for the Settlement Art Project.

== Cover-up of events ==
This massacre was later "systematically downplayed" by settlers despite large numbers of Noongar people being unaccounted for after the event. A descendant of John Dawson has stated that something dreadful occurred "which seriously affected the moral of the whole community". Governor John Hutt was in charge of the Swan River Colony at the time and the settler community closed ranks against further enquiry. Molloy's typed up letterbook from February 1841 contains no recorded letters, although he and John Garrett Bussell did submit two reports to the colonial secretary, stating that, overall, eight Wardandi people were killed in the three punitive events. Fanny Bussell's diary of that period in February is missing four pages, although this has been attributed by Edward Shann to wanting to conceal the argument with Symmons that occurred at the time.
