= Jarrahwood, Western Australia =

Jarrahwood
- Town
- Interactive map of Jarrahwood
- Coordinates: 33.80°S 115.67°E
- Country: Australia
- State: Western Australia
- LGA: City of Busselton
- Location: 240 km (150 mi) S of Perth; 36 km (22 mi) ESE of Busselton; 25 km (16 mi) NW of Nannup
- Established: 1932

Government
  - State electorate: Vasse
  - Federal division: Forrest

Area
  - Total: 1 km^{2} (0.39 sq mi)
- Elevation: 130 m (430 ft)

Population
  - Total: 9 (SAL 2021)
- Postcode: 6275
- Mean max temp: 22.8 °C (73.0 °F)
- Mean min temp: 8.7 °C (47.7 °F)
- Annual rainfall: 908.5 mm (35.77 in)

Jarrahwood is a small town located in the South West region of Western Australia, near the Vasse Highway between Busselton and Nannup. At the 2021 census, the area had a population of nine.

== History ==
The town is named for the Jarrah Wood and Saw Mills Company which operated in the area and operated a private railway from the district to Wonnerup, which was purchased by the Government in 1906. It was gazetted in 1932. The town lost much of its population after the closure of the local mill in 1982. A newspaper report from around this time described the town as containing "two schools, a hospital, a sizeable town hall, a number of diverse shops, a post office and about 50 company cottages".

== Climate ==
Jarrahwood experiences a Mediterranean climate (Köppen climate classification Csb) with warm-to-hot summers and cool winters. It generally receives more rainfall and cooler minimum temperatures than Busselton.

Climate data for Jarrahwood
Month	Jan	Feb	Mar	Apr	May	Jun	Jul	Aug	Sep	Oct	Nov	Dec	Year
Record high °C (°F)	43.7 (110.7)	42.5 (108.5)	41.2 (106.2)	35.0 (95.0)	29.5 (85.1)	24.0 (75.2)	23.9 (75.0)	25.7 (78.3)	30.5 (86.9)	34.3 (93.7)	38.5 (101.3)	40.5 (104.9)	43.7 (110.7)
Mean daily maximum °C (°F)	30.0 (86.0)	30.2 (86.4)	27.8 (82.0)	23.9 (75.0)	20.1 (68.2)	17.3 (63.1)	16.5 (61.7)	17.0 (62.6)	18.4 (65.1)	20.9 (69.6)	24.1 (75.4)	27.6 (81.7)	22.8 (73.0)
Mean daily minimum °C (°F)	12.8 (55.0)	13.6 (56.5)	11.9 (53.4)	8.8 (47.8)	6.8 (44.2)	5.4 (41.7)	5.0 (41.0)	5.3 (41.5)	6.0 (42.8)	7.5 (45.5)	9.6 (49.3)	11.2 (52.2)	8.7 (47.7)
Record low °C (°F)	1.5 (34.7)	3.2 (37.8)	1.0 (33.8)	−1.2 (29.8)	−3.0 (26.6)	−4.4 (24.1)	−3.2 (26.2)	−2.5 (27.5)	−2.7 (27.1)	−2.0 (28.4)	−1.5 (29.3)	1.0 (33.8)	−4.4 (24.1)
Average precipitation mm (inches)	15.5 (0.61)	12.9 (0.51)	22.1 (0.87)	48.7 (1.92)	121.4 (4.78)	153.7 (6.05)	178.1 (7.01)	147.7 (5.81)	101.2 (3.98)	55.0 (2.17)	39.7 (1.56)	16.4 (0.65)	908.5 (35.77)
Source: Bureau of Meteorology
