= Nannup railway line =

Former railway line in Western Australia

Nannup branch

Overview
- Owner: Public Transport Authority
- Termini: Wonnerup; Nannup

Service
- Type: Heavy rail

History
- Opened: June 1871 (as Ballaarat tramway) then in stages until 31 March 1909 (Jarrahwood–Nannup)

Technical
- Line length: 62 km (39 mi)
- Track gauge: 1,067 mm (3 ft 6 in)

The Nannup branch railway, also known as the Wonnerup to Nannup railway, was a branch line of the Western Australian Government Railways (WAGR) between Wonnerup and Nannup.

== History ==
In 1897 the Jarrah Wood and Saw Mills Company leased the W.A. Timber Company's former timber concession in the South West region of Western Australia. The section of the W.A. Timber Company's Ballaarat tramway route south of the Bunbury–Busselton railway was reused by the Jarrah Wood and Saw Mills Company for the construction of a railway between Wonnerup and Jarrahwood in 1898–99.

The line operated until 1903, and was bought by the WAGR in 1907. Residents in the Nannup region were advocating for the extension to the railway in 1905 and in 1909 the Jarrahwood to Nannup line was completed and opened. Construction of this extension was authorised through the Wonnerup–Nannup Railway Act 1907, assented to on 20 December 1907.

As operated by the WAGR, the line was 38 miles 64 chains (38.80 miles, 62.44 km) from Wonnerup to Nannup and saw three trains per week in each direction during the 1940s.

The line was closed in 1984. A re-commissioning study was conducted in 1989 but did not result in the reinstatement of the railway.

== Rail Trail ==
While the rails have been lifted, the rail corridor is still owned by the Government, through the Public Transport Authority.

The section between Jarrahwood and Nannup has been converted to the Sidings Rail Trail and forms part of the Munda Biddi Trail.
