= Bussell family =

Family of early settlers in colonial Western Australia

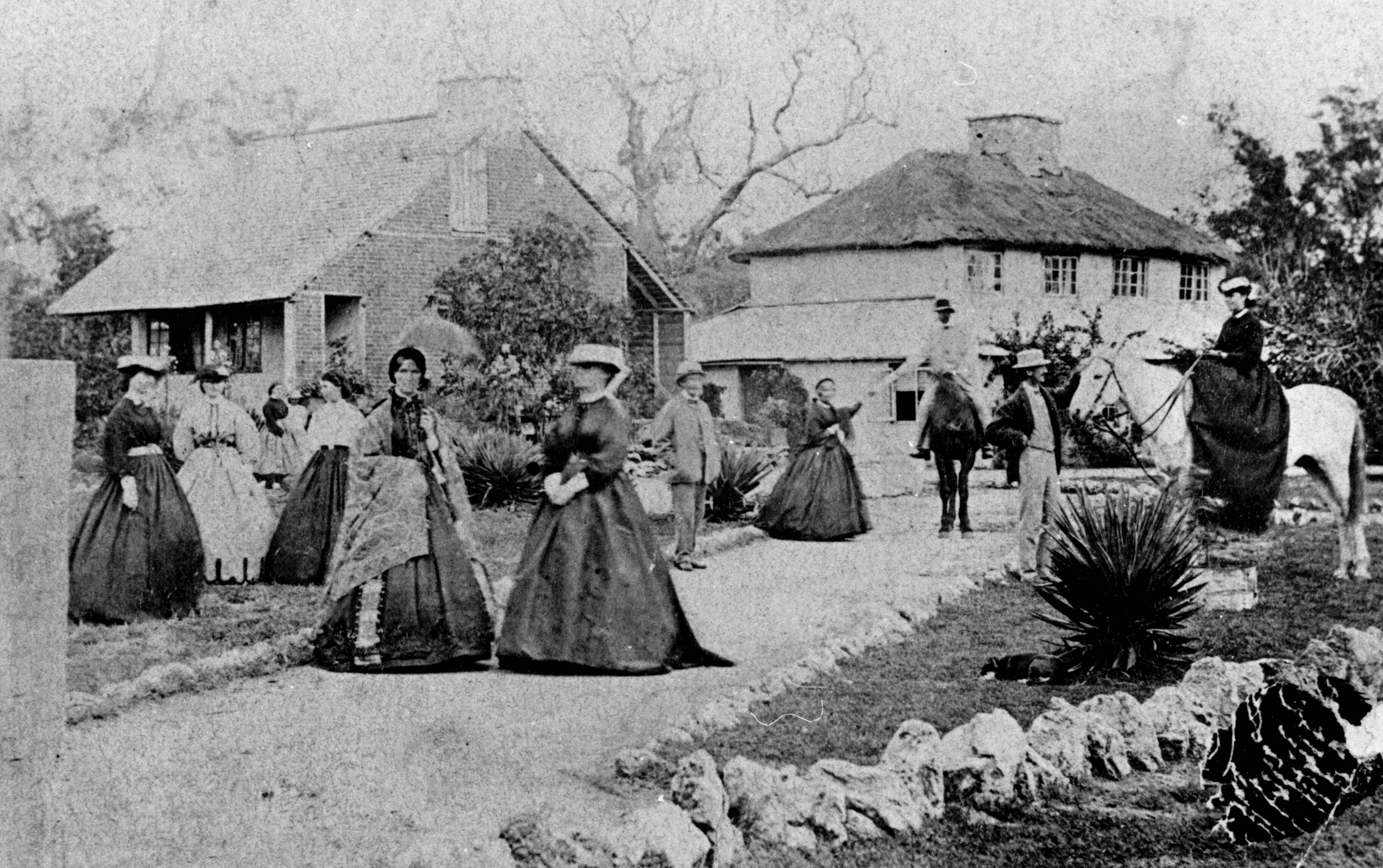
Members of the Bussell family, c. 1867.

The Bussell family were a family of early settlers in colonial Western Australia. The four brothers John, Joseph Vernon, Alfred and Charles emigrated from England on Warrior, arriving at Fremantle on 12 March 1830. Lenox, Frances and Elizabeth arrived at Fremantle on Cygnet on 27 January 1833, and Mrs Frances Louisa and Mary arrived at Albany on 19 June 1834.

On arriving in Western Australia, the Bussells found that all of the good farm land around Perth and Fremantle had already been granted, and were advised by the Governor, James Stirling, to form a sub-colony in the vicinity of Cape Leeuwin. The Bussells first settled in the Augusta area in May 1830, but met with little success. After a number of exploring expeditions, John Bussell discovered good farm land in Busselton in December 1831, and by 1834 the family had established a property named Cattle Chosen. The town of Busselton, surveyed in 1837, along with the Bussell Highway, are named in their honour.

== Massacres and shootings of Noongar people in the Vasse area ==
During the early years of their settlement in the Vasse area the Bussell family were involved in several massacres and many other shootings of Wardandi Noongar people.

On 27 June 1837 Bessie Bussell wrote a diary entry about the first massacre at Vasse. The trigger was the disappearance on 23 June of a calf of the Chapmans', fellow settlers in the area. The two Chapmans, Alfred Bussell, a corporal, Moloney and Constable Elijah Dawson were led by Bobingroot, a local Noongar man to where those who stole the calf would be. The place was called Yulijoogarup. Another Noongar man called Nungandung refused and ran away. Kenny and Jim, two Noongar men, escaped and nine Noongar Wardandi people were killed and two wounded, including women and children.

A second massacre followed in July 1837. On 13 July Dawson was speared in the arm by a Wardandi warrior, and Mrs Dawson had a spear thrown at her. This would have been in retaliation to the massacre on 27 June. The Bussell brothers Charles, Lenox and Alfred then got together with the Chapmans and took various steps to retaliate and locate the suspected perpetrator, a Noongar warrior called Gaywal; including taking four Noongar women and a child hostage for a day. The young warrior who threw the spears was Knockindon, a Wardandi man whose land the Bussells were occupying. On 24 July Vernon returned from Perth with the year's rations. On 30 July shouting was heard down at the estuary, and the Bussells, Dawson and other settler men armed themselves and headed down there. They shot and killed at least six people. Bessie Bussell wrote "Three women, one man, one boy are known to be dead, but more are supposed to be dying." Three days later the Bussell brothers buried the bodies when they realised that Noongar people were not going to come back for their dead. Lenox refused to do a report on this incident to the resident magistrate John Molloy. Dawson submitted a report about his spearing instead.

During these two massacres, John Bussell was away in England seeking a wife. The other Bussell brothers Charles, Lenox and Alfred were involved. In a letter to his brother John in England, Charles Bussell wrote that "the war with the natives had been properly conducted".

In August 1837 Mr Bunbury's horse disappeared and the Bussells headed out again. (Lieut. Henry William St Pierre Bunbury had been stationed down at the Vasse, but was in York at the time.) This time an old Noongar man was shot and wounded and the child he was carrying was dropped. The Bussells kept this child as a hostage for ten weeks. Subsequently, Bunbury's horse was found.

In October 1839 Henry Camfield, a colonial settler in Perth who was looking for a wife, came down to the Vasse area to woo Fanny Bussell. During his stay there the Bussells set a trap for a Noongar man who came to steal food. They set a trap with a shotgun and the Noongar man was shot. The Bussells then rode off searching for collaborators and Camden was left to bury the body. Camden then decided against Fanny Bussell as a wife and returned to Perth.

In February 1841 a third, much more deadly, massacre – the Wonnerup massacre – took place after George Layman was killed by Wardandi warrior Gaywal. John Bussell, newly married, was back from England by then. He and Captain John Molloy led a group of settlers in a massacre of dozens of Noongar people. Charles Bussell was part of this group, and Lenox may also have been involved (although by then he was mentally very unwell). The History of West Australia, written in 1897, states that during the massacre "the white men had no mercy" and dozens of Noongar people were killed.

In 1842, Charles Bussell shot and killed a little Noongar girl called Cumangoot when questioning her about stealing flour from the family's stores. Charles was charged with manslaughter and fined one shilling, equivalent to A$6.66 in 2022.

== Correspondence archives ==
Many of the Bussells were prolific letter-writers, and much of their correspondence has been preserved. These letters provide an outstanding record of the lives of a class of settler that were largely neglected by contemporary historians and record-keepers. Consequently, they have been much studied by modern historians.

On 14 August 2007, The West Australian newspaper reported that the J S Battye Library had paid a possible Western Australian record of A$91,000, equivalent to A$131,752 in 2022, at auction for the personal diaries of Vernon Bussell, some 19,783 times what Charles Bussell was fined in 1842 for killing a child.

Members of the Bussell family include:

- Ellen Louisa Bussell
  - her first son John Bussell (1803–1875), explorer and MLC
    - his wife Charlotte Bussell (1803–1899)
    - his daughter Capel Carter Brockman (1839–1924) was named after a Miss Capel Carter, (a cousin of the Bussels in England with whom family members corresponded), after whom is named the Capel River and the town and Shire of Capel
  - her second son William Bussell (who did not emigrate with the rest of the family)
  - her third son Lenox Bussell
  - her fourth son Charles Bussell
  - her fifth son Joseph Vernon Bussell (d.1860) (known as Vernon Bussell)
    - his wife Mary Elizabeth Bussell, née Phillips
    - his son William John Bussell (1854–1936) (known as Archdeacon Bussell)
  - her sixth son Alfred Bussell (1816–1882), explorer and MLC
    - his wife Ellen Bussell (1833–1877)
    - his daughter Grace Drake-Brockman (1860–1935) of SS Georgette shipwreck fame
      - her children included: Edmund Drake-Brockman, Geoffrey Drake-Brockman and Deborah Hackett
    - his son Jack Bussell (1865–1940)
  - her first daughter Mary Bussell
  - her second daughter Frances Louisa "Fanny" Bussell
  - her third daughter Elizabeth Capel "Bessie" Bussell

== General references ==
- Shann, Edward O. G. (1978) [1926]. Cattle Chosen. Nedlands, Western Australia: University of Western Australia Press. ISBN 0-85564-138-X.
- Shann, E. O. G. (8 March 2024) [1926]. Cattle Chosen: the Story of the First Group Settlement in Western Australia 1829 to 1841 . London: Oxford University Press – via Wikisource.
- Hardwick, Gil (2003). Castle Dangerous: The Alfred Pickmore Bussell Estate, Margaret River, Western Australia. Perth, Western Australia: Hesperian Press. ISBN 0-85905-322-9.
