= Wonnerup, Western Australia =

Wonnerup
- Town
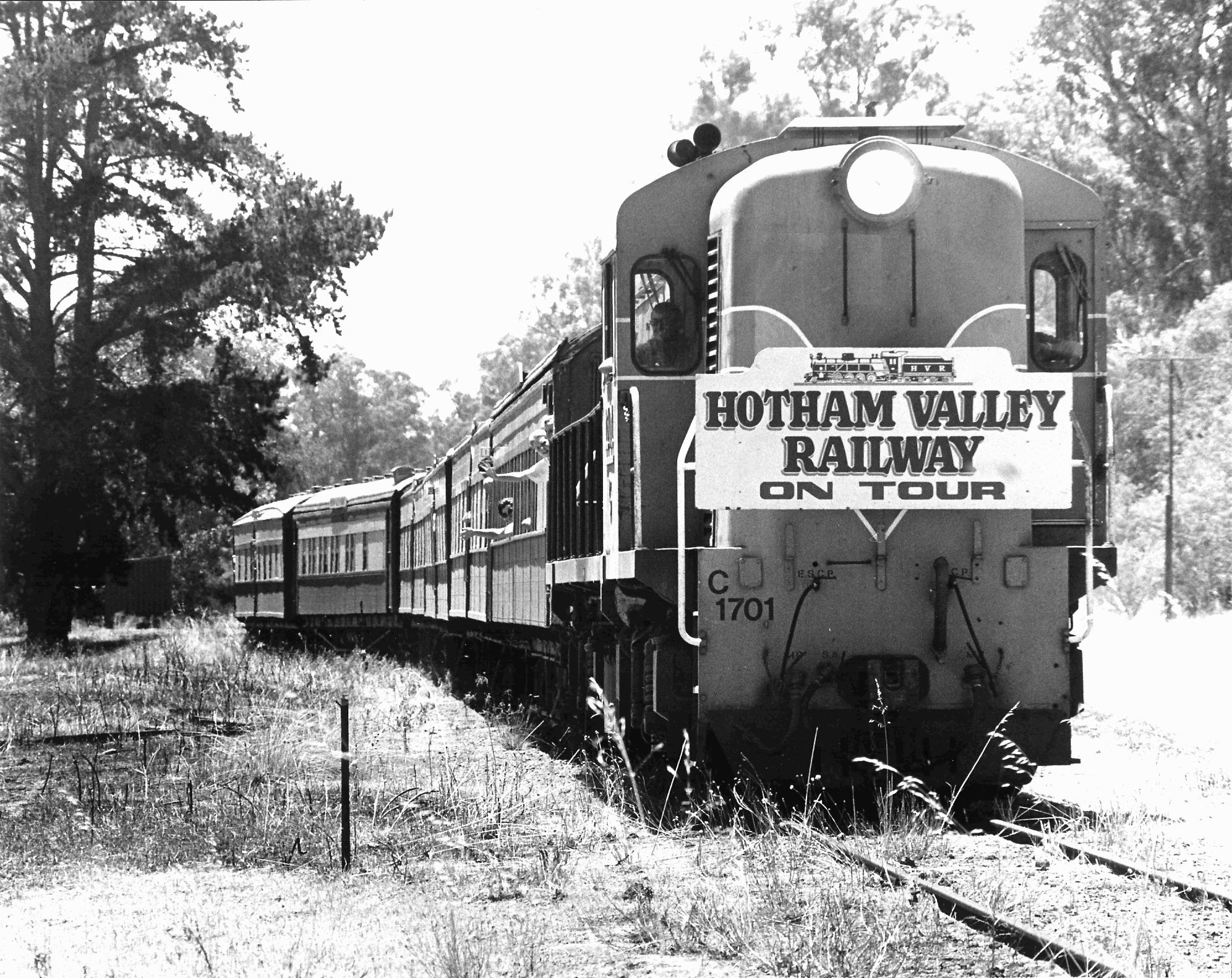
- The last passenger train to Busselton passing through Wonnerup in January 1987

- Interactive map of Wonnerup
- Coordinates: 33.62°S 115.4°E
- Country: Australia
- State: Western Australia
- LGA: City of Busselton
- Location: 219 km (136 mi) S of Perth; 10 km (6.2 mi) E of Busselton
- Established: 1856

Government
  - State electorate: Vasse
  - Federal division: Forrest

Area
  - Total: 17.6 km^{2} (6.8 sq mi)
- Elevation: 94 m (308 ft)

Population
  - Total: 196 (SAL 2021)
- Postcode: 6280

The townsite of Wonnerup is located 219 kilometres (136 mi) south of Perth and 10 kilometres (6 mi) east of Busselton. It was gazetted a townsite in 1856, deriving its name from the nearby Wonnerup Inlet.

The name is Aboriginal, and has been shown on maps of the region since 1839. The meaning of the name is 'place of the woman's digging or fighting stick'; the Noongar word for fighting stick is wonna, while the suffix -up denotes 'place of'. The wonna was made from the peppermint tree, Agonis flexuosa, a coastal native found only in the south-west, and was a common trade item of the Noongar people.

The Wonnerup massacre of Wardandi Noongar people by European settlers occurred in the vicinity of the area in 1841. The Ballaarat tramline, Western Australia's first railway and railway bridge, was constructed in 1871 in the locality of Lockville, within Wonnerup. Wonnerup was later the junction of the Bunbury to Busselton railway line and the Nannup branch railway. In 1998, part of Wonnerup was subsumed into the Busselton suburb of Geographe.

Ballaarat locomotive in the sand at Wonnerup on 27 March 1921

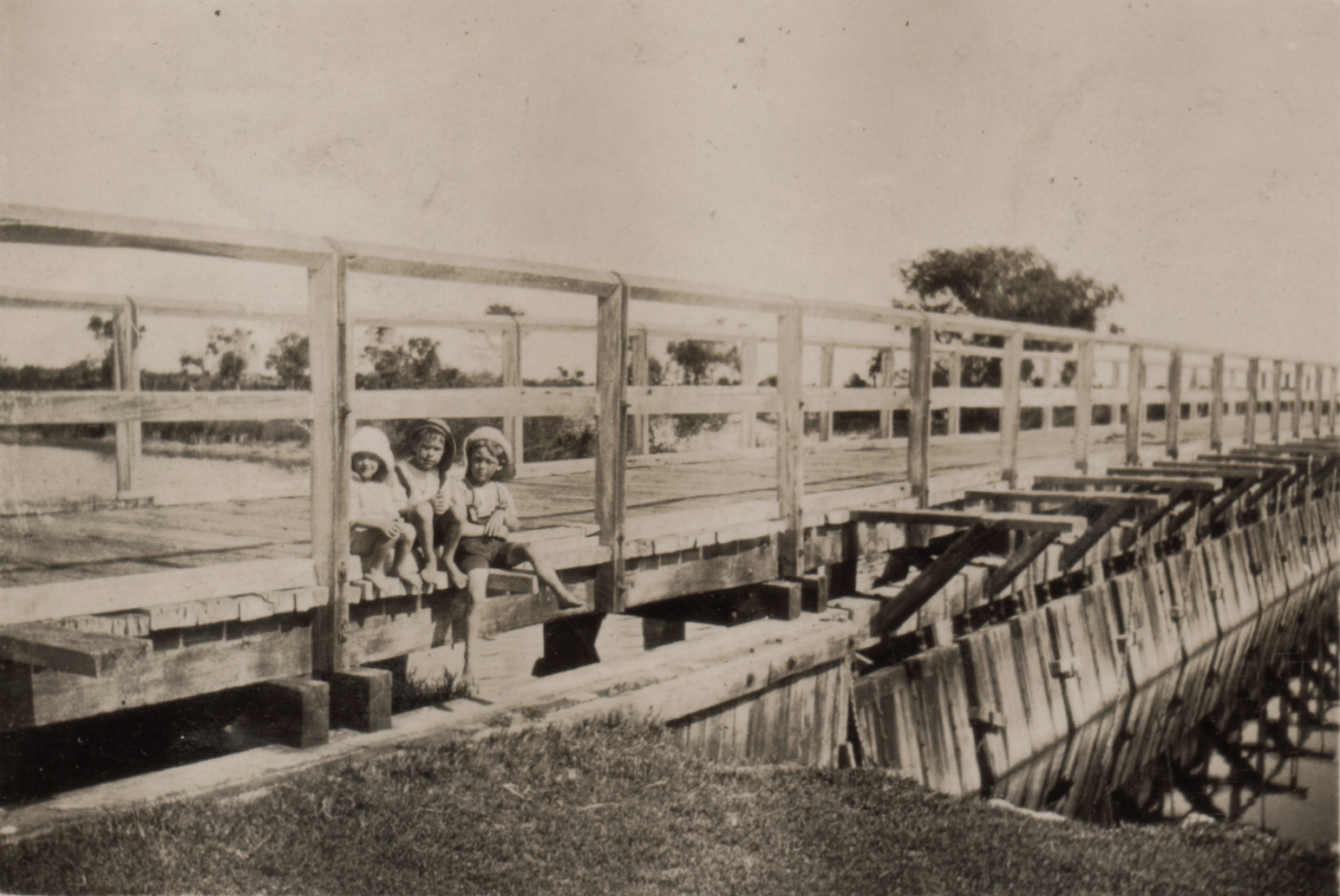
Bridge at Wonnerup, Western Australia

== See also ==
- Wonnerup House
