= John Molloy (Australian settler) =

Early settler of Western Australia

Captain John Molloy (5 September 1786 – 6 October 1867) was an early Irish settler in Western Australia. He was one of the original settlers of Augusta and an early settler of Busselton.

== Early life ==
The outline of John Molloy's birth and early life are believed to be clear, though there is little detail and published accounts vary greatly. It is possible that he was the same John Molloy who was baptised at St Martin-in-the-Fields in London, on 8 October 1786, the son of William and Mary Molloy. (Note: St Martin in the Fields parish register.) As John celebrated his birthday on 5 September in later life, his birth date may have been 5 September 1786.

This William Molloy had a shoe warehouse at 16 High St, St Giles, London. He made his will in 1804, leaving bequests to his son, John, and his daughter, Susanna, who were to inherit their shares of the estate when they reached the age of 21. The will also stipulates regular payments from the estate to William Molloy's mother, who was living in King's County, Ireland. St Giles was well known as a quarter where Irish tradesmen settled. William Molloy died in December 1804.

John Molloy was able to buy a commission in the Rifle Brigade on 17 December 1807, just over three months after his 21st birthday, when he came into his inheritance. He fought in the Peninsular War of 1808–10 and was promoted to lieutenant in 1809. Then, during a two-year break in military engagements, he attended the Royal Military College, at Great Marlow. From 1812 to 1814, he fought in the Napoleonic Wars under Wellington, taking part in eight battles. In 1815 he fought at Waterloo where he was badly wounded and received the Waterloo Medal. After recovering his health, he returned to active duty, being posted to Glasgow in 1819–20, then Ireland until 1825. In 1824 he was promoted to captain.

== Emigration to Western Australia ==
On 6 August 1829, Molloy married Georgiana Kennedy, and began to consider emigrating to Western Australia. The Molloys eventually sailed for Western Australia on board Warrior in October 1829. On arriving at the Swan River Colony in March 1830, Molloy was advised by Governor Stirling that the best land in the area had already been granted. Stirling suggested instead that the Molloys join with some other newly arrived settlers in forming a subcolony in the vicinity of Cape Leeuwin. Late in April, a group of prospective settlers including the Molloys and Bussells accompanied Stirling and his official party to the proposed site of the subcolony. After a four-day exploratory expedition up the Blackwood River, Stirling confirmed his decision to establish a settlement at the location. The settlers' possessions were unloaded, and Molloy was appointed Government Resident and resident magistrate for the settlement, to be called Augusta.

== Settlement at Augusta and move to Busselton ==
For the first few years of the settlement, Molloy's main tasks, other than establishment of his own farm, were the allocation of land, and laying out of the townsite. When Molloy named the streets and coastal features of Augusta in 1832, he chose the names and titles of Prince Frederick, Duke of York and Albany, who had died five years previously: Osnaburg Street, York Street, Albany Terrace, Duke's Head and Point Frederick.

In 1839 he moved to Busselton, and began to work on building a 12,000-acre (4,900 ha) property called Fair Lawn in what is now Bovell. He became the town's first magistrate, which he found more complicated than at Augusta because of the presence of American whalers and difficult relationships with the Indigenous Australians.

== Massacre on Wardandi country ==
In 1841 Molloy led a massacre of Wardandi Noongar people in reprisal for the spearing of George Layman. The massacre took place over several days, with around seven people killed initially. This was reported in the Perth Gazette in March 1841. Molloy was joined by two Bussell brothers, and Frances Bussell noted in her diary on 27 February: "Captain Molloy drank tea here. 7 natives killed." Molloy subsequently led his soldiers and colonial settlers including the Bussell brothers in a further massacre over a number of days, starting out with isolated killings and then a mass shooting of dozens of Wardandi Noongar people at Lake Minninup. Molloy gave orders that women and children should be spared, but no mercy should be shown to the men. Noongar oral history remembers that "the white men's guns were too many so some of the Aboriginals got away but they were rounded up and shot north of Capel River". Georgiana Molloy's incomplete collection of writings does not mention her husband's activities and the massacre was not reported in detail by Captain Molloy to authorities.

== Later life ==
When his wife died in 1843, he stayed on at Busselton. In 1850, he visited England, returning to Western Australia in 1852. On his return, he continued as Busselton's magistrate, dealing with the arrival of convicts. In 1859 he transferred to the 9th Foot and was promoted to major and lieutenant-colonel, but sold the commission the same day. He resigned as Government Resident in March 1851 on the grounds of old age. From 1860 on, he gradually turned over management of his property to Richard Gale. He died on 6 October 1867, and was buried alongside his wife. The age given on Molloy's grave, 87, is inaccurate: it should be 81. (Note: The date of Molloy's baptism and his father's will both suggest an age of 87 is highly unlikely. If 87 in 1867, John would have been about 24 in 1804 when his father's will mentions him as under 21.)

Molloy's eldest daughter Sabina married Matthew Blagden Hale, who became the first Anglican Bishop of Perth. Another daughter Flora married William Locke Brockman.

== General references ==
- Barry, Bernice (2015). Georgiana Molloy: the mind that shines. Redgate Consultants. ISBN 978-0-9942064-0-4.
- Hardwick, Gil (2000). "The Irish RM: Capt. John Molloy of the Vasse". Centre for Western Australian History, Department of History. Studies in Western Australian History. The Irish in Western Australia. 20. Nedlands: University of Western Australia. ISBN 0-86422-929-1.
- Hasluck, Alexandra (1955). Portrait with Background: A Life of Georgiana Molloy. Melbourne: Oxford University Press.
- Stirling, James (1830). Government Notice - Journal of an excursion to Cape Lewin, April 1830 – via Wikisource.
