= Stokes Inlet =

Inlet on south coast of Western Australia

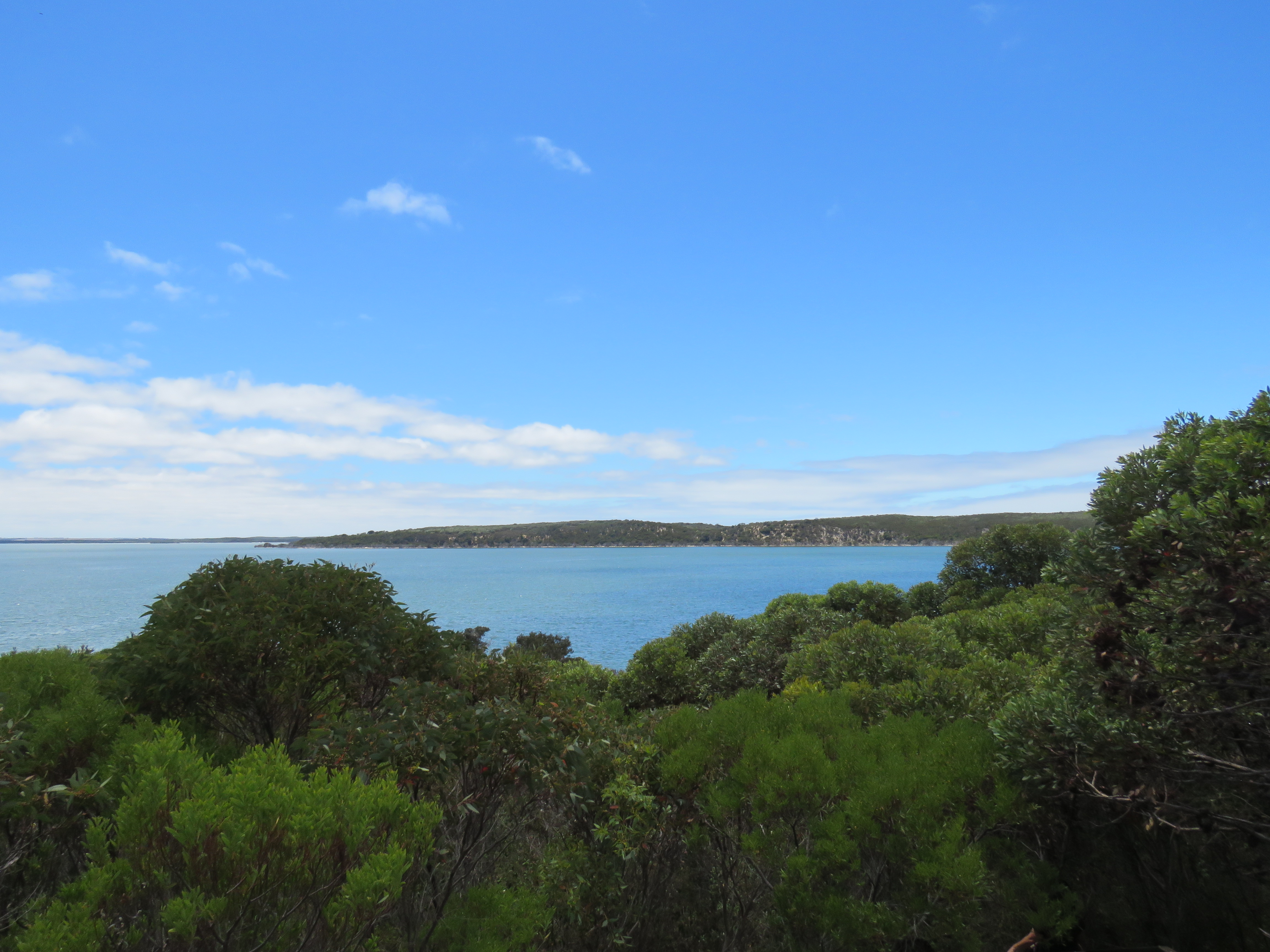
- The inlet seen from the lookout at the Stokes Inlet Picnic Area

- Interactive map of Stokes Inlet
- Coordinates: 33°49′11″S 121°9′39″E
- Country: Australia
- State: Western Australia
- LGA: Shire of Esperance

Stokes Inlet is an inlet in the Goldfields-Esperance region of Western Australia.

The inlet is situated 65 kilometres (40 mi) west of Esperance in Stokes National Park and is set is a large river valley with permanent deep water and high dunes located on either side. Thick bushland and paperbark trees surround the inlet and grow down to the waters edge. It is in a largely unmodified condition. The inlet functions primarily as a result of wave energy and is a wave dominated estuary.

Stokes Inlet was named in 1848 by John Septimus Roe, the Surveyor General of Western Australia, while leading a five-man exploration expedition along the coast, commemorating John Lort Stokes' work on HMS Beagle, surveying the Western Australian coast.

== Geography ==
The inlet is managed by the Department of Environment and Conservation with a catchment that extends over 100 kilometres (62 mi) inland and is fed by two main rivers, the Young and Lort Rivers. The inlet itself is 10 kilometres (6 mi) long and 2 kilometres (1 mi) wide with an area of 14 square kilometres (5 sq mi), and receives an annual flow of 5 million cubic metres. The central basin has an area of 8.6 square kilometres (3 sq mi) with intertidal flats having an area of approximately 2 square kilometres (1 sq mi).

The mouth of the river is in the middle of Dunster Castle Bay; it is closed by a sandbar that cuts the estuary off from the sea and only opens every few years. As a result, the salinity and water level fluctuate greatly dependent upon the amount of evaporation and river flow.

== Flora ==
The aquatic flora of the estuary are dominated by the small green algae Polyphysa peniculus, the stonewort Lamprothamnium papulosum, and the seagrass Ruppia megacarpa. The waterbody of the inlet is fringed with salt water paperbarks with sedges and samphire common along the sandy sections.

== Fauna ==
Marine species flourish at times when the bar is open; blue manna crabs, juvenile prawns, cockles and mussels have all been identified in the inlet. Many fish species inhabit the estuary, such as the common minnow, hardyheads, gobies, and larger species such as black bream and sea mullet.
