= Persoonia flexifolia =

Conservation status
- Priority One — Poorly Known Taxa (DEC)

Scientific classification
- Kingdom: Plantae
- Clade: Tracheophytes
- Clade: Angiosperms
- Clade: Eudicots
- Order: Proteales
- Family: Proteaceae
- Genus: Persoonia
- Species: P. flexifolia

Binomial name
- Persoonia flexifolia R.Br.

Species of shrub

Persoonia flexifolia is a plant in the family Proteaceae and is endemic to the south-west of Western Australia. It is an erect shrub with narrow oblong leaves and flowers arranged singly or in groups of up to three on a rachis up to 4 mm (0.16 in) long.

== Description ==
Persoonia flexifolia is an erect shrub with its young branchlets covered with whitish or greyish hairs. The leaves are mostly narrow oblong, 10–25 mm (0.39–0.98 in) long and 1.8–3 mm (0.071–0.118 in) wide and usually twisted through 90–180°. The flowers are arranged singly, in pairs or threes along a rachis up to 4 mm (0.16 in) long that grows into a leafy shoot after flowering, each flower on a pedicel 1.5–3 mm (0.059–0.118 in) long. The tepals are narrow oblong, 10–12 mm (0.39–0.47 in) long and glabrous on the outside with anthers that curve outwards near the tips. Flowering occurs from December to January.

== Taxonomy ==
Persoonia flexifolia was first formally described in 1810 by Robert Brown in Transactions of the Linnean Society of London.

== Distribution and habitat ==
This geebung is only known from collections made at Lucky Bay and the Lort River in the Esperance Plains biogeographic region where it was growing in low heath.

== Conservation status ==
Persoonia flexifolia is classified as "Priority One" by the Government of Western Australia Department of Parks and Wildlife, meaning that it is known from only one or a few locations which are potentially at risk.
