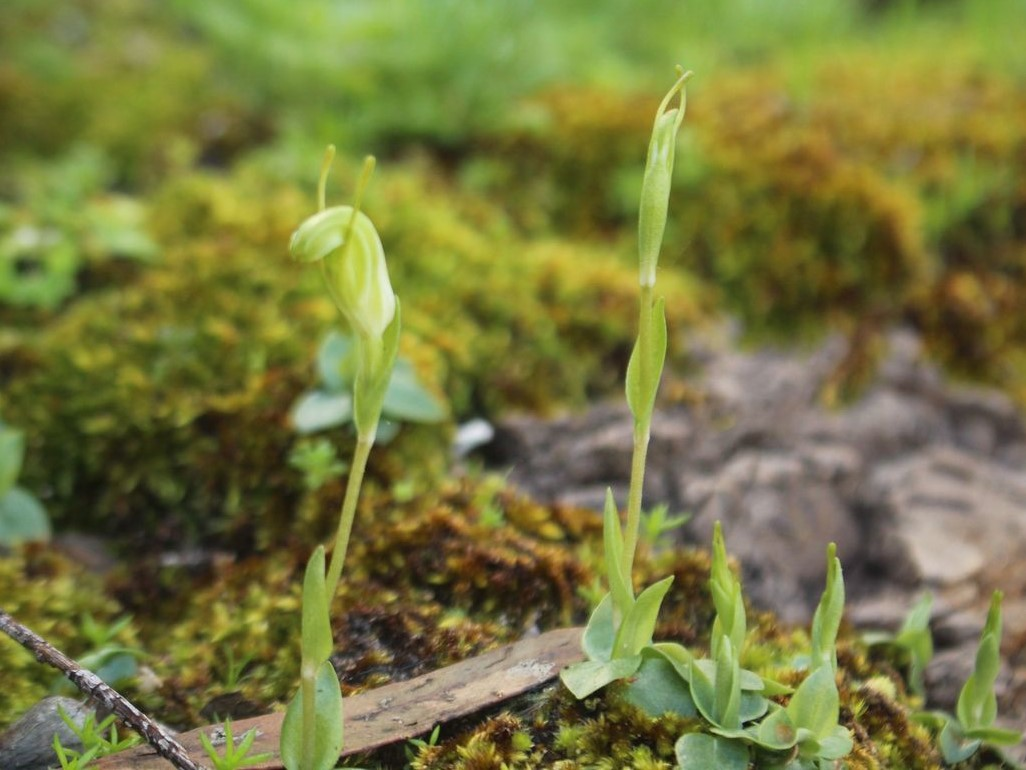

Scientific classification
- Kingdom: Plantae
- Clade: Tracheophytes
- Clade: Angiosperms
- Clade: Monocots
- Order: Asparagales
- Family: Orchidaceae
- Subfamily: Orchidoideae
- Tribe: Cranichideae
- Genus: Pterostylis
- Species: P. lortensis

Binomial name
- Pterostylis lortensis D.L.Jones & C.J.French

Synonyms
- Diplodium lortensis (D.L.Jones & C.J.French) D.L.Jones & M.A.Clem.

= Pterostylis lortensis =

Lort River snail orchid

Species of orchid

Pterostylis lortensis, commonly known as the Lort River snail orchid, is a species of orchid endemic to the south-west of Western Australia. Non-flowering plants have a rosette of leaves flat on the ground but flowering plants usually lack a rosette and have a flowering stem with leaves and a single pale green and white flower with narrow, club-like lateral sepals.

== Description ==
Pterostylis lortensis is a terrestrial, perennial, deciduous, herb with an underground tuber. Non-flowering plants have a rosette of leaves 20–30 mm (0.8–1 in) in diameter. Flowering plants lack a rosette but have a single pale green and white flower 11–13 mm (0.4–0.5 in) long and 3–6 mm (0.1–0.2 in) wide on a flowering stem 40–140 mm (2–6 in) high. There are between three and five leaves 10–25 mm (0.4–1 in) long and 5–14 mm (0.2–0.6 in) wide on the flowering stem. The dorsal sepal and petals are fused, forming a hood or "galea" over the column, the dorsal sepal with a blunt tip. The lateral sepals are held close to the galea, almost close off the front of the flower and have erect, tips 7–9 mm (0.3–0.4 in) long which have slightly thickened, club-like tips. The labellum is relatively small but is not visible from outside the flower. Flowering occurs from August to September.

== Taxonomy and naming ==
Pterostylis lortensis was first formally described in 2014 by David Jones and Christopher French from a specimen collected near the Lort River and the description was published in Australian Orchid Review. The species had previously been known as Pterostylis sp. 'south coast clubbed sepals'. The specific epithet (lortensis) refers to the Lort River where the type specimen was collected.

== Distribution and habitat ==
The Lort River snail orchid usually grows in winter-wet places, often amongst sedges. It occurs between Boxwood Hill and Israelite Bay in the Esperance Plains biogeographic region.

== Conservation ==
Pterostylis lortensis is listed as "not threatened" by the Government of Western Australia Department of Parks and Wildlife.
