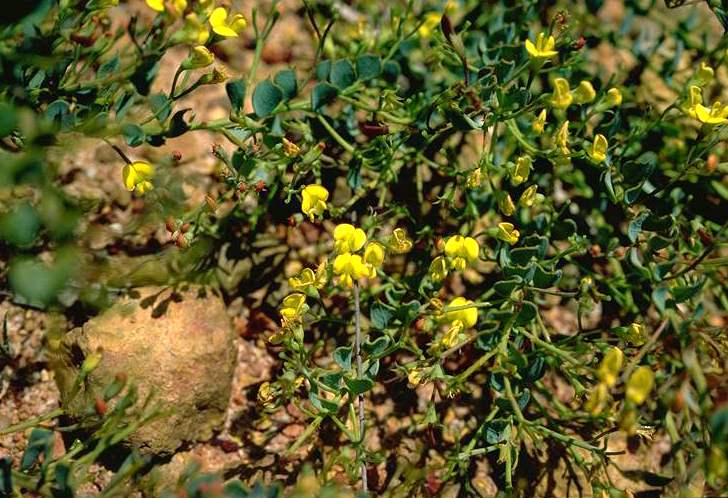
- Near Lake King

Scientific classification
- Kingdom: Plantae
- Clade: Tracheophytes
- Clade: Angiosperms
- Clade: Eudicots
- Clade: Rosids
- Order: Fabales
- Family: Fabaceae
- Subfamily: Faboideae
- Genus: Daviesia
- Species: D. lancifolia

Binomial name
- Daviesia lancifolia Turcz.

Synonyms
- Daviesia mollis var. minor Benth.; Daviesia pedunculata var. minor Meisn.

= Daviesia lancifolia =

Species of flowering plant

Daviesia lancifolia is a species of flowering plant in the family Fabaceae and is endemic to the south-west of Western Australia. It is a prostrate to erect, spreading shrub with egg-shaped, more or less round or linear phyllodes and yellow to orange and red flowers.

== Description ==
Daviesia lancifolia is a glabrous, prostrate to erect and spreading shrub that typically grows up to 0.5 m (1 ft 8 in) high and 1 m (3 ft 3 in) wide, its foliage usually covered with silky hairs. Its phyllodes are scattered, egg-shaped, more or less round or linear, mostly 7–17 mm (0.28–0.67 in) long, 2–11 mm (0.079–0.433 in) wide with a pointed tip, sometimes sharply so. The flowers are arranged in one or two clusters of three to five in leaf axils on a peduncle 9–31 mm (0.35–1.22 in) long, the rachis up to 4 mm (0.16 in) long, each flower on a pedicel 3–7 mm (0.12–0.28 in) long. The sepals are 3–4 mm (0.12–0.16 in) long and joined at the base, the upper two joined for most of their length and the lower three triangular and about 2 mm (0.079 in) long. The standard petal is broadly egg-shaped, 6–7 mm (0.24–0.28 in) long and mostly yellow to pale orange, the wings 6–7 mm (0.24–0.28 in) long and yellow to red, and the keel 5.5–7.5 mm (0.22–0.30 in) long and yellow to red. Flowering occurs from October to March and the fruit is broadly triangular pod 8–9 mm (0.31–0.35 in) long.

== Taxonomy and naming ==
Daviesia lancifolia was first formally described in 1853 by Nikolai Turczaninow in the Bulletin de la Société Impériale des Naturalistes de Moscou. The specific epithet (lancifolia) means "lance-leaved".

== Distribution and habitat ==
This species of Daviesia grows in heath and mallee shrubland between Narrogin, the Stirling Range, Hyden and the Cape Arid National Park in the Avon Wheatbelt, Esperance Plains, Jarrah Forest and Mallee biogeographic regions of south-western Western Australia.

== Conservation status ==
Daviesia lancifolia is listed as "not threatened" by the Department of Biodiversity, Conservation and Attractions.
