= John Lort Stokes =

Welsh Royal Navy Admiral, sailed with Charles Darwin (1811–1885)

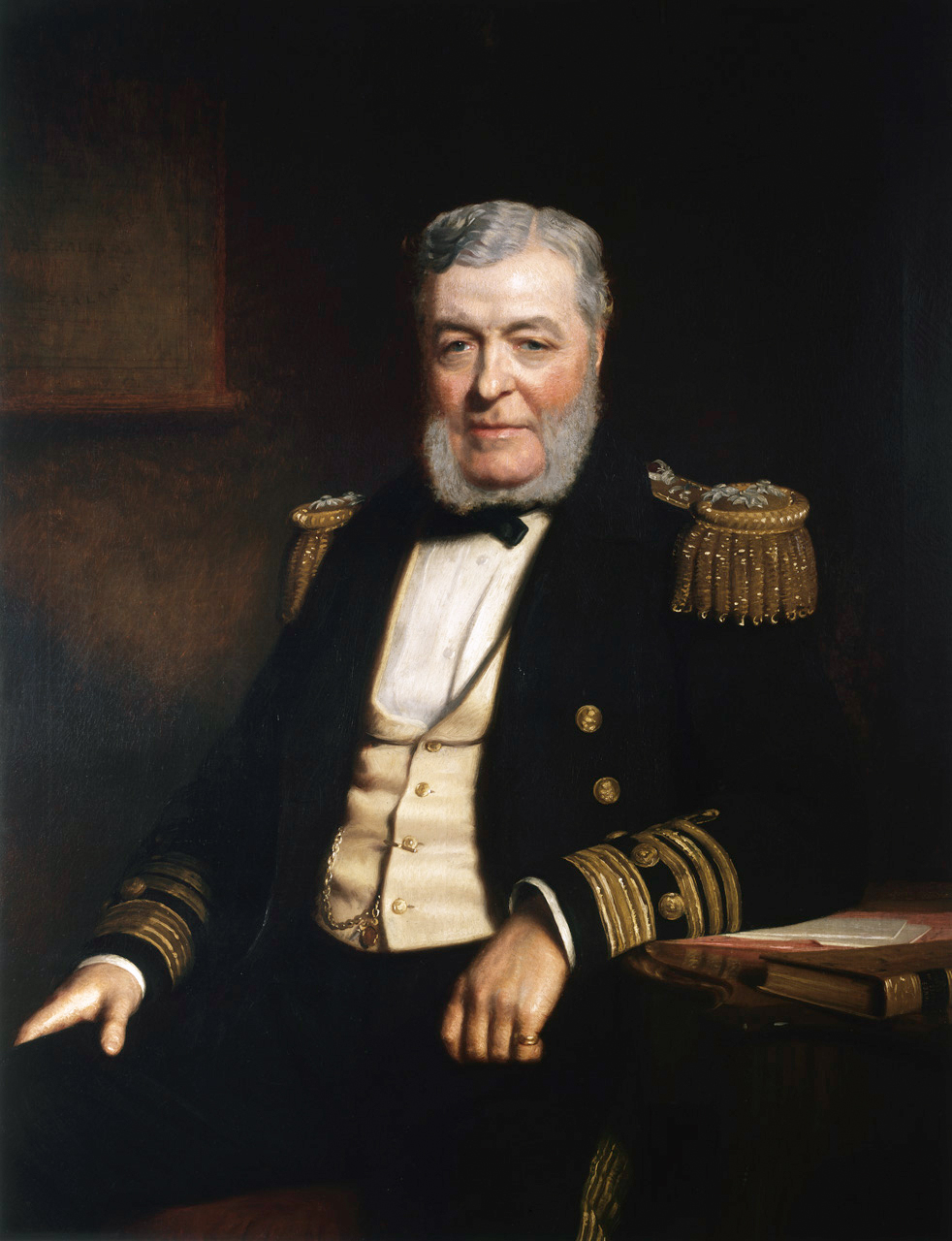
A portrait of Stokes by Stephen Pearce

Admiral John Lort Stokes (1 August 1811 – 11 June 1885) was a Royal Navy officer who served onboard HMS Beagle for almost eighteen years. (Note: Although 1812 is frequently given as Stokes's year of birth, it has been argued by author Marsden Hordern that Stokes was born in 1811, citing a letter by fellow naval officer Crawford Pasco congratulating him on his birthday in 1852.)

== Biography ==
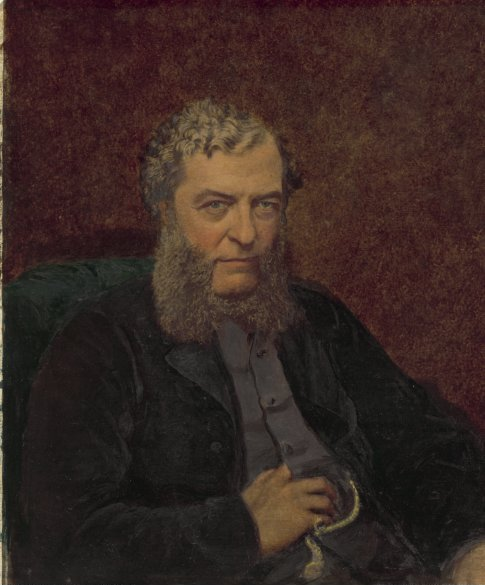
John Lort Stokes in 1864

Born on 1 August 1811, son of Henry Stokes, of Scotchwell, near Haverfordwest, Pembrokeshire, and Anne, daughter of Dr George Phillips, Stokes joined the Royal Navy on 20 September 1824. The first ship he served on was HMS Prince Regent, and then in October 1825 he joined the crew of Beagle under Captain Phillip Parker King. Beagle was involved in a survey of the waters of South America. In 1828 the commander of HMS Beagle, Pringle Stokes (not related to John Lort Stokes), committed suicide and Robert FitzRoy assumed command; the ship returned to England in 1830 and was recommissioned.

From 1831 to 1836 Stokes served under FitzRoy as assistant surveyor for the second voyage of HMS Beagle, and shared his cabin with Charles Darwin who was on board in a private capacity as a self-funded naturalist.

Following this, Stokes was promoted to the rank of lieutenant, and served under Commander John Clements Wickham for a survey of Australasian waters. When Wickham was invalided in 1841, Stokes took command of the ship. While Stokes was in command, Beagle surveyed Timor and New Zealand, returning to England in 1843. When he returned he wrote an account of this voyage of the Beagle, which was published in 1846 in two volumes.

In July 1846 Stokes was promoted to captain and commanded the steamship HMS Acheron surveying New Zealand for four years. This was one of 26 hydrography surveys conducted by the British Hydrography Office around the world, and was also tasked with investigating natural resources and negotiating between British settlers and the Māori inhabitants of New Zealand. Due to budget cuts, Acheron was replaced by a smaller vessel, HMS Pandora from 1851 to 1856. The charts produced by Stokes remain in use to this day.

From 1860 to 1863 Stokes commanded the ship HMS Rose, surveying the coasts of the English Channel. He retired in 1863, was promoted to the rank of rear admiral in 1863, vice-admiral in 1871 and admiral in 1877. He died on 11 June 1885 at his home in Scotchwell.

== Legacy ==
Stokes is commemorated in the scientific name of two species of reptiles: Astrotia stokesii and Egernia stokesii.

In 1848 Stokes Inlet and Lort River on the south coast of Western Australia were named by John Septimus Roe the Surveyor General of Western Australia while leading a five-man exploration expedition, commemorating Stokes' work on Beagle surveying the Western Australian coast.

Examples of charts from Stokes's surveys
Bass Strait, surveyed by Stokes in the Beagle 1843

Auckland Harbour, Surveyed by Stokes and Commander B. Drury in Acheron, 1849-1855

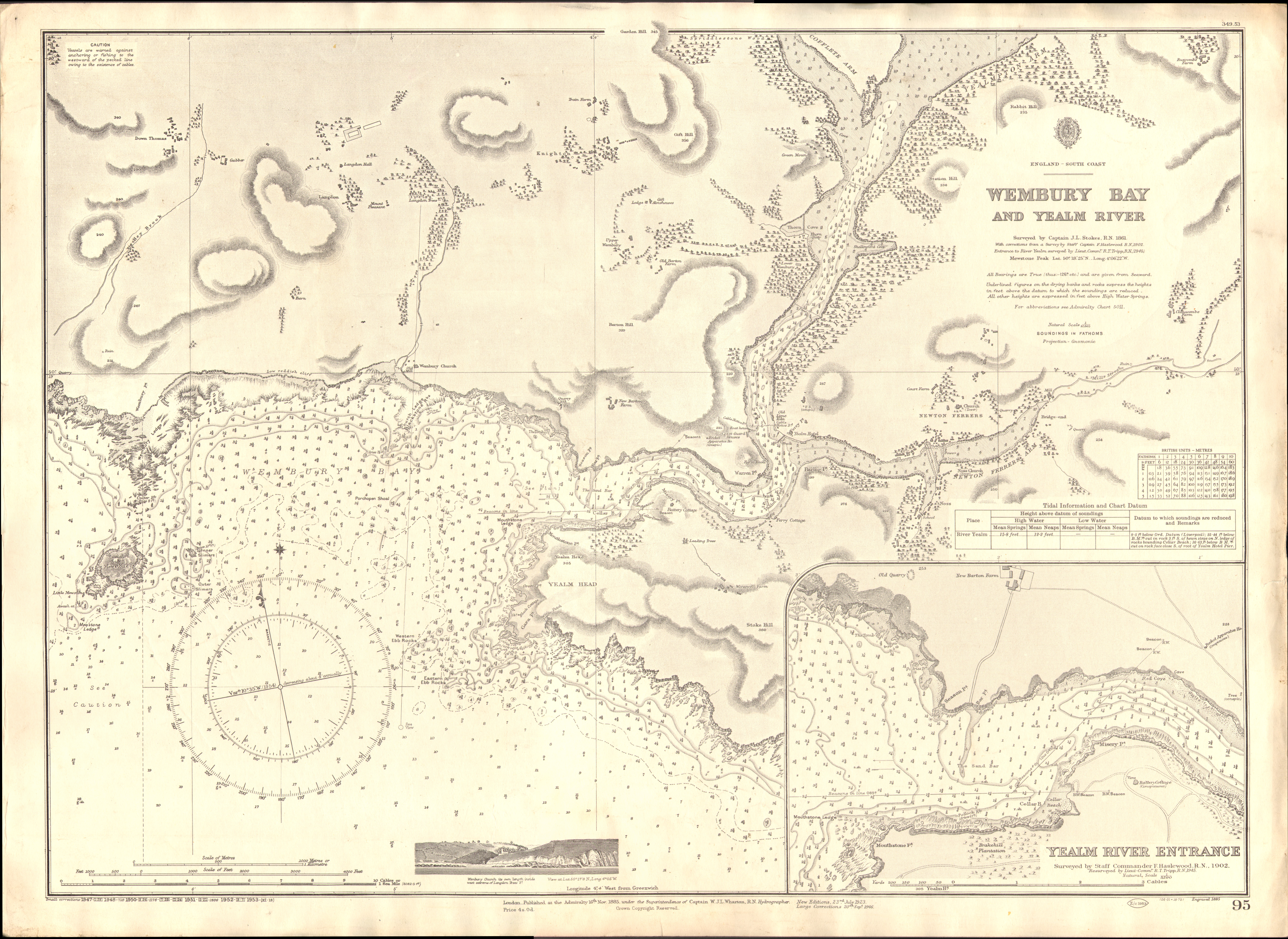
Wembury Bay and Yealm River, Devon, Surveyed by Stokes in 1861
