= Wallace Vernon Fyfe =

Australian geographer

- Born: 1894; Australia
- Died: 1982 (aged 87–88)
- Occupation: Geographer

Wallace Vernon Fyfe (1894 - 1982) was an Australian geographer who served as the Surveyor General of Western Australia from 1938 to 1945.

== Biography ==
He was born at Albert Park, Victoria on 7 April 1894. He was the second of four children born to Alexander Parker Fyfe, and his wife Marion, née Howard.

He was married to Venetia Thompson (1892 - 1975), a tennis player.

He died on 17 January 1982 and was survived by his two daughters.

== Career ==
=== Military Service ===
He served in the Australian Infantry Battalion of the Australian Army during the World War One. He reached the rank of private and served in France.

He also worked for the Commonwealth Public Service.

=== Surveyor ===
In 1910, he was apprenticed to the surveyor Marmaduke Terry.

He became a licensed surveyor on 21 October 1919.

He was a member of the Institution of Surveyors of Western Australia.

He became the director of land settlement in Western Australia in 1945.

He retired on 7 April 1959 and was succeeded by Harold Camm as the Surveyor General of Western Australia.

== Bibliography ==
His notable books include:

- Land laws and tenures : supplementary report on the investigation of the laws relating to the alienation and leasing of agricultural and grazing land owned by the Crown in each of the states of Australia, Australian Capital Territory and the Northern Territory
- Western Australia, 1954
- Report of the Royal Commission Appointed to Inquire into and Report upon the Financial and Economic Position of the Pastoral Industry in the Leasehold Areas in Western Australia together with appendices and minutes of evidence
- The valuation of agricultural and grazing land in Australia for land settlement and government financial authorities and for taxation and rating purposes : 1948 supplementary report
- Outline of the history of the Western Australian Division of the Commonwealth Institute of Valuers, 1926-1974
- War Service Land Settlement W.A. : comments on report of Committee of Enquiry
- Supplementary report on the main country land valuation systems in Australia

== See also ==
- List of pastoral leases in Western Australia
- Surveyor General of Western Australia
