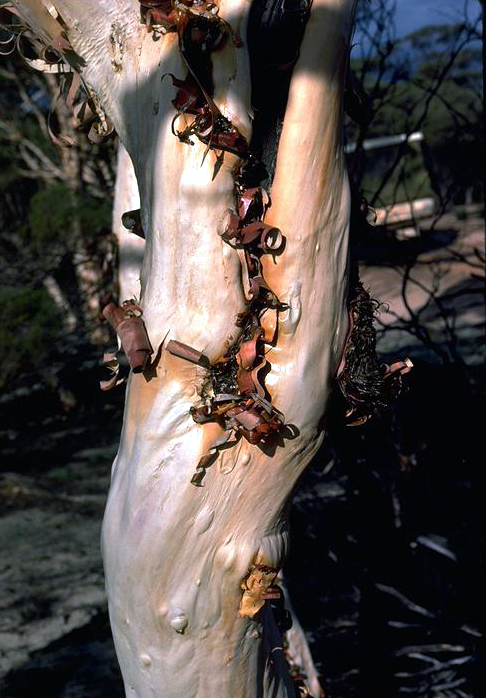
- Melaleuca exuvia bark

Scientific classification
- Kingdom: Plantae
- Clade: Tracheophytes
- Clade: Angiosperms
- Clade: Eudicots
- Clade: Rosids
- Order: Myrtales
- Family: Myrtaceae
- Genus: Melaleuca
- Species: M. exuvia

Binomial name
- Melaleuca exuvia Craven & Lepschi

= Melaleuca exuvia =

Species of flowering plant

Melaleuca exuvia is a plant in the myrtle family, Myrtaceae and is endemic to the south of Western Australia. It is easily distinguished by its unusual rough, minni ritchi bark which peels to reveal a new layer of smooth, salmon-pink bark. It is a newly described (2004) species which was formerly included in Melaleuca uncinata.

== Description ==
Melaleuca exuvia is a large shrub growing to 6 m (20 ft) tall with rough, pinkish-grey bark which peels annually in a pattern known as minni ritchi to reveal new, smooth salmon-pink bark. It often has more than one stem and a crown up to 9 m (30 ft) across. Its leaves are erect, cylinder-shaped, linear to narrow elliptic and circular in cross-section, narrowing to a usually hooked end. They are 7–30 mm (0.3–1 in) long and 0.6–1.3 mm (0.02–0.05 in) in diameter.

The flowers are white to yellow and arranged in heads containing 3 to 8 groups of flowers in threes. The petals are oval in shape, 1–1.4 mm (0.04–0.06 in) long and the stamens are arranged in five bundles around the flower, each bundle containing 5 to 8 stamens. Flowering occurs in late spring and is followed by fruit which are woody capsules 4.5–5 mm (0.18–0.20 in) long, often retained on the stems for many years.

== Taxonomy and naming ==
The first formal description of this plant was made in 2004 by Lyndley Craven and Brendan Lepschi in Australian Systematic Botany from a specimen found at Key Rocks near Norseman. The specific epithet (exuvia) is from the Latin word meaning "cast skin" or "slough", referring to the unusual way this species sheds its bark.

== Distribution and habitat ==
This melaleuca occurs in a small area in and between the Lort River, Lake Johnson and Queen Victoria Spring districts in the Coolgardie, Great Victoria Desert and Mallee biogeographic regions, growing sandy soils near drainage channels and the edge of salt lakes.

== Conservation status ==
Melaleuca exuvia is listed as not threatened by the Government of Western Australia Department of Parks and Wildlife.
