= Young River (Western Australia) =

River in Western Australia

Coordinates: 33°47′33.41″S 121°10′15.62″E

Location
- Country: Australia

Physical characteristics
- Source
  - elevation: 252 metres (827 ft)
- Mouth
  - location: Stokes Inlet
- Length: 95 kilometres (59 mi)
- Basin size: 2,073 km^{2} (800 sq mi)
- Discharge
  - average: 4,700 ML/a (0.15 m^{3}/s; 5.3 cu ft/s)

The Young River is a river on the south coast of Western Australia that rises south of the Frank Hann National Park then flows in a south easterly direction for a distance of 95 kilometres (59 mi) before flowing into Stokes Inlet, which discharges into the Southern Ocean.

It is also passes through the Stokes National Park.

The only two tributaries to the river are Cascade Creek and Yerritup Creek.

== History ==
The area around the Young River were used by Aboriginal people as a travel route through the region. The river provides some permanent water-pools along its course in an otherwise semi-arid landscape. Many freshwater soaks exist along the banks of the river that acted as popular camp-sites. Six known sites exist along the water course, with several stone artefacts being found. The Young River is thought to be the boundary between two Aboriginal peoples, the Wudjaarri in the west and the Nyungarra to the east.

John Septimus Roe, the Surveyor General, named the river after the Governor of South Australia while on expedition in the area in 1835.

Since the 1950s it is estimated that approximately 60% of the land has been cleared in the Young River catchment area for agricultural purposes.

The Department of the Environment installed four gauging stations along the river, the first in 1970, to measure discharge and water quality.
