= Pultenaea indira =

Scientific classification
- Kingdom: Plantae
- Clade: Tracheophytes
- Clade: Angiosperms
- Clade: Eudicots
- Clade: Rosids
- Order: Fabales
- Family: Fabaceae
- Subfamily: Faboideae
- Genus: Pultenaea
- Species: P. indira

Binomial name
- Pultenaea indira Orthia & Crisp

Species of flowering plant

Pultenaea indira is a species of flowering plant in the family Fabaceae and is endemic to the south-west of Western Australia. It is an erect or low-lying shrub characterised by plate-like or fissured bark near the base, densely hairy stems above, and linear to lance-shaped leaves with the narrower end towards the base, and yellow, red and maroon flowers.

== Description ==
Pultenaea indira is an erect or low-lying shrub that typically grows up to 10–60 cm (3.9–23.6 in) high and 20–45 cm (7.9–17.7 in) wide with plate-like or fissured barkat the base densely hairy stems. The leaves are linear to lance-shaped with the narrower end towards the base, 5.3–14.5 mm (0.21–0.57 in) long and 0.6–1.1 mm (0.024–0.043 in) wide with brownish stipules 4.0–5.3 mm (0.16–0.21 in) long at the base. The flowers are arranged singly in clusters of six to twelve and are sessile with brownish bracts 4.0–6.0 mm (0.16–0.24 in) long at the base. The five sepals are joined at the base, forming a tube 2.5–4.0 mm (0.098–0.157 in) long with lobes 0.5–1.0 mm (0.020–0.039 in) long. The standard petal is yellow to orange with dark markings, 7.3–10.2 mm (0.29–0.40 in) long and 5.0–7.0 mm (0.20–0.28 in) wide, the wings are yellow to orange and 6.6–8.5 mm (0.26–0.33 in) long and the keel blackish-red or maroon and 6.3–9.5 mm (0.25–0.37 in) long. Flowering occurs from August to November and the fruit is an egg-shaped pod 4.0–6.0 mm (0.16–0.24 in) long.

== Taxonomy and naming ==
Pultenaea indira was first formally described in 2005 by Lindy A. Orthia and Michael Crisp in the journal Nuytsia from specimens collected by Margaret G. Corrick in Cape Arid National Park in 1985. The specific epithet (indira) honours "the Australian weed ecologist and environmental activist, Indira Narayan".

In the same paper, Orthia and Crisp described three subspecies, and the names are accepted by the Australian Plant Census:

- Pultenaea indira Orthia & Crisp subsp. indira has smooth, glabrous leaves;
- Pultenaea indira subsp. monstrosita Orthia has slightly warty, densely hairy leaves;
- Pultenaea indira subsp. pudoides Orthia has slightly warty, sparsely hairy leaves.

== Distribution and habitat ==
Subspecies indira grows in a range of habitats from woodland to low heath including in rocky places, the edges of salt lakes and disturbed areas. It is widely distributed from the Cape Arid National Park to Ravensthorpe and Lake King with scattered populations further inland. Subspecies monstrosita grows in mallee on gentle slopes and flats mainly between Ravensthorpe, Lake King and the Fitzgerald River National Park. Subspecies pudoides grows in tall heath or low scrub near Narrogin and Corrigin.

== Conservation status ==
Pultenaea indira subsp. indira is classified as "not threatened" but subsp. monstrosita is listed as "Priority Three" meaning that it is poorly known and known from only a few locations but is not under imminent threat, and subsp. pudoides as "Priority Two" by the Western Australian Government Department of Biodiversity, Conservation and Attractions, meaning that it is poorly known and from only one or a few locations.
