= Calothamnus gracilis =

Scientific classification
- Kingdom: Plantae
- Clade: Tracheophytes
- Clade: Angiosperms
- Clade: Eudicots
- Clade: Rosids
- Order: Myrtales
- Family: Myrtaceae
- Genus: Calothamnus
- Species: C. gracilis

Binomial name
- Calothamnus gracilis R.Br.

Synonyms
- Melaleuca gracilis (R.Br.) Craven & R.D.Edwards

Species of flowering plant

Calothamnus gracilis is a plant in the myrtle family, Myrtaceae and is endemic to the south-west of Western Australia. It is a spreading shrub with upright foliage, common in heath within its range. It has long, thin leaves and produces dark red flowers at different times of the year, depending partly on rainfall. It is similar to Calothamnus gibbosus but lacks the corky bark on the older branches of that species and its flowers and fruit are not as deeply embedded in the bark. (In 2014 Craven, Edwards and Cowley proposed that the species be renamed Melaleuca gracilis.)

== Description ==
Calothamnus gracilis is a spreading shrub growing to a height of about 1.5 metres (4.9 ft). Its leaves are fine, circular in cross section and up to 80 millimetres (3 in) long tapering to a sharp point but because the leaves are so long, the plant is not prickly.

The flowers are bright red and arranged in small groups mostly on one side of the stems. The flower spikes are up to 80 millimetres (3 in) long and there are 5 sepals, petals and clawlike stamen bundles.

== Taxonomy and naming ==
Calothamnus gracilis was first formally described by Robert Brown in 1812 in William Aiton's Hortus Kewensis. The specific epithet (gracilis) is a Latin word meaning "slender", and possibly refers to the thin branches of this species compared to those of the otherwise similar Calothamnus gibbosus.

== Distribution and habitat ==
Calothamnus gracilis is widespread and common in the south of south-western Western Australia in the area between Albany and Esperance including in the Avon Wheatbelt, Coolgardie, Esperance Plains, Jarrah Forest, Mallee and Warren biogeographic regions. It grows in sandy and gravelly soils in heath.

== Ecology ==
Calothamnus gracilis is an important food source for the tiny honey possum (Tarsipes rostratus). Research has been performed to evaluate the role of this possum in the spread of the plant pathogen, Phytophthora cinnamomi.

== Conservation ==
Calothamnus gracilis is classified as "not threatened" by the Western Australian government department of parks and wildlife.
