= Letterbook of Explorers' Journals =

Collection of reports of exploration in Western Australia

The Letterbook of Explorers' Journals is a collection of transcriptions of journals and reports of exploration in Western Australia between 1827 and 1870. Transcribed by hand by John Septimus Roe, they are the source of best provenance for the majority of the journals' contents, the originals of which have been lost in most cases.

== Transcription and availability ==
During Roe's time as Surveyor General of Western Australia, Roe attempted to transcribe every journal of exploration in Western Australia into his Letterbook. As a result of his efforts, Western Australia has an exceptionally good record of its early explorations, nearly every significant journal being extant from 1827 until Roe's retirement in 1870. After 1870, however, the maintenance of exploration reports lapsed. The Survey Office retained Roe's Letterbook, and continued to hold journals and reports, but no attempt was made to collate or archive these in a sensible manner. In the 1920s, the Survey Office made typescript copies of Roe's Letterbook, but neither the typescript nor the originals were made accessible to the public until 1966, when the Battye Library took photocopies of the typescripts and bound them into six volumes, for use by the public. These volumes, entitled Exploration Diaries, are still the most accessible copies of the journals that Roe transcribed. However, they are not entirely reliable: many words, including some names of places and people, were transcribed incorrectly in the making of the 1920s transcript. The original Letterbook of Explorers' Journals remains the source of best provenance for most journals. It is now lodged with the State Records Office of Western Australia, where it is given item number 328 of Series 2117.
