= Stokes National Park =

National park in Western Australia

- IUCN category II (national park)
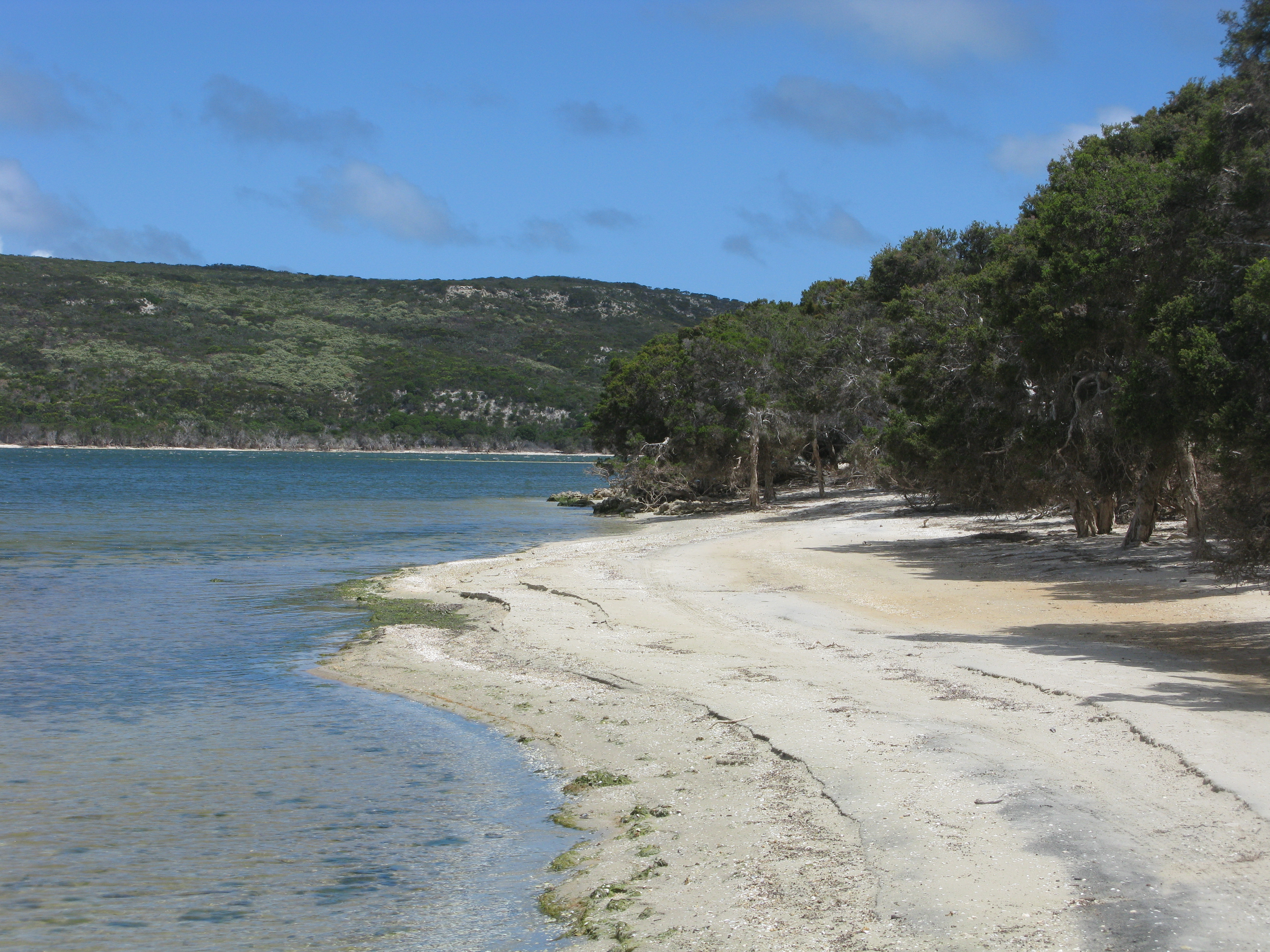
- Stokes Inlet (Bewenerup) in Stokes National Park

- Location within Western Australia
- Location: Western Australia
- Nearest city: Esperance
- Coordinates: 33°49′22″S 121°08′05″E
- Area: 97.26 km^{2} (37.55 sq mi)
- Established: 1976
- Governing body: Department of Parks and Wildlife
- Website: Official website

Stokes National Park is a national park in the Goldfields-Esperance region of Western Australia, 538 km south-east of Perth. The National Park is located 80 kilometres (50 mi) west of Esperance on the southern coast.

The park was named after Stokes Inlet, which lies within the park and is its best known feature, which was in turn named in 1848 by John Septimus Roe the Surveyor General of Western Australia while leading a five-man exploration expedition along the coast, commemorating John Lort Stokes' work on HMS Beagle surveying the Western Australian coast.

The area of the park is 9,726 hectares (24,030 acres) excluding 16 ha (40 acres) that is part of the historic Moir homestead.

The park covers areas of coastal heath and scrubland, smaller areas of low dense forest and sandy beaches around the inlet and coast to the south of the park.

The National Park is on a relinquished pastoral lease, originally known as Fanny Cove Station, which in 1951 became Young River Station. It was then reverted to crown land and national park status by 1973. The Moir homestead ruins from the 1873 establishment at Fanny Cove were on a heritage list by 1993, but have since been destroyed by fire.

== See also ==
- Protected areas of Western Australia
