= Swainsona kingii =

Scientific classification
- Kingdom: Plantae
- Clade: Tracheophytes
- Clade: Angiosperms
- Clade: Eudicots
- Clade: Rosids
- Order: Fabales
- Family: Fabaceae
- Subfamily: Faboideae
- Genus: Swainsona
- Species: S. kingii

Binomial name
- Swainsona kingii F.Muell.

Synonyms
- Swainsona kingii F.Muell. isonym; Swainsona kingii F.Muell. subsp. kingii; Swainsona kingii subsp. ornata A.T.Lee

Species of legume

Swainsona kingii is a species of flowering plant in the family Fabaceae and is native to Western Australia and South Australia. It is a prostrate or ascending annual or perennial herb, with imparipinnate leaves with usually 5 egg-shaped leaflets with the narrower end towards the base, and racemes of 1 to 3 pink to purple flowers.

== Description ==
Swainsona kingii is a prostrate or ascending annual or perennial herb, that typically grows to a height of about 15 cm (5.9 in) and has many stems. The leaves are imparipinnate, mostly 15–50 mm (0.59–1.97 in) long with usually 5 egg-shaped leaflets with the narrower end towards the base, 5–12 mm (0.20–0.47 in) long and 2–9 mm (0.079–0.354 in) wide with stipules 5–20 mm (0.20–0.79 in) long at the base of the petioles. The flowers are pink to purple, arranged in racemes of 1 to 3 10–50 mm (0.39–1.97 in) long, on a peduncle up to 0.5 mm (0.020 in) long. The sepals are joined at the base to form a tube 1.5 mm (0.059 in) long, with lobes shorter than the tube. The standard petal is 5–10 mm (0.20–0.39 in) long and almost as wide, the wings 5–9 mm (0.20–0.35 in) long and the keel 5–8 mm (0.20–0.31 in) long and about 2 mm (0.079 in) deep. Flowering occurs from May to October, and the fruit is a narrowly elliptic pod 20–30 mm (0.79–1.18 in) long on a stalk about 1 mm (0.039 in) long, with the remains of the strongly curved style 2–3 mm (0.079–0.118 in) long.

== Taxonomy and naming ==
Swainsona kingii was first formally described in 1886 by Ferdinand von Mueller in Henry Sandford King's Plants Collected in Capricornic Western Australia. The specific epithet (kingii) honours King.

== Distribution ==
This species of swainsona is widespread in Western Australia, extending to the far west of South Australia, often in clay depressions, often near the edges of creek beds or lakes. It occurs in the Carnarvon, Coolgardie, Gascoyne, Geraldton Sandplains, Great Sandy Desert, Great Victoria Desert, Little Sandy Desert, Murchison, Nullarbor, Pilbara and Yalgoo bioregions of Western Australia.
