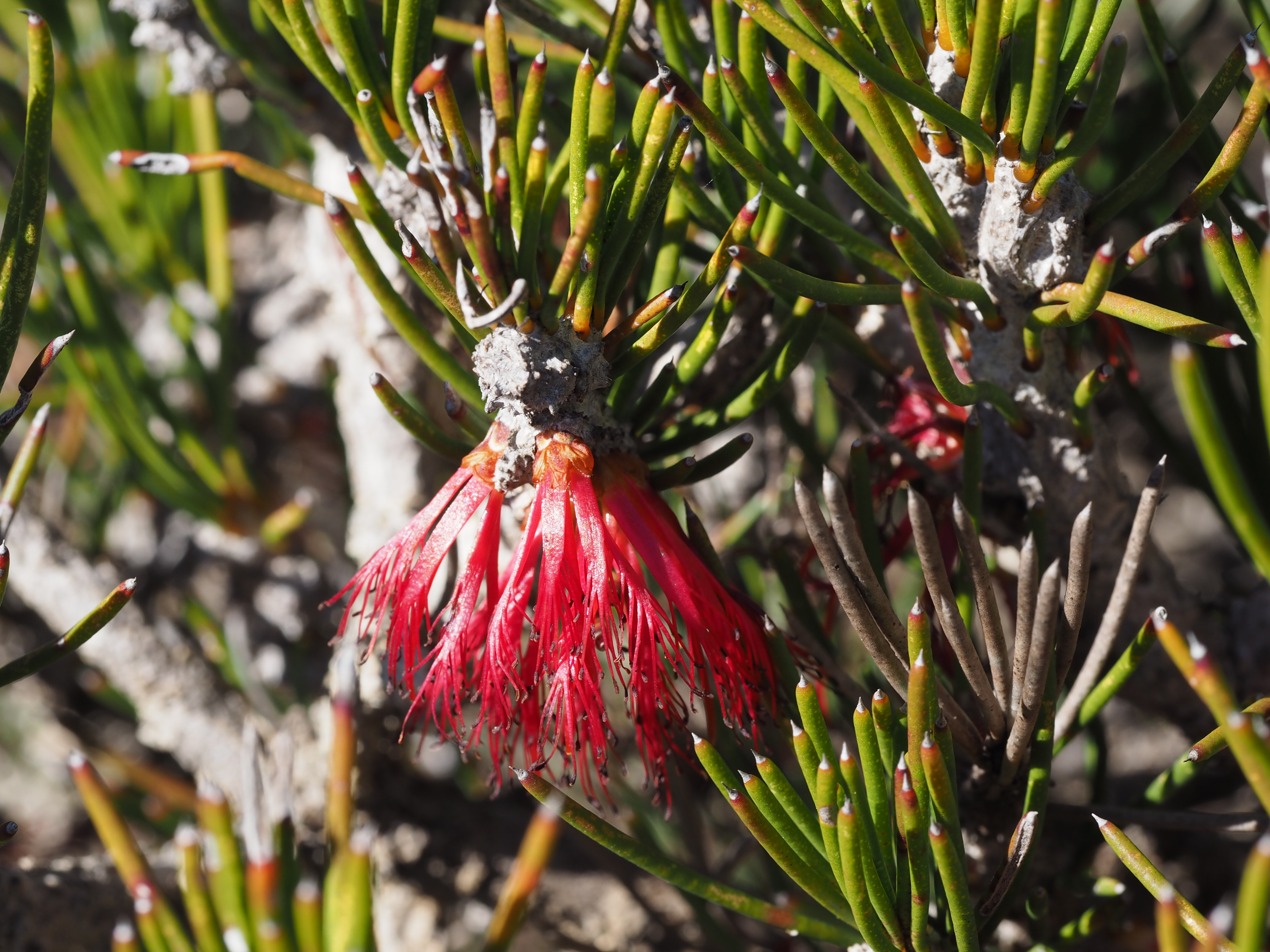
- Calothamnus gibbosus leaves and flowers

Scientific classification
- Kingdom: Plantae
- Clade: Embryophytes
- Clade: Tracheophytes
- Clade: Angiosperms
- Clade: Eudicots
- Clade: Rosids
- Order: Myrtales
- Family: Myrtaceae
- Genus: Calothamnus
- Species: C. gibbosus

Binomial name
- Calothamnus gibbosus Benth.

Synonyms
- Melaleuca protumida Craven & R.D.Edwards

= Calothamnus gibbosus =

Species of flowering plant

Calothamnus gibbosus, commonly known as corky net-bush, is a plant in the myrtle family, Myrtaceae and is endemic to the south-west of Western Australia. Its distinguishing characteristic is its corky bark in which the hypanthium of the flowers and much of the fruits is buried. Only the petals and stamens emerge from the bark. (In 2014 Craven, Edwards and Cowley proposed that the species be renamed Melaleuca protumida.)

== Description ==
Calothamnus gibbosus is an erect, spreading shrub growing to a height of about 1.5 metres (5 ft) with thick, corky bark. Its leaves are stiff, circular in cross section, mostly 30–80 millimetres (1–3 in) long and taper to a prickly point.

The flowers initially appear as warty growths on the branches. When they open, the flower cup (the hypanthium) is buried in the corky bark with only the petals and stamens extending beyond it. The petals surround 5 claw-like bundles of red stamens, each containing 7 to 11 stamens. Flowering occurs from May to December and is followed by fruits which are woody capsules, mostly buried within the corky bark.

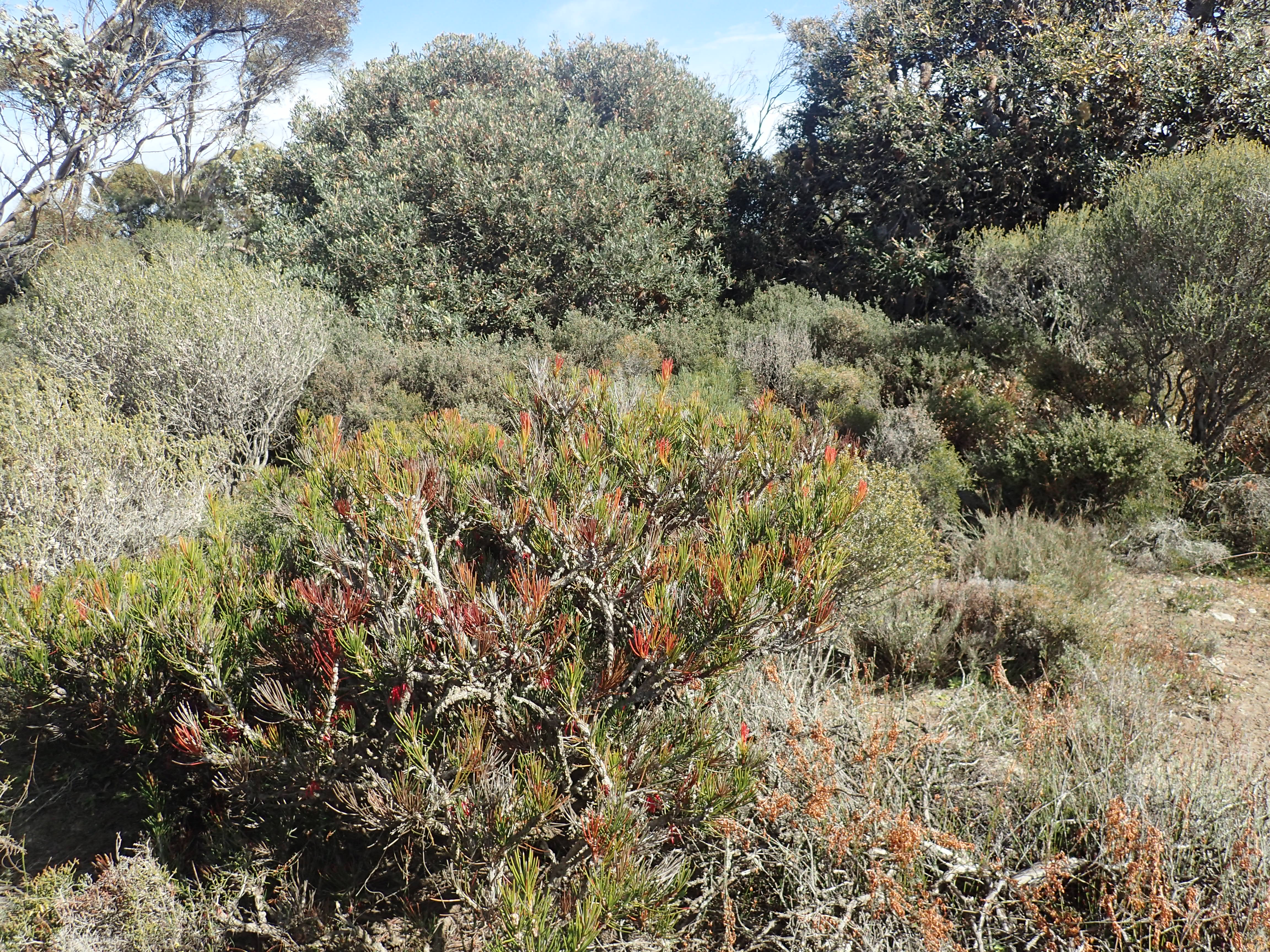
C. gibbosus growing near Ravensthorpe

== Taxonomy and naming ==
Calothamnus gibbosus was first formally described in 1867 by George Bentham from a specimen collected by James Drummond near the "Gardner River". The specific epithet (gibbosus) is a Latin word meaning "humped".

== Distribution and habitat ==
Calothamnus gibbosus occurs in the area between the Lort River and the Stirling Range and mostly at least 10 kilometres (6 mi) from the coast in the Esperance Plains and Mallee biogeographic region. It grows on sandy clay loams, sometimes over gravel or laterite.

== Conservation ==
This species is classified as "not threatened" by the Western Australian Government of Western Australia Department of Parks and Wildlife.
