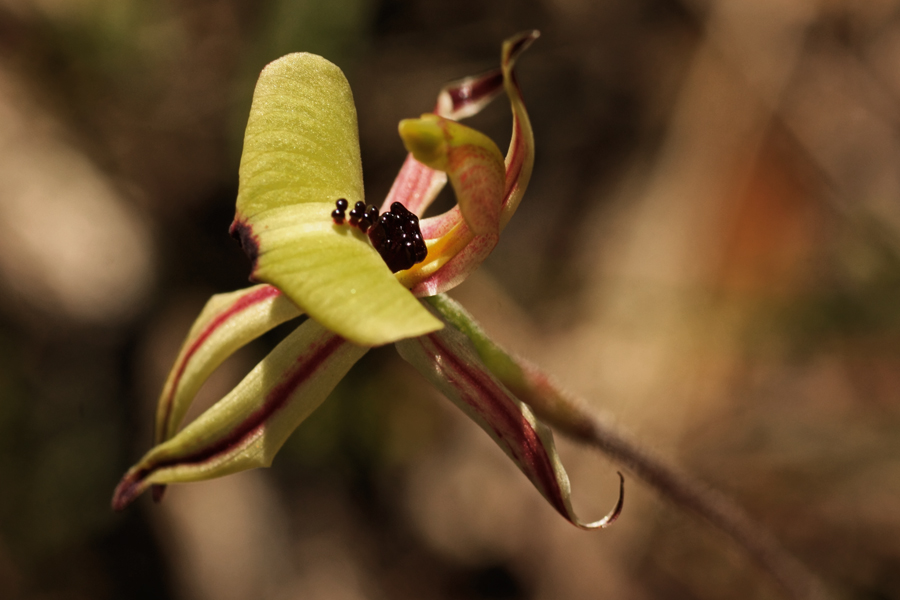
- In the Coalseam Conservation Park

Scientific classification
- Kingdom: Plantae
- Clade: Embryophytes
- Clade: Tracheophytes
- Clade: Spermatophytes
- Clade: Angiosperms
- Clade: Monocots
- Order: Asparagales
- Family: Orchidaceae
- Subfamily: Orchidoideae
- Tribe: Diurideae
- Genus: Caladenia
- Species: C. roei

Binomial name
- Caladenia roei Benth.

Synonyms
- Calonema roei (Benth.) D.L.Jones & M.A.Clem.; Phlebochilus roei (Benth.) Szlach.; Calonemorchis roei (Benth.) D.L.Jones & M.A.Clem.; Jonesiopsis roei (Benth.) D.L.Jones & M.A.Clem.

= Caladenia roei =

Clown orchid

Species of orchid

Caladenia roei is a species of orchid endemic to the south-west of Western Australia. It is also known as the common clown orchid, clown orchid, ant orchid, man orchid and jack-in-the-box. It has a single erect, hairy leaf and up to three greenish-yellow and red flowers with a relatively broad labellum. It is a common orchid throughout the south-west and is especially common on granite outcrops.

== Description ==
Caladenia roei is a terrestrial, perennial, deciduous, herb with an underground tuber and a single erect, hairy leaf, 60–150 mm (2–6 in) long and about 5 mm (0.2 in) wide. Up to three greenish-yellow and red flowers 30–40 mm (1–2 in) long, 20–30 mm (0.8–1 in) wide are borne on a stalk 120–300 mm (5–10 in) tall. The sepals have thick, yellowish-brown, club-like glandular ends 3–4 mm (0.1–0.2 in) long. The dorsal sepal is erect, 15–20 mm (0.6–0.8 in) long, about 2 mm (0.08 in) wide and often curves gently forward. The lateral sepals and petals are about the same size as the dorsal sepal and turn obliquely downward and form a crucifix-like shape. The labellum is 8–11 mm (0.3–0.4 in) long, 13–16 mm (0.5–0.6 in) wide and greenish-yellow with a small red tip which curls under. The sides of the labellum are smooth, lacking teeth but there is a dense band of dark reddish-purple, calli up to 1.5 mm (0.06 in) long, in the middle of the labellum. Flowering occurs from August to October.

== Taxonomy and naming ==
Caladenia roei was first described in 1873 by Alex George and the description was published in Flora Australiensis. The specific epithet (roei) honours John Septimus Roe.

== Distribution and habitat ==
The clown orchid is found across a wide area of the south-west of Western Australia from as far north as the Murchison River to as far east as Ravensthorpe where it grows in a range of habitats but is especially common on granite outcrops.

== Conservation ==
Caladenia roei is classified as "not threatened" by the Western Australian Government Department of Parks and Wildlife.
