= Harold Camm =

Australian geographer

- Born: Australia
- Occupation: Geographer

Harold Camm (7 September 1903 – 6 April 1990) was an Australian geographer who served as the Surveyor General of Western Australia from 1959 to 1968.

== Biography ==
He was born in Geraldton, Western Australia on 7 September 1903.

In July 1932, he married Dorothea Laura Hill Parker (1900 - 1992), a medical practitioner. Their son, Richard Camm was born in 1934.

He died on 6 April 1990 in Perth, Western Australia.

== Education ==
He was educated at Perth Modern School.

== Career ==
He became a licensed surveyor on 9 April 1925.

In 1959, he was appointed as the Surveyor General of Western Australia by the department of land administration under the terms of the Electoral Districts Act 1963.

His period of leadership encompassed a peak land settlement era where 1,000,000 acres of virgin bush was annually classified and subdivided into farms for conditional purchase release. Substantial areas of land were set aside in conservation reserves and a policy of road reserves 20 and 40 chains (400 and 800 m) wide was implemented under his direction. The importance of these interconnecting ribbons of land to the conservation of flora and fauna has only been recognized in recent years.

New technologies were also introduced into the department and the survey industry over this period, equipment such as electronic distance measuring instruments, computers and photogrammetric equipment. As a result, greater efficiencies in surveying and mapping were attained, including the accelerated geodesic surveying and mapping programs across Australia, to which Western Australia was a major contributor.

His tenure ended in 1968 and he was succeeded by John Frank Morgan.

He also served with the Australian Army in the Royal Australian Survey Corps during World War Two from 1942 until 1945, and attained the rank of captain.

== See also ==
- List of pastoral leases in Western Australia
