= Henry Sandford King =

Australian geographer

- Born: 1862; Australia
- Died: 1930 (aged 67–68); Australia
- Occupation: Geographer

Henry Sandford King (1862 - 1930) was an Australian geographer who served as the Surveyor General of Western Australia from 1918 to 1923.

== Biography ==
He was born in Creswick, Victoria, Australia in May 1862.

He married Dorothea Lefroy (daughter of Gerald de Courcy and Elizabeth Brockman) in 1886. They had six children.

He died in 1930 in Papua New Guinea. The cause of his death was determined to be pneumonia.

== Education ==
He completed his schooling at Geelong Grammar School.

He later attended the Wesley College, Melbourne.

== Career ==
He obtained his Licensed Surveyor's Certificate in 1883.

He served as the Surveyor General of Western Australia from 1918 to 1923.

The Lake King, Western Australia is named after him.

== See also ==
- List of pastoral leases in Western Australia
- Surveyor General of Western Australia
- Lake King, Western Australia
