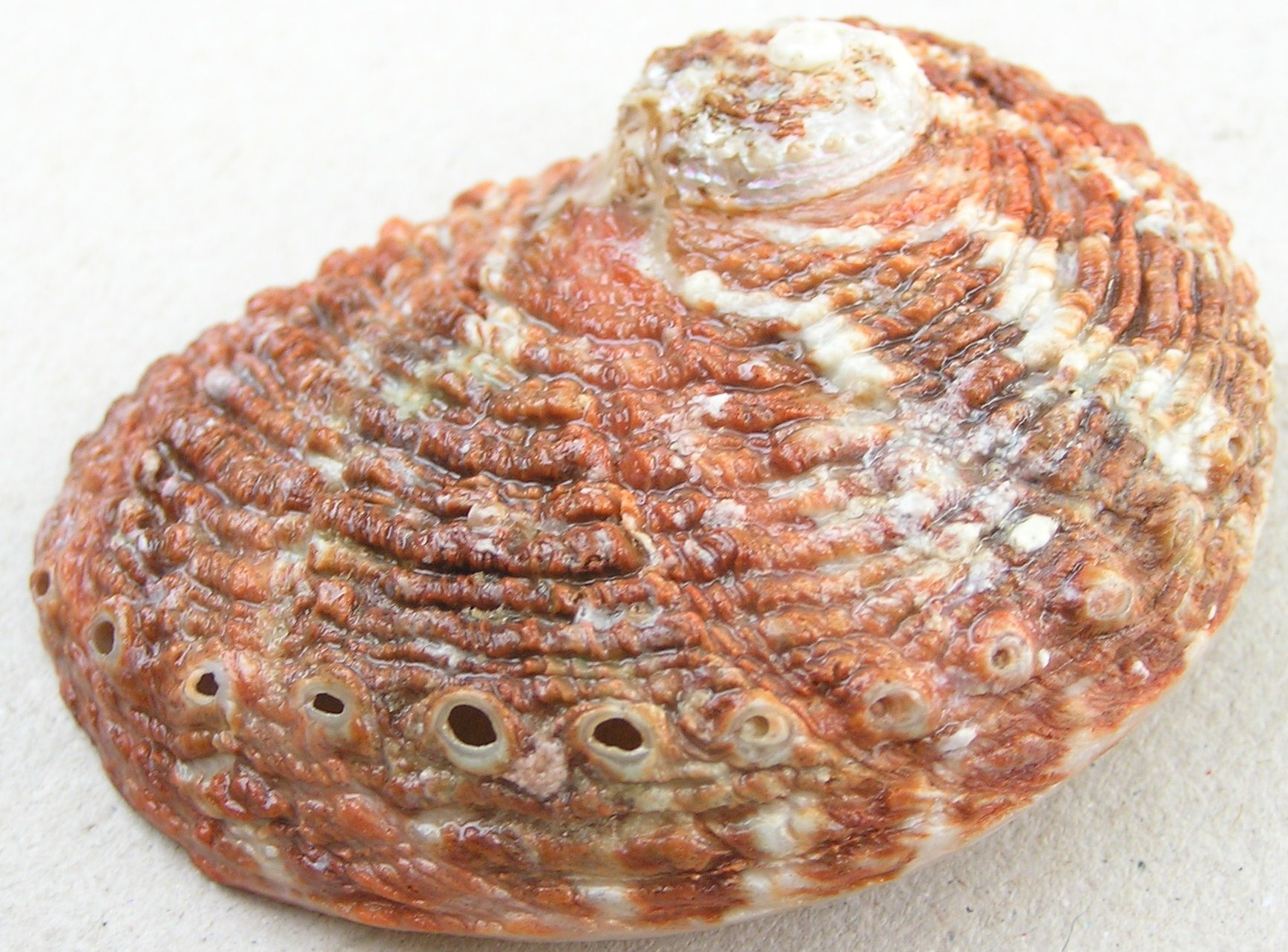
- Apical view of a shell of Haliotis roei

Conservation status
- Near Threatened (IUCN 3.1)

Scientific classification
- Kingdom: Animalia
- Phylum: Mollusca
- Class: Gastropoda
- Subclass: Vetigastropoda
- Order: Lepetellida
- Family: Haliotidae
- Genus: Haliotis
- Species: H. roei

Binomial name
- Haliotis roei Gray, 1826

Synonyms
- Haliotis scabricostata Menke, 1843; Haliotis sulcosa Philippi, 1845

= Haliotis roei =

Species of gastropod

Haliotis roei, common name Roe's abalone, is a species of sea snail, a marine gastropod mollusk in the family Haliotidae, the abalone.

== Description ==
The size of the shell varies between 50 mm and 120 mm. "The shell has a short-oval shape. The distance of the apex from the nearest margin is somewhat over one-fifth the greatest length of the shell. The sculpture consists of strong unequal spiral cords crossed by radiating folds. The 7 to 9 perforations are rather small and a little raised The right side is straighter than the rounded left margin, and the back is depressed. The color of the shell is scarlet-red, more or less marbled with olive-green, painted with broad white rays. The spiral riblets are numerous, unequal, separated by deeply cut grooves. Their summits are cut by fine radiating striae. They are further rendered uneven by more or less developed folds radiating from the suture. The spire is rather elevated. The inner surface is silvery, very iridescent, with pink, green and steel-blue reflections. The columellar plate is narrow, obliquely truncated at its base."

== Distribution ==
This marine species is endemic to Australia and occurs off Western Australia to Victoria.
