= Lort River =

River in Western Australia

Coordinates: 33°48′13″S 121°11′26″E

Location
- Country: Australia

Physical characteristics
- Source
  - location: Peak Charles National Park
  - elevation: 206 metres (676 ft)
- Mouth
  - location: Stokes Inlet
- Length: 130 kilometres (81 mi)
- Basin size: 2,502 square kilometres (966 mi^{2})
- Discharge
  - average: 6,190 ML/a (0.196 m^{3}/s; 6.93 cu ft/s)

The Lort River is a river in the Goldfields-Esperance region and the Eastern Mallee sub-region of Western Australia.

Lort River was named in 1848 by John Septimus Roe, the Surveyor General of Western Australia, while leading a five-man exploration expedition along the coast; the name commemorates John Lort Stokes' work on HMS Beagle surveying the Western Australian coast.

The headwaters of the Lort River begin in the Peak Charles National Park and its surrounding vacant Crown land. The river flows in a south-westerly direction and enters farmland area for a distance of 45 kilometres (28 mi) with a reserve that is an average of 500 metres (1,640 ft) wide containing riparian vegetation. The river then enters the Stokes National Park before discharging into Stokes Inlet.

Both the river and the inlet were named by Roe while exploring and surveying the area in 1848 after his friend Admiral John Lort Stokes.

The catchment of the river has been extensively cleared for agricultural purposes. It is estimated that 60% of the catchment has been cleared; this has led to increased sedimentation, eutrophication and salinity levels of the river.
