= John Septimus Roe =

Australian politician (1797–1878)

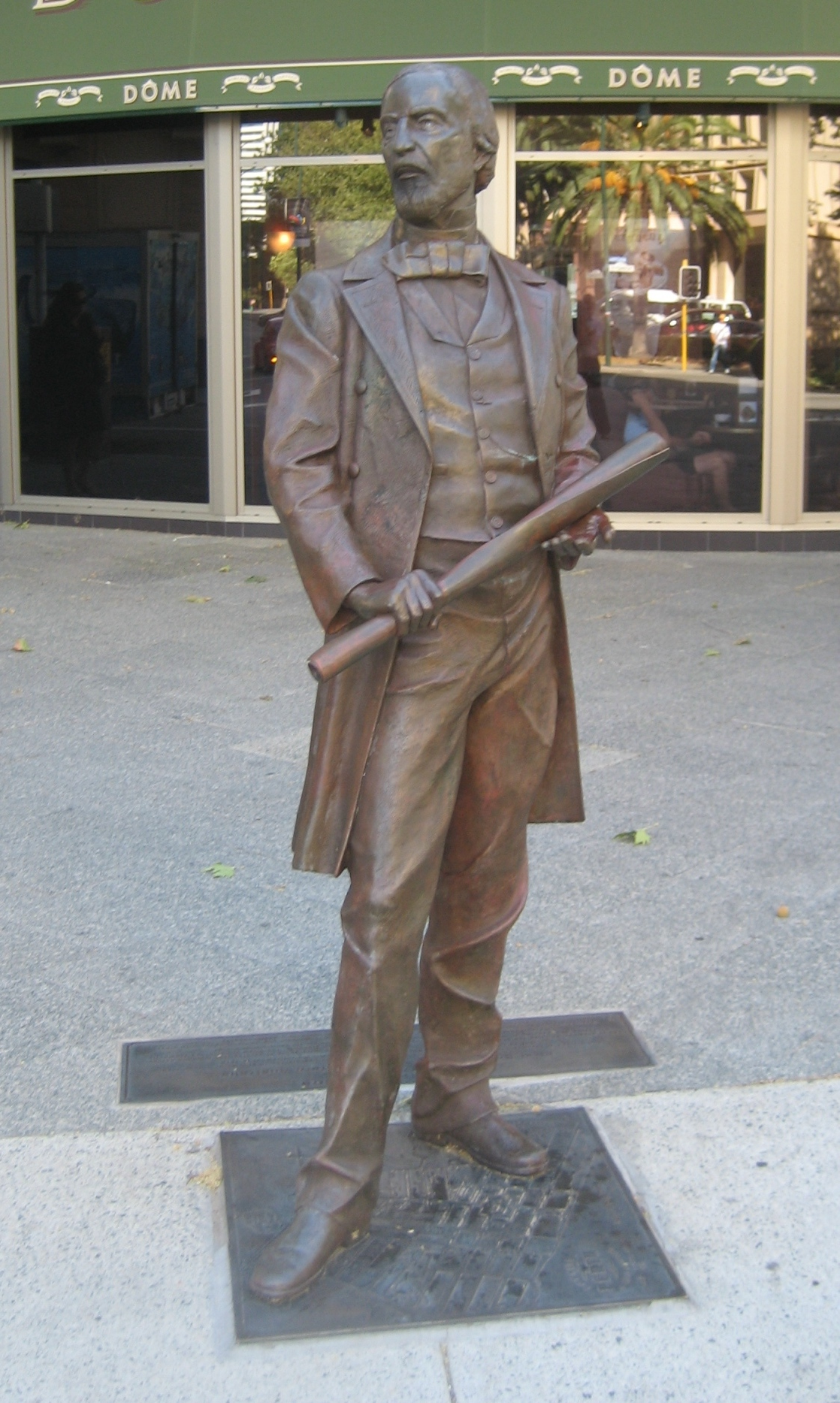
Statue of Roe, at the corner of Victoria Avenue and Adelaide Terrace, Perth, near the site of his home at the end of St George's Terrace

John Septimus Roe (8 May 1797 – 28 May 1878) was the first Surveyor-General of Western Australia. He was a renowned explorer, a member of Western Australia's legislative and executive councils for nearly 40 years, but also a participant in the Pinjarra massacre on 28 October 1834.

== Early life ==
John Septimus Roe was born at Newbury, Berkshire on 8 May 1797. He was the seventh son of James Roe, the rector of Newbury. At 10 years of age, Roe was sent to Christ's Hospital School (which is still standing today) in London, to study for a career as a school teacher. There, he showed a great aptitude for mathematics, and was selected for training by the Mathematical School, which trained selected students for service in the Royal Navy. He was an outstanding student, and was apprenticed to the Navy at the age of 15.

== Naval service ==
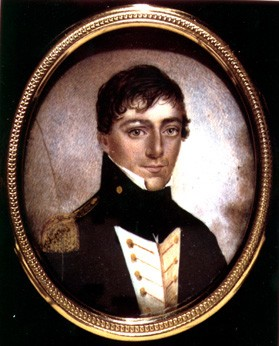
John Septimus Roe, 1824

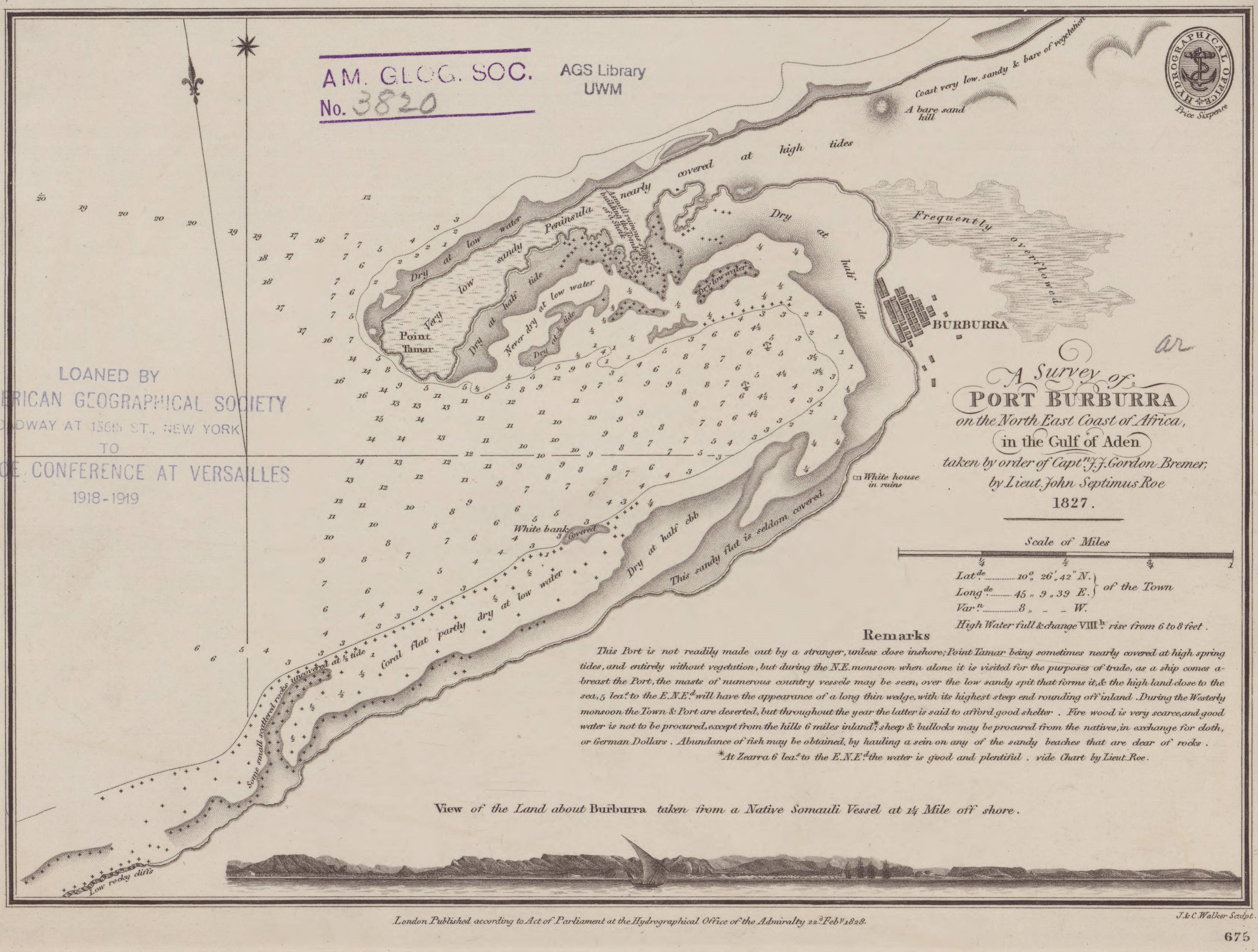
An Admiralty Chart of Berbera drawn in 1827 by John Septimus Roe

John Septimus Roe entered the Naval service on 11 June 1813. His first appointment was as a midshipman on Rippon, captained by Sir Christopher Cole. Over the next year, the Rippon was engaged in a blockade of the French coast. After the Napoleonic Wars ended in 1814, the Rippon returned to England, and Roe was appointed as a midshipman to Horatio under Captain William Henry Dillon on 17 August. One of their first assignments was to escort a valuable convoy to North America and to then patrol the waters off Newfoundland, protecting the fisheries, under then Governor and Commander-in Chief, Vice Admiral Richard Goodwin Keats. Roe travelled with Horatio until January 1817.

At the conclusion of the Napoleonic Wars, the prospects for a junior officer were limited. On the recommendation of his former captain, Dillon, his former Commander in chief, Richard Goodwin Keats recognising his aptitude for navigation and cartography provided a letter of recommendation to the United Kingdom Hydrographic Office. On 4 February 1817, the Admiralty appointed him to the surveying service in New South Wales, under the command of Captain Phillip Parker King; Roe sailed for New South Wales on the troopship Dick, arriving on 3 September 1817.

=== New South Wales survey service ===
Roe's first survey journey as assistant to King was the King expedition of 1817, a rough survey of the northern and north-west coast of Australia. The party sailed from Port Jackson (Sydney Harbour) on board the Mermaid on 21 December 1817, sailing south then west along the south coast of Australia. While anchored at King George Sound in January 1818, Roe nearly drowned in the Kalgan River while trying to circumnavigate Oyster Harbour.

Later, Roe was permitted to name a bay on the northwest coast, which he named Nickol Bay in honour of a man who had been lost overboard. On the north coast, King named a point on the peninsula called Mount Roe in Roe's honour. The Mermaid eventually returned down the west coast and back along the south coast to Sydney, arriving on 29 July.

At the end of December 1818, the Mermaid sailed to Van Diemen's Land (now Tasmania) to survey the Derwent River and the eastern coast to Macquarie Harbour. It was a simple task, and they were back in Sydney by the middle of February 1819.

The King expedition two years later (1819) was expected to last eight or nine months. Their mission was to make a proper survey of the northern coast. After leaving Sydney on 8 May 1819, the Mermaid rounded Cape York and crossed the Gulf of Carpentaria. They then spent a substantial period exploring and surveying the coast and islands of Arnhem Land, before surveying Bathurst Island, then exploring and surveying Cambridge Gulf. They then continued their survey of the coast, past Cape Londonderry and westwards as far as the Bonaparte Archipelago. Again they crossed to Timor for provisions, then returned to Sydney.

Roe's following voyage the following year was again intended to survey along the north coast, but they ran into violent weather almost as soon as they left Sydney. Mermaid's bowsprit was lost, and she was forced to return to Sydney with three feet of water in the hold. After taking repairs, she left without incident, rounded Cape York and again headed west along the coast of Arnhem Land.

At Goulburn Island, Roe was ambushed by natives and narrowly escaped with his life. Continuing west, Mermaid developed such a bad leak that King decided to careen her at a bay that was consequently named Careening Bay. Upon completion of repairs, the Mermaid was still found to be leaking, so the decision was taken to return to Sydney along the west and south coasts. Two rivers were discovered in York Sound and traced, one of them being named Roe River in honour of Roe's father.

On return to Port Jackson, the Mermaid was found to be no longer seaworthy, and was replaced by the brig Bathurst. In the May 1821 King expedition, Roe sailed in the Bathurst. They sailed north up the coast, anchoring at Cairncross Island in bad weather on 30 June. When the sails were hauled in, the fore top-mast stay-sail halliards were accidentally let go, and Roe, who was at the masthead holding onto them, fell 50 feet (15 m) onto the deck. He was knocked unconscious, but was not badly hurt; he recovered quickly, but in later years would attribute to this accident the loss of sight in his right eye.

Despite the accident, the expedition proceeded to the west coast, which was surveyed as far as Roebuck Bay. At the end of August, they sailed for Mauritius. After three weeks there, they headed south to King George Sound. They then sailed north up the west coast, surveying as they went, before returning to Port Jackson. During this voyage, Roe was promoted to lieutenant. Back in Sydney, Roe carried out a survey of Sydney Harbour. Despite the capsizing of his boat on 19 August 1822, with the loss of four lives, the survey was completed, to be published by the Admiralty in 1826. Shortly after completion of the survey, Roe returned to England on the Bathurst, arriving in June 1823.

Roe received his next commission on 2 February 1824. His instructions were to return to Australia on board the Tamar, which arrived in Sydney in July, and the following month was sent to help establish a settlement at Melville Island. The Fort Dundas settlement was officially established on 21 October, and shortly afterwards the Tamar sailed for Bombay, where she was refitted and reprovisioned. She then spent some time in surveying and naval duties between Ceylon, India and Rangoon.

Whilst on Tamar Roe served in the First Anglo-Burmese War. After a number of other excursions, Tamar returned to England, arriving late in November 1827.

== Surveyor-General of Western Australia ==
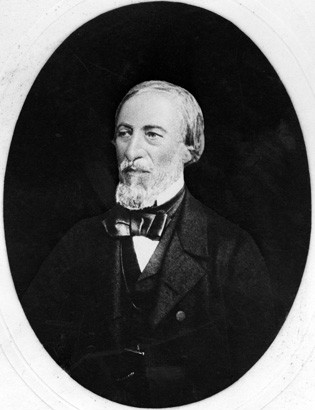
John Septimus Roe, 1850s

Back in England, Roe spent some time recovering his health, which had been poor, and visiting his family. When the position of Surveyor-General of New South Wales became vacant, he expressed interest, but was informed it had already been filled. Shortly afterwards, however, he was offered the position of Surveyor-General of Western Australia, to be attached to an intended new settlement at the Swan River. Roe accepted on the condition that the position be a civilian appointment, as he was keen to leave the navy.

Having accepted the position, Roe had little time to set his affairs in order, as the official party would soon be leaving on the Parmelia. He then set about the purchase of equipment for his own requirements and for the surveying office. The Roes embarked upon the barque Parmelia on 3 February 1829.

== Marriage and family ==
Roe proposed to Matilda Bennett and they married before leaving for Australia in February 1829. Matilda Roe's fondness for gardening is claimed to be the reason for the kink between St Georges Terrace and Adelaide Terrace, the main streets through Perth's central business district. Their home in Western Australia for many years was "Mandalay", Middle Swan, later the home of the art dealer and benefactor Claude Hotchin.

Roe and his wife had thirteen children. The fifth son, Frederick Mackie Roe, was second-in-command on Charles Cooke Hunt's 1866 expedition to Lake Lefroy in the Coolgardie region.

== Establishing the Swan River Colony ==
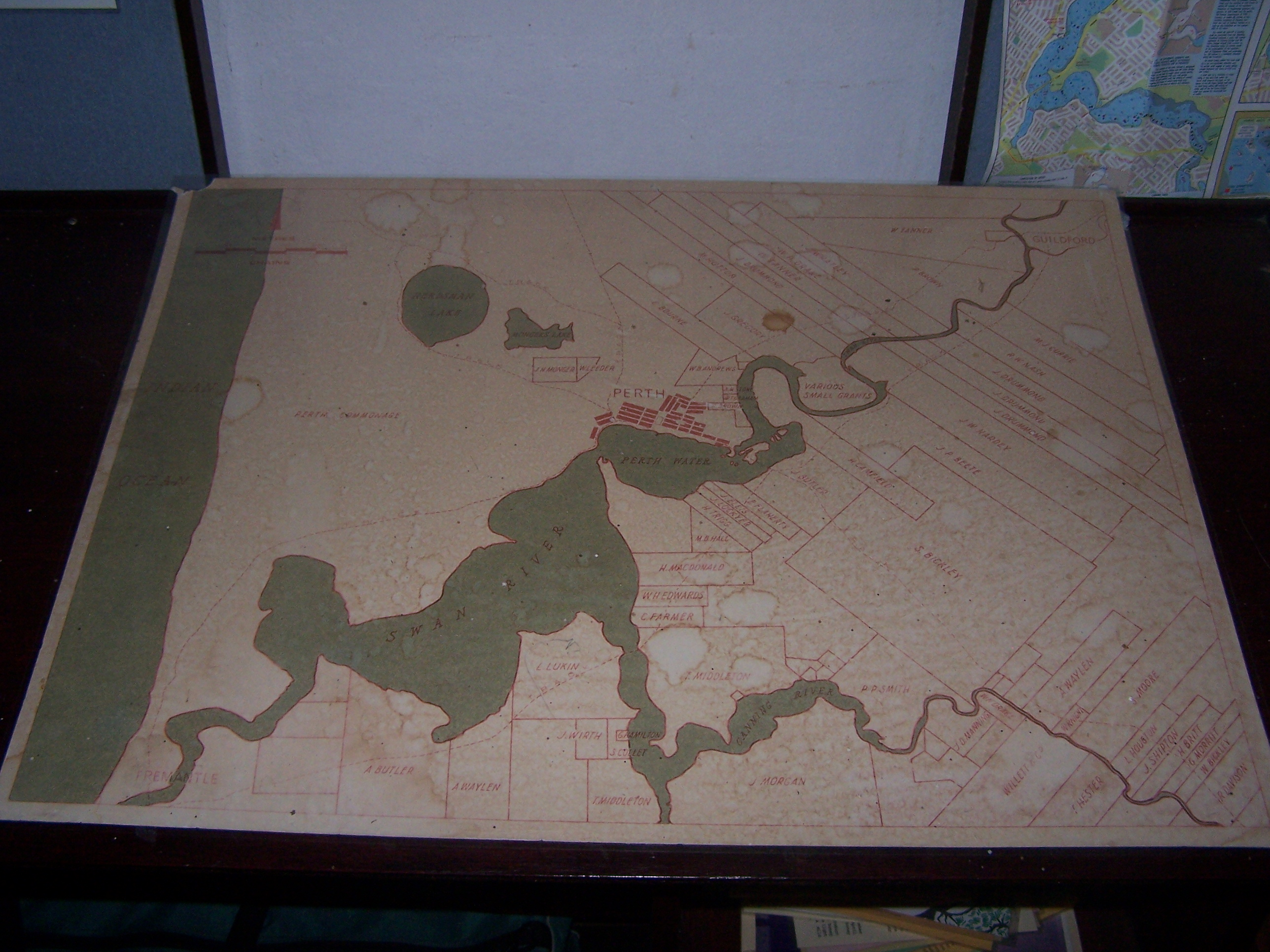
Survey Map of the Swan River Colony circa 1830s

The Parmelia arrived at the Swan River on 1 June 1829. Roe immediately set about making preliminary surveys of the harbour, river and surrounding land. The sites of Perth and Fremantle were chosen on his recommendation, and he was responsible for laying out the towns. During this period, Roe had only a single assistant to help him. Because of the immediate need to survey the harbour and lay out the towns, no rural blocks were surveyed until September. The unexpected arrival of three shiploads of settlers in August, all of whom expected to take up land immediately, put Roe's department under extreme pressure. By April the following year 36 ships had brought settlers to the colony, and Roe's department had a massive backlog of blocks to survey. Roe later said of this period: (Note: Quote from Roe's evidence before the House of Commons Select Committee on Transportation, 22 March 1861.)

I went there with the very first ship, with the first Governor, Captain Stirling. I had on my staff only one assistant surveyor, and what could be done with one assistant, with the whole of the townships to be fixed upon and surveyed, the country to be examined, the settlers located, the harbours to be surveyed, &c. &c.? It was perfectly impossible to do more than we did. Everything that could be done was done, but it was insufficient to place the people on their lands in time to prevent their sustaining very great losses.

=== Exploring Western Australia ===
John Septimus Roe conducted numerous exploring expeditions between 1829 and 1849:

- In June 1829, he explored the Swan and Canning River
- In January 1830, he explored the country around Leschenault, the Collie, Ferguson and Preston rivers, Cape Naturaliste and Geographe Bay
- In November 1831, he explored the area around Doubtful Island Bay, the Kalgan River, Albany, Torbay, Wilsons Inlet, and Kojonup
- In 1832 he explored around the Hotham and Williams rivers
- In 1834, he explored to Pinjarra on the Murray River, then Bunbury, Kojonup, Albany and back to Perth; the Pinjarra Massacre – in which Roe was involved – occurred during this expedition
- In 1835, he explored the area around Moorilup on the Kalgan River, then explored the Hay and Sleeman rivers
- In October and November 1835, he was part of the Great Southern Expedition, which explored the country between Perth and Albany by two different routes, with a view to deciding on a route for a road between the two towns
- In October and November the following year, he explored the land 290 kilometres (180 mi) east and 160 kilometres (100 mi) north from Perth
- In December 1837 he discovered and surveyed Peel Harbour and Warnbro Sound
- In January 1838 he explored the coast between the Swan River and Cape Naturaliste
- In June 1838 he explored from the Swan River to Bunbury via the Murray, Harvey, Collie and Preston rivers, then returned along the base of the Roe and Darling ranges
- In May 1839 he passed through unexplored country on an expedition to rescue from starvation three men who had been part of George Grey's disastrous expedition to Shark Bay
- In December the same year, he travelled overland with Governor Hutt to Albany and back, using new routes
- In June 1847, he explored the country around and north of Champion Bay
- From September 1848, he conducted a five-month-long expedition "from Avon River to Stirling Range, and thence eastward to Russell Range and Capes Pasley and Arid on the south coast, and 60 to 100 miles (97 to 161 km) inland, returning by different routes on this occasion and discovering coal on the Fitzgerald and Phillips rivers." Roe was seriously injured on this expedition, and undertook no more.

== Later life ==
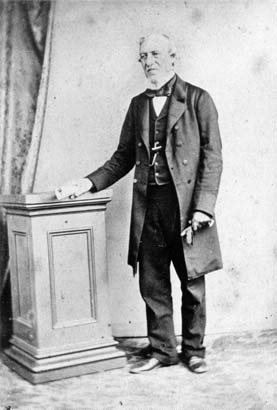
John Septimus Roe, 1870

With the death of Matilda in 1871, Roe sought permission to retire. At 73 years of age, he had served the colony for more than 40 years.

Already blind in one eye, he became increasingly infirm over the next five years. He died on 28 May 1878, and was honoured by a public funeral and burial at East Perth Cemetery.

== Legacy ==
Arguably the most significant legacy left by Roe was the setting aside of Kings Park. As early as December 1830, Roe responded to a request to cut timber below Mount Eliza with: "Mr. Mews to be informed that the neighbourhood of Mt. Eliza is reserved for public purposes".

Although it is widely accepted that Roe's successors Malcolm Fraser and John Forrest were most instrumental in the establishment of Kings Park, Roe was clearly responsible for the initial setting aside of the park.

Roe was the founding president of the Swan River Mechanics' Institute, holding the position until his death. Both the Western Australian Museum and the State Library of Western Australia emerged from the institute, Roe's large scientific collection forming the basis for the museum's collection. Jackson (1982) has argued that Roe can be regarded as the founder of both institutions.

During Roe's time in term in the Survey Office, he attempted to transcribe every journal of exploration in Western Australia. His Letterbook of Explorers' Journals survives to this day, as a result of which Western Australia has an exceptionally good record of its early explorations, nearly every significant journal being extant from 1827 until Roe's retirement in 1870.

In 1955 the State Library obtained on indefinite loan a large collection of log books, diaries and letters left by Roe. The collection constitutes one of the most important private collections ever to be lodged with the library.

John Septimus Roe was honoured in numerous place names:

- Roebourne, first town in the north of Western Australia
- Mount Roe, near Walpole
- Roelands, a town near Bunbury
- Roe Range, near Brunswick Junction
- Roe Highway, a major highway in Perth
- Roe's poison (Oxylobium spectabile Endl.), first collected by Roe at Emu Hill near Narembeen, Western Australia
- Roe Street, Perth
- The electoral district of Roe in the Legislative Assembly of Western Australia
- John Septimus Roe Anglican Community School in Mirrabooka
- Caladenia roei, a species of orchid cited in Bentham's Flora Australiensis
- Haliotis roei, Roe's abalone, a species of abalone from the southern Australian coast, from Western Australia to Victoria

== See also ==
- O'Byrne, William Richard (1849). "Roe, John Septimus" . A Naval Biographical Dictionary . John Murray – via Wikisource.
