= Lake King, Western Australia =

Lake King
- Town
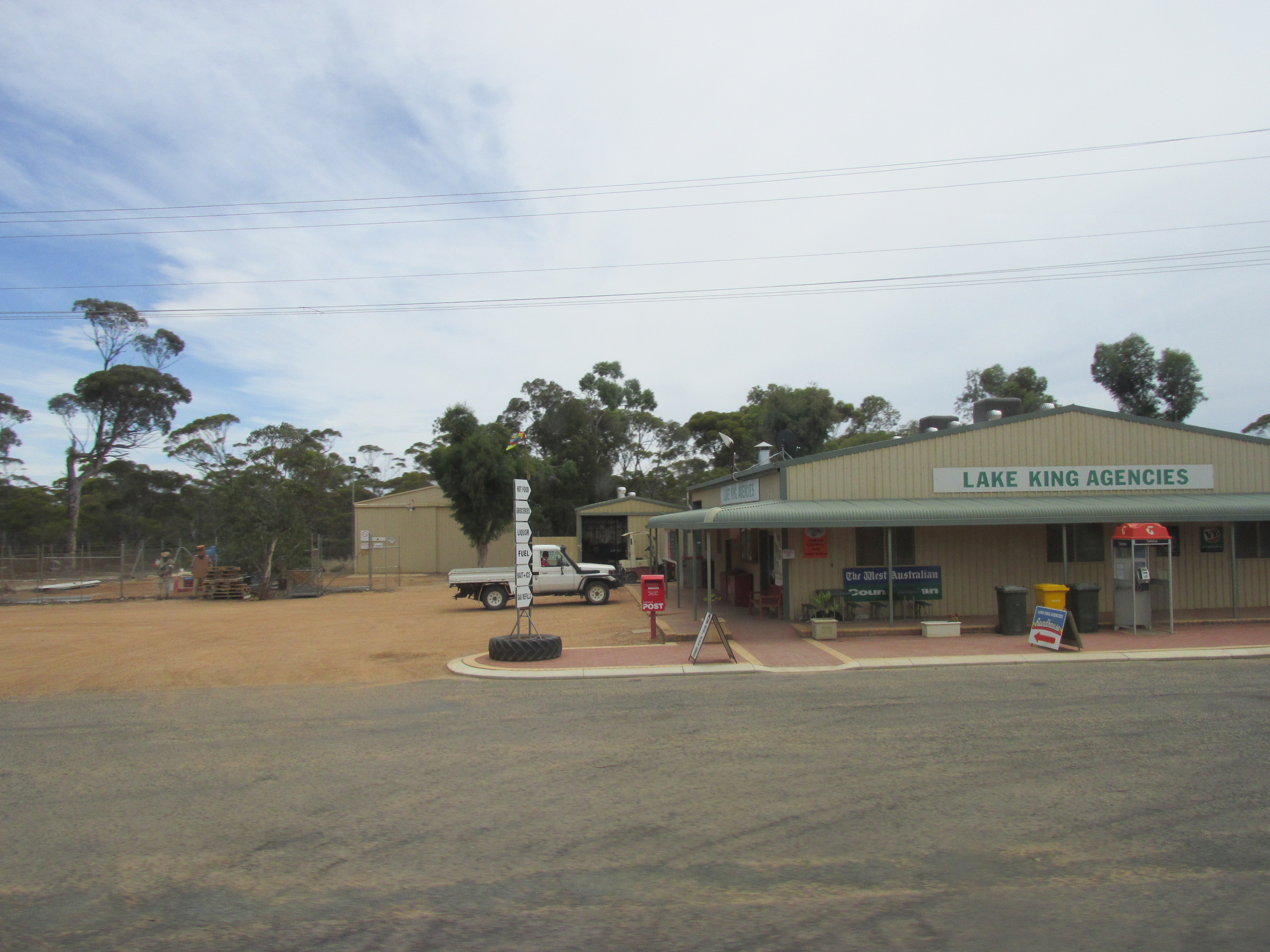
- Lake King Agencies, 2015

- Interactive map of Lake King
- Coordinates: 33.085°S 119.689°E
- Country: Australia
- State: Western Australia
- LGA: Shire of Lake Grace
- Location: 464 km (288 mi) ESE of Perth; 64 km (40 mi) NW of Ravensthorpe; 114 km (71 mi) E of Lake Grace
- Established: 1936

Government
  - State electorate: Roe
  - Federal division: O'Connor

Area
  - Total: 1,373.6 km^{2} (530.3 sq mi)
- Elevation: 344 m (1,129 ft)

Population
  - Total: 84 (SAL 2021)
- Postcode: 6356

Lake King is a town in the eastern Wheatbelt region of Western Australia, 464 kilometres (288 mi) from Perth along State Route 40 between Ravensthorpe and Newdegate. As of 2016, the town had a population of 95. The 2011 census recorded both the population of the town and the surrounding area for a population of 332.

Lake King is named after a nearby lake which in turn was named after the Surveyor General of Western Australia, Henry Sandford King, by Marshall Fox, District Surveyor (Narrogin).

In 1926, following completion of an initial land classification survey of the Lake King district that defined 230,000 acres as suitable for settlement, a large official inspection party was led by Surveyor General John Percy Camm, Sydney Stubbs (MLA Wagin), Edwin Wilkie Corboy (MLA Yilgarn), and James Cornell (MLC South Province). The area was surveyed and access roads built during 1927, and land was released in 1928 at prices from 4/6 to 16/- per acre. The town struggled through the Great Depression but thrived in the postwar years on the back of high wool and wheat prices.

The Lake King Progress Association lobbied the government to declare a townsite in 1935 and the town was gazetted in 1936.

The surrounding areas produce wheat and other cereal crops. The town is a receival site for Cooperative Bulk Handling.
