= Surveyor General of Western Australia =

Responsible for government surveying in Western Australia

The Surveyor General of Western Australia is the person nominally responsible for government surveying in Western Australia.

In the early history of Western Australia, the office of surveyor general was one of the most important public offices. The first surveyor general, John Septimus Roe, was responsible for the laying out of many townsites, including Perth and Fremantle, and played a prominent role in the politics of the day. Another surveyor general, John Forrest, became Premier of Western Australia, and later a Cabinet minister in Australia's first federal government.

In modern times, the position of surveyor general has diminished in importance. It remains a statutory office, and is housed within the current agency named Landgate.

== List of surveyors general of Western Australia ==
This is a list of surveyors general of Western Australia.

Surveyor General	Period in office
John Septimus Roe	1829–1872
Malcolm Fraser	1872–1883
John Forrest	1883–1890
John Sherlock Brooking	1887–1896 (acting to 1890)
Harry Johnston	1896–1915
Frederick Slade Drake-Brockman	1915–1917
Henry Sandford King	1918–1923
John Percy Camm	1923–1938
Wallace Vernon Fyfe	1938–1945
Thomas Suter Parry	1945–1948
Wallace Vernon Fyfe	1948–1959
Harold Camm	1959–1968
John Frank Morgan	1968–1984
William George Henderson	1984–1986
Henry James Houghton	1986
Christopher Alan Grant	1987–1990
Henry James Houghton	1991–2001
Eugene Michael Browne	2001–2003
Kenneth Alexander	2003–2004
Grahame Searle	2005–2008
Mike Bradford	2008–2017
Dione Bilick	2017–present

== See also ==
- Department of Lands and Surveys, Western Australia
- Surveyor Generals Corner
- Surveyor General of New South Wales
- Surveyor General of Queensland
- Surveyor General of South Australia
- Surveyor General of Tasmania
- Surveyor General of the Northern Territory
- Surveyor General of Victoria
