= Gairdner River (Kimberley, Western Australia) =

River in Kimberley, Western Australia

Coordinates: 15°41′21.08″S 124°44′56.16″E

Gairdner River (Kimberley)

Location
- Country: Australia

Physical characteristics
- Source
  - location: Macdonald Range
  - elevation: 122 metres (400 ft)
- Mouth
  - location: Glenelg River
- Length: 42 km (26 mi)

The Gairdner River is located in the Kimberley region of Western Australia. The river is located in the west Kimberley, and is a 42 km long tributary of the Glenelg River.

The river has two main tributaries - Fish River and Dunedale Creek.

The Gairdner River was named in 1838 by Lieutenants George Grey and Franklin Lushington, on Grey's first disastrous exploratory expedition along the Western Australian coast.

Grey named the river after Gordon Gairdner, Senior Clerk of the Australian and Eastern Departments in the Colonial Office, later Chief Clerk of the Colonial Office and Secretary and Registrar of the Most Distinguished Order of Saint Michael and Saint George.

Gairdner also had named after him, on Western Australia's south coast near Bremer Bay, another Gairdner River, Gordon Inlet and Mount Gordon.
