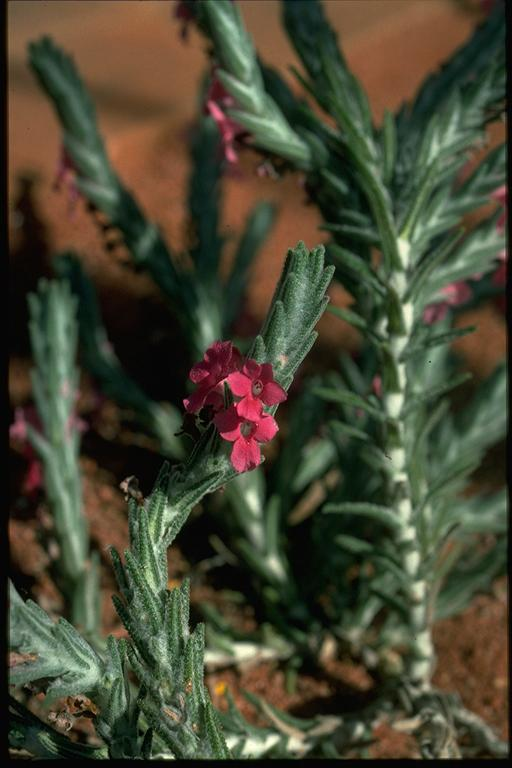

Scientific classification
- Kingdom: Plantae
- Clade: Tracheophytes
- Clade: Angiosperms
- Clade: Eudicots
- Clade: Asterids
- Order: Lamiales
- Family: Lamiaceae
- Genus: Hemiphora
- Species: H. uncinata

Binomial name
- Hemiphora uncinata (Turcz.) B.J.Conn & Henwood
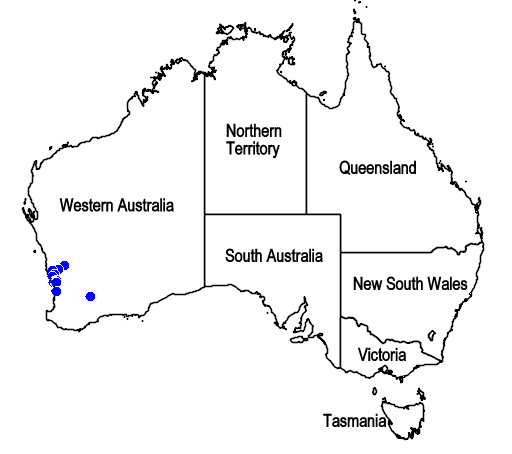

Synonyms
- Chloanthes bullata F.Muell.; Chloanthes uncinata Turcz.; Pityrodia uncinata (Turcz.) Benth.; Pityrodia uncinata (Turcz.) Benth. var. uncinata

= Hemiphora uncinata =

Species of flowering plant

Hemiphora uncinata is a flowering plant in the mint family Lamiaceae and is endemic to the south-west of Western Australia. It is an erect, spreading shrub with its branches densely covered with white, woolly hairs. Its leaves are rough and wrinkled and the flowers are tube-shaped with deep pink petals with wavy edges.

== Description ==
Hemiphora uncinata is an erect, spreading shrub which grows to a height of 30–60 cm (10–20 in) with its branches covered with white, cottony hairs. The leaves are linear to lance-shaped, 10–35 mm (0.4–1 in) long, 1–4 mm (0.04–0.2 in) wide, with their edges curved downwards or under and often have a hooked tip. The upper surface is rough and wrinkled with small blisters and the lower surface is covered with woolly hairs at least when young.

The flowers are deep pink and are arranged singly or in groups of up to three on woolly stalks 2–4 mm (0.08–0.2 in) long, in upper leaf axils. There are bracts 10–15 mm (0.4–0.6 in) long at the base of the flowers and which are glabrous on the inner surface and densely woolly outside, and there are shorter, glabrous bracteoles. The five sepals are 6–8 mm (0.2–0.3 in) long, and joined at their base to form a short tube. The sepals are woolly on the outside, linear to lance-shaped and remain attached to the plant after the petals have fallen. The petals are 13–15 mm (0.5–0.6 in) long and joined to form a wide tube 7–10 mm (0.3–0.4 in) long and 5–7 mm (0.2–0.3 in) wide at the top end. The petal tube has soft hairs on the outside but glabrous inside except for a densely hairy ring above the ovary. The five petal lobes form two "lips", the upper lip with two lobes joined for most of their length and the lower with three spreading lobes. The five lobes have wavy or irregularly notched edges and are roughly circular in shape, 4–6 mm (0.16–0.24 in) in diameter. The four stamens are shorter than the petal tube with the lower pair much longer than the upper pair. Flowering occurs in spring and the fruit is almost spherical, hairy, veiny and 2–3 mm (0.08–0.1 in) in diameter. This species is similar to Hemiphora exserta but has its stamens short and enclosed in the petal tube.

== Taxonomy and naming ==
This species was first formally described in 1863 by Nikolai Turczaninow who gave it the name Chloanthes uncinata. The description was published in Bulletin de la Société Impériale des Naturalistes de Moscou from a specimen collected by James Drummond. In 1870 George Bentham changed the name to Pityrodia uncinata and in 2011, Barry Conn, Murray Henwood and Nicola Streiber transferred four species, including this one, from the genus Pityrodia into Hemiphora. The specific epithet (uncinata) is a Latin word meaning "hooked".

== Distribution and habitat ==
Hemiphora uncinata is mainly found in near-coastal areas between Perth and the Murchison River, but there are disjunct populations near Gairdner and between Hyden and Lake Cronin, in the Geraldton Sandplains and Swan Coastal Plain biogeographic regions where it grows in sandy clay in depressions that are sometimes flooded in winter.

== Conservation ==
Hemiphora uncinata is classified as "not threatened" by the Western Australian Government Department of Parks and Wildlife.
