= Gairdner, Western Australia =

Gairdner
- Town
- Coordinates: 34.2120°S 118.9378°E
- Country: Australia
- State: Western Australia
- LGA(s): Shire of Jerramungup
- Location: 484 km (301 mi) SE of Perth; 31 km (19 mi) S of Jerramungup; 46 km (29 mi) NW of Bremer Bay
- Established: 1960

Government
  - State electorate(s): Roe
  - Federal division(s): O'Connor

Area
  - Total: 975.3 km^{2} (376.6 sq mi)
- Elevation: 176 m (577 ft)

Population
  - Total(s): 105 (SAL 2021)
- Postcode: 6337
Localities around Gairdner
| Needilup | Jerramungup | Fitzgerald River NP |
| Boxwood Hill | Gairdner | Fitzgerald River NP |
| Boxwood Hill | Boxwood Hill | Bremer Bay |

Gairdner is a town and locality in the Shire of Jerramungup, Great Southern region of Western Australia. The town is located between Jerramungup and Boxwood Hill along the South Coast Highway, on Devil Creek, a tributary of the Bremer River.

The surrounding area was opened up by the state government for settlement in the 1950s. The primary school, the first building at what was to be the Gairdner townsite, was established in 1960. Prior to 1960, students attended school at Jerramungup. The name of the townsite was approved by the Minister of Lands in 1978.

The town is named after the Gairdner River`(25 km to the east), which was named by John Septimus Roe while on an expedition in the area in 1848. He named it after Gordon Gairdner, Senior Clerk of the Australian and Eastern Departments in the Colonial Office, later Chief Clerk of the Colonial Office and Secretary and Registrar of the Most Distinguished Order of Saint Michael and Saint George. Roe also named Mount Gordon and Gordon Inlet (at the mouth of the Gairdner River) after Gairdner.

The surrounding areas produce wheat and other cereal crops. The town is a receival site for Cooperative Bulk Handling.
