= Calytrix similis =

Scientific classification
- Kingdom: Plantae
- Clade: Tracheophytes
- Clade: Angiosperms
- Clade: Eudicots
- Clade: Rosids
- Order: Myrtales
- Family: Myrtaceae
- Genus: Calytrix
- Species: C. similis

Binomial name
- Calytrix similis Craven

Species of flowering plant

Calytrix similis is a species of flowering plant in the myrtle family Myrtaceae and is endemic to the south-west of Western Australia. It is a glabrous shrub with linear to elliptic or lance-shaped leaves and purple flowers with about 45 to 50 stamens in several rows.

== Description ==
Calytrix similis is a glabrous shrub that typically grows to a height of up to 70 cm (28 in) and grows from the tips of the flowering stems. Its leaves are linear, narrowly elliptic, elliptic or lance-shaped with the narrower end towards the base, 2.5–8 mm (0.098–0.315 in) long and 0.6–1 mm (0.024–0.039 in) wide on a petiole 0.3–1 mm (0.012–0.039 in) long, with stipules up to 1.25 mm (0.049 in) long at the base of the petiole. The flowers are arranged singly or in scattered small groups on a peduncle 6.0–7.5 mm (0.24–0.30 in) long with elliptic lobes 3–4 mm (0.12–0.16 in) long. The floral tube is spindle-shaped, 6.5–8 mm (0.26–0.31 in) long and has ten ribs. The sepals are egg-shaped, 0.80–1.25 mm (0.031–0.049 in) long, 1.25–4.0 mm (0.049–0.157 in) wide with an awn up to 8 mm (0.31 in) long. The petals are purple and there are 45 to 50 stamens in three or four rows. Flowering occurs from January to May.

This shrub is superficially similar to C. tenuiramea.

== Taxonomy ==
Calytrix similis was first formally described in 1987 by Lyndley Craven in the journal Brunonia from specimens collected by Alex George 64 km (40 mi) west of Bremer Bay in 1964. The specific epithet ("similis") means 'similar to' Calytrix tenuirama.

== Distribution and habitat ==
This species of Calytrix grows in mallee heath on sand over laterite in the Stirling Range-Porongorup Range-Boxwood Hill districts, in the Esperance Plains and Jarrah Forest bioregions of south-western Western Australia.

== Conservation status ==
Calytrix similis is listed as "not threatened" by the Government of Western Australia Department of Biodiversity, Conservation and Attractions.
