= Pimelea eyrei =

Conservation status
- Priority Two — Poorly Known Taxa (DEC)

Scientific classification
- Kingdom: Plantae
- Clade: Tracheophytes
- Clade: Angiosperms
- Clade: Eudicots
- Clade: Rosids
- Order: Malvales
- Family: Thymelaeaceae
- Genus: Pimelea
- Species: P. eyrei

Binomial name
- Pimelea eyrei F.Muell.

Synonyms
- Banksia eyrei (F.Muell.) Kuntze; Pimelea longiflora subsp. eyrei (F.Muell.) Rye

Species of flowering plant

Pimelea eyrei is a species of flowering plant in the family Thymelaeaceae and is endemic to the southwest of Western Australia. It is an erect shrub with hairy, narrowly elliptic leaves and clusters of densely hairy, white or cream-coloured flowers.

== Description ==
Pimelea eyrei is an erect shrub that typically grows to a height of 0.3–1.5 m (1 ft 0 in – 4 ft 11 in) with a single brown stem at ground level. Its leaves are narrowly elliptic, 5–9 mm (0.20–0.35 in) long, 1.5–2.5 mm (0.059–0.098 in) wide and densely hairy on both sides, sometimes appearing silvery when young. The flowers are arranged in erect clusters on a peduncle 2–20 mm (0.079–0.787 in) long with 4 or 6 egg-shaped involucral bracts 5–12 mm (0.20–0.47 in) long and 1.5–3 mm (0.059–0.118 in) wide at the base, each flower on a hairy pedicel 0.4–0.5 mm (0.016–0.020 in) long. The flowers are white or cream-coloured, the flower tube 7–12 mm (0.28–0.47 in) long and the sepals egg-shaped and 5–6 mm (0.20–0.24 in) long. Flowering occurs from August to November.

== Taxonomy ==
Pimelea eyrei was first formally described in 1866 by Ferdinand von Mueller in Fragmenta Phytographiae Australiae from specimens collected by George Maxwell. The specific epithet (eyrei) honours the explorer Edward John Eyre. In 1988, Barbara Lynette Rye reduced P. eyrei to a subspecies of P. longiflora, but the change is not accepted by the Australian Plant Census.

== Distribution and habitat ==
This pimelea grows in shrubland between the Bremer River and Hamersley Inlet in the Fitzgerald River National Park in south-western Western Australia.

== Conservation status ==
Pimelea eyrei is listed as "Priority Two" by the Western Australian Government Department of Biodiversity, Conservation and Attractions, meaning that it is poorly known and from only one or a few locations.
