= Pultenaea calycina =

Scientific classification
- Kingdom: Plantae
- Clade: Tracheophytes
- Clade: Angiosperms
- Clade: Eudicots
- Clade: Rosids
- Order: Fabales
- Family: Fabaceae
- Subfamily: Faboideae
- Genus: Pultenaea
- Species: P. calycina

Binomial name
- Pultenaea calycina (Turcz.) Benth.

Synonyms
- Euchilus calycinus Turcz.

Species of flowering plant

Pultenaea calycina is a species of flowering plant in the family Fabaceae and is endemic to near-coastal areas in the south of Western Australia. It is an erect, spindly shrub with flat or more or less cylindrical, grooved leaves and yellow and orange flowers.

== Description ==
Pultenaea calycina is an erect, spindly shrub that typically grows to a height of 0.45–1.0 m (1 ft 6 in – 3 ft 3 in) with hairy stems. The leaves are flat, 3–12.5 mm (0.12–0.49 in) long and 0.7–1.7 mm (0.028–0.067 in) wide or cylindrical but with one or two grooves along the lower surface, 4.5–10 mm (0.18–0.39 in) long and 0.5–0.7 mm (0.020–0.028 in) wide. The leaves are hairy and have stipules at their base. The flowers are yellow and orange with yellow and orange markings and are borne on a hairy pedicel 1.5–3.5 mm (0.059–0.138 in) long. There are hairy bracteoles 1.5–3 mm (0.059–0.118 in) long at the base of the sepals. The sepals are about 5–6 mm (0.20–0.24 in) long and hairy. The standard petal is 6–8 mm (0.24–0.31 in) long, the wings 5–7.3 mm (0.20–0.29 in) long and the keel 5–7 mm (0.20–0.28 in) long. Flowering occurs from August to October and the fruit is an oval pod.

== Taxonomy and naming ==
This species was first formally described in 1853 by Nikolai Turczaninow in the Bulletin de la Société Impériale des Naturalistes de Moscou and given the name Euchilus calycinus, from specimens collected by James Drummond. In 1864, George Bentham changed the name to Pultenaea calycina in Flora Australiensis. The specific epithet (calycina) means "calyx", referring to the unusual sepals.

In 2005, L.A. Orthia and Jennifer Anne Chappill described two subspecies and the names are accepted by the Australian Plant Census:

- Pultenaea calycina (Turcz.) Benth. subsp. calycina that has more or less cylindrical, grooved leaves;
- Pultenaea calycina subsp. proxena (Turcz.) Benth. that has cylindrical leaves.

== Distribution ==
Subspecies calycina occurs from near Bremer Bay to the Stirling Range National Park in the Esperance Plains biogeographic region and subspecies proxena from near Ravensthorpe to west of Esperance in the Esperance Plains and Mallee biogeographic regions.

== Conservation status ==
Pultenaea calycina subsp. calcycina is classified as "Priority Three" by the Government of Western Australia Department of Parks and Wildlife, meaning that it is poorly known and known from only a few locations but is not under imminent threat and subspecies proxena is classified as "Priority Four", meaning that is rare or near threatened.
