= Hemiphora lanata =

Scientific classification
- Kingdom: Plantae
- Clade: Tracheophytes
- Clade: Angiosperms
- Clade: Eudicots
- Clade: Asterids
- Order: Lamiales
- Family: Lamiaceae
- Genus: Hemiphora
- Species: H. lanata

Binomial name
- Hemiphora lanata (Munir) B.J.Conn & Henwood
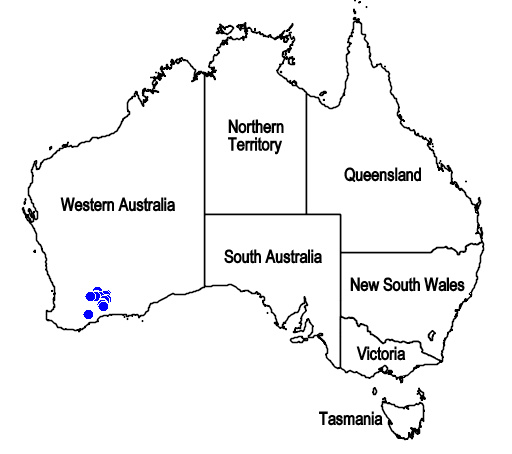

Synonyms
- Pityrodia exserta var. lanata Munir; Pityrodia uncinata auct. non (Turcz.) Benth.: Munir, A.A. (21 December 1979)

Species of flowering plant

Hemiphora lanata is a flowering plant in the mint family Lamiaceae and is endemic to the south-west of Western Australia. It is a sprawling shrub with its branches and leaves densely covered with white, woolly hairs and with deep pink or dark red, curved, tube-shaped flowers with spreading petal lobes on the end. It is similar to Hemiphora exserta except for its cottony leaf-covering and its longer stamens.

== Description ==
Hemiphora lanata is a sprawling shrub which grows to a height of 15–40 cm (6–20 in) with its branches covered with woolly hairs but which become glabrous with age. The leaves are linear to narrow lance-shaped, 8–40 mm (0.3–2 in) long, 1–4 mm (0.04–0.2 in) wide, with their edges strongly curved downwards and both surface densely covered with woolly hairs. The similar H. exserta has leaves that are rough and warty on the upper surface and have short soft hairs on the lower surface of young leaves.

The flowers are arranged singly or in groups of up to three on woolly stalks 2–4 mm (0.08–0.2 in) long, in upper leaf axils. There are bracts 10–15 mm (0.4–0.6 in) long at the base of the flowers and which are glabrous on the inner surface and densely woolly outside, and shorter, glabrous bracteoles. The five sepals are 8–12 mm (0.3–0.5 in) long, and joined at their base to form a short tube at their bases. The sepals are scaly on the outside, linear to lance-shaped and remain attached to the plant after the petals have fallen. The petals are deep pink to dark red, 20–30 mm (0.8–1 in) long and joined to form a downward-curving tube, 13–17 mm (0.5–0.7 in) long and 5–6 mm (0.20–0.24 in) wide at the top end. The petal tube has soft hairs on the outside but glabrous inside except for a densely hairy ring around the ovary. The five petal lobes form two "lips", the upper lip with two short lobes and the lower with three. The lower central lobe is almost twice as large as the other four, elliptic to almost circular in shape, 9–11 mm (0.35–0.43 in) long and wide while the others are more or less egg-shaped. The four stamens extend beyond the end of the petal tube with the lower pair longer than the upper pair. (H. exserta has stamens that are about the same length as the petal tube.) Flowering occurs from June to November and the fruit is almost spherical, hairy and 3–4 mm (0.1–0.2 in) in diameter.

== Taxonomy and naming ==
This species was first formally described in 1979 by Ahmad Abid Munir who gave it the name Pityrodia exserta var. lanata. The description was published in Adelaide Botanic Garden. In 2011, Barry Conn, Murray Henwood and Nicola Streiber raised the variety to species status and transferred four species, including this one, from the genus Pityrodia into Hemiphora. The specific epithet (lanata) is a Latin word meaning "woolly".

== Distribution and habitat ==
Hemiphora lanata mainly occurs between Ravensthorpe, Hyden and Norseman in the Coolgardie and Mallee biogeographic regions where it grows in sandy or salty clay on plains. It generally grows in more inland areas than H. exserta, although the two species sometimes grow near each other

== Conservation ==
Hemiphora lanata is classified as "not threatened" by the Western Australian Government Department of Parks and Wildlife.
