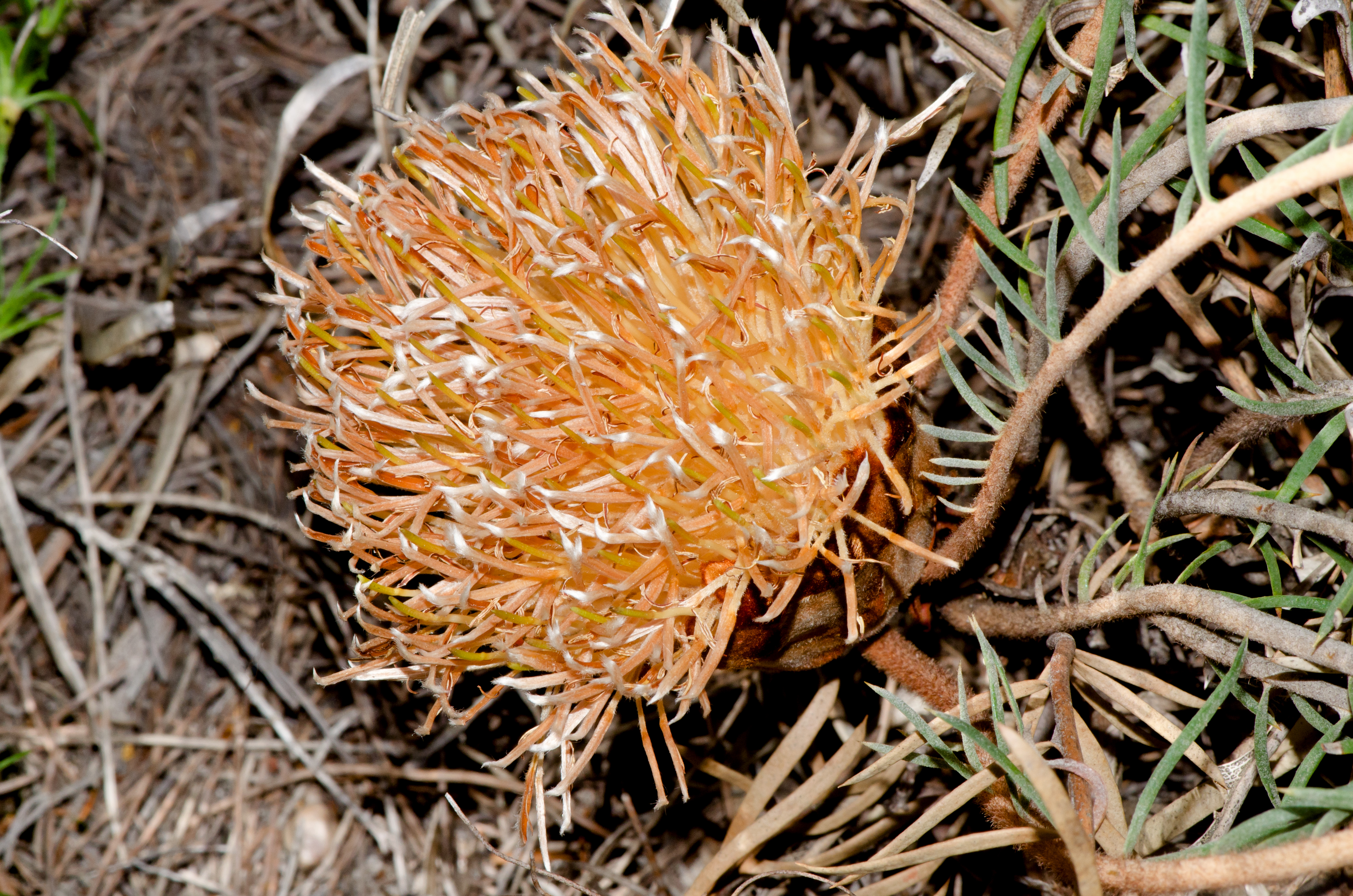
- Open flowers of Banksia pteridifolia subsp. vernalis

Scientific classification
- Kingdom: Plantae
- Clade: Tracheophytes
- Clade: Angiosperms
- Clade: Eudicots
- Order: Proteales
- Family: Proteaceae
- Genus: Banksia
- Subgenus: Banksia subg. Banksia
- Series: Banksia ser. Dryandra
- Species: B. pteridifolia

Binomial name
- Banksia pteridifolia (R.Br.) A.R.Mast & K.R.Thiele

Synonyms
- Dryandra pteridifolia R.Br.; Dryandra pteridifolia var. blechnifolia Hereman nom. inval., nom. nud.; Dryandra sp. 'Fitzgerald (M.A.Burgman s.n.); Josephia pteridifolia (R.Br.) Poir.

= Banksia pteridifolia =

Tangled honeypot

Species of shrub native to Western Australia

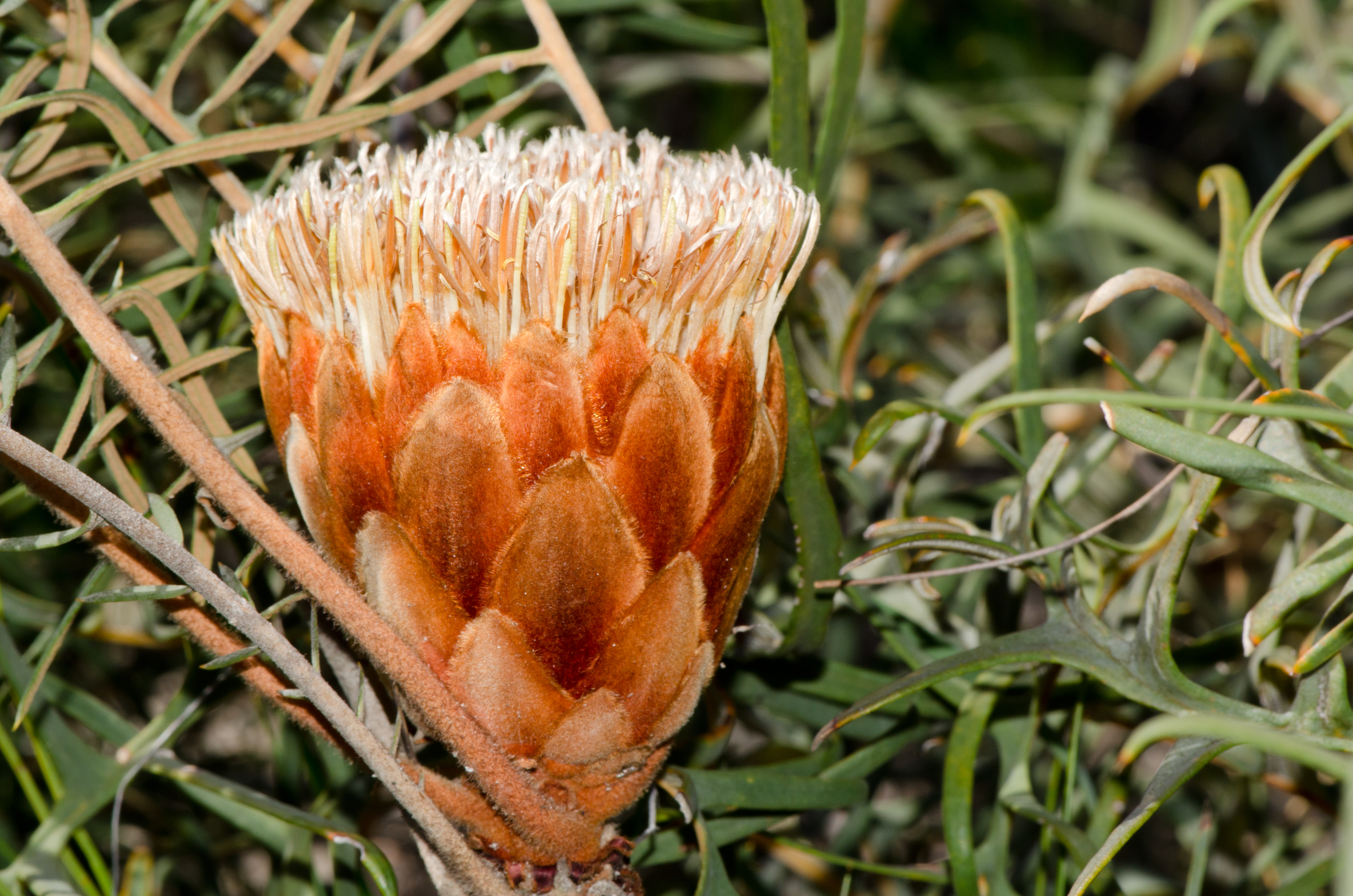
Young inflorescence (subsp. vernalis)

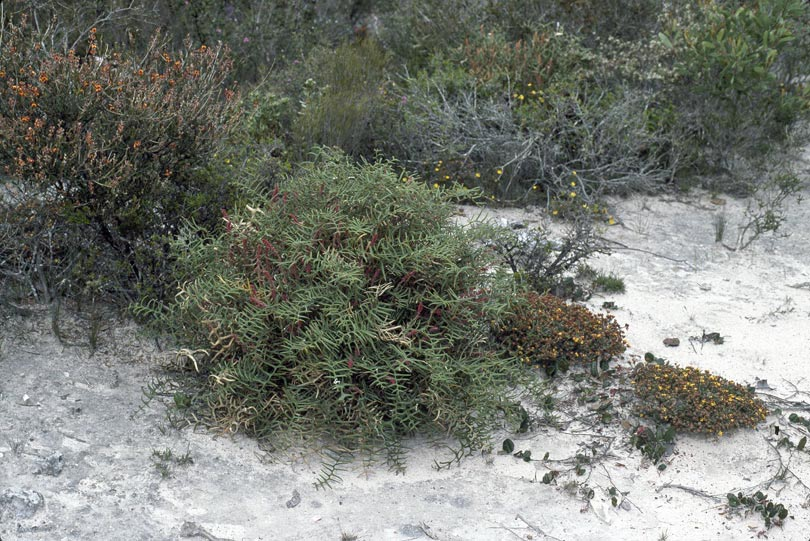
Habit (subsp. pteridifolia)

Banksia pteridifolia, commonly known as tangled honeypot, is a species of shrub that is endemic to the southwest of Western Australia. It has short, underground stems, deeply pinnatipartite leaves with sharply-pointed, linear lobes on the sides, creamy white or yellow flowers in heads of about one hundred and later up to five follicles in each head.

== Description ==
Banksia pteridifolia is a shrub that typically grows to about 1 m (3 ft 3 in) in diameter, with short underground stems and a lignotuber. It has deeply pinnatipartite leaves that are 170–500 mm (6.7–19.7 in) long and 50–120 mm (2.0–4.7 in) wide on a petiole 30–60 mm (1.2–2.4 in) long. There are between twenty and thirty-four sharply-pointed, linear lobes 1.5–5 mm (0.059–0.197 in) wide on each side of the leaves. Between ninety and one hundred creamy white, yellow or pinkish flowers are arranged in heads on the end of the stems, the heads surrounded by leaves. There are broadly egg-shaped, involucral bracts up to 20 mm (0.79 in) long and covered with rust-coloured, woolly hairs at the base of each head. The perianth is 36–39 mm (1.4–1.5 in) long and the pistil 38–53 mm (1.5–2.1 in) long. Flowering occurs from March to May or from September to October. Up to five egg-shaped follicles 17–18 mm (0.67–0.71 in) long form in each head.

== Taxonomy ==
Scottish botanist Robert Brown described the tangled honeypot as Dryandra pteridifolia in 1810, after collecting it in January 1802 from Lucky Bay on Western Australia's south coast. The description was published in Transactions of the Linnean Society of London.

In 1996, Alex George described two subspecies, subsp. pteridifolia and subsp. vernalis in the journal Nuytsia and in a later volume of the same journal, George described subspecies inretita.

In 2007 Austin Mast and Kevin Thiele transferred all dryandras to the genus Banksia and renamed this species Banksia pteridifolia and the subspecies pteridifolia, vernalis and inretita respectively. The names of the subspecies are accepted by the Australian Plant Census.

Banksia pteridifolia subsp. inretita differs from the other two in having the flower heads surrounded by short leaves with thread-like lobes. The other two subspecies do not have short leaves around the heads. Banksia pteridifolia subsp. pteridifolia has twisted leaf lobes, and flowers in autumn whereas B. pteridifolia subsp. vernalis has leaf lobes that are only slightly twisted, if at all, and flowers in spring.

== Distribution and habitat ==
All three subspecies of B. pteridifolia grow in kwongan. Subspecies inretita occurs between Lake Grace and Lake King. Subspecies pteridifolia is found between the Gairdner River, Cape Le Grand National Park and Newdegate and subsp. vernalis between Eneabba, the Moore River and Perth.

== Conservation status ==
Subspecies pteridifolia is listed as "not threatened" by the Western Australian Government Department of Parks and Wildlife but subsp. inretita is listed as "Priority Two" meaning that it is poorly known and from only one or a few locations and subsp. vernalis as "Priority Three" meaning that it is poorly known and known from only a few locations but is not under imminent threat.
