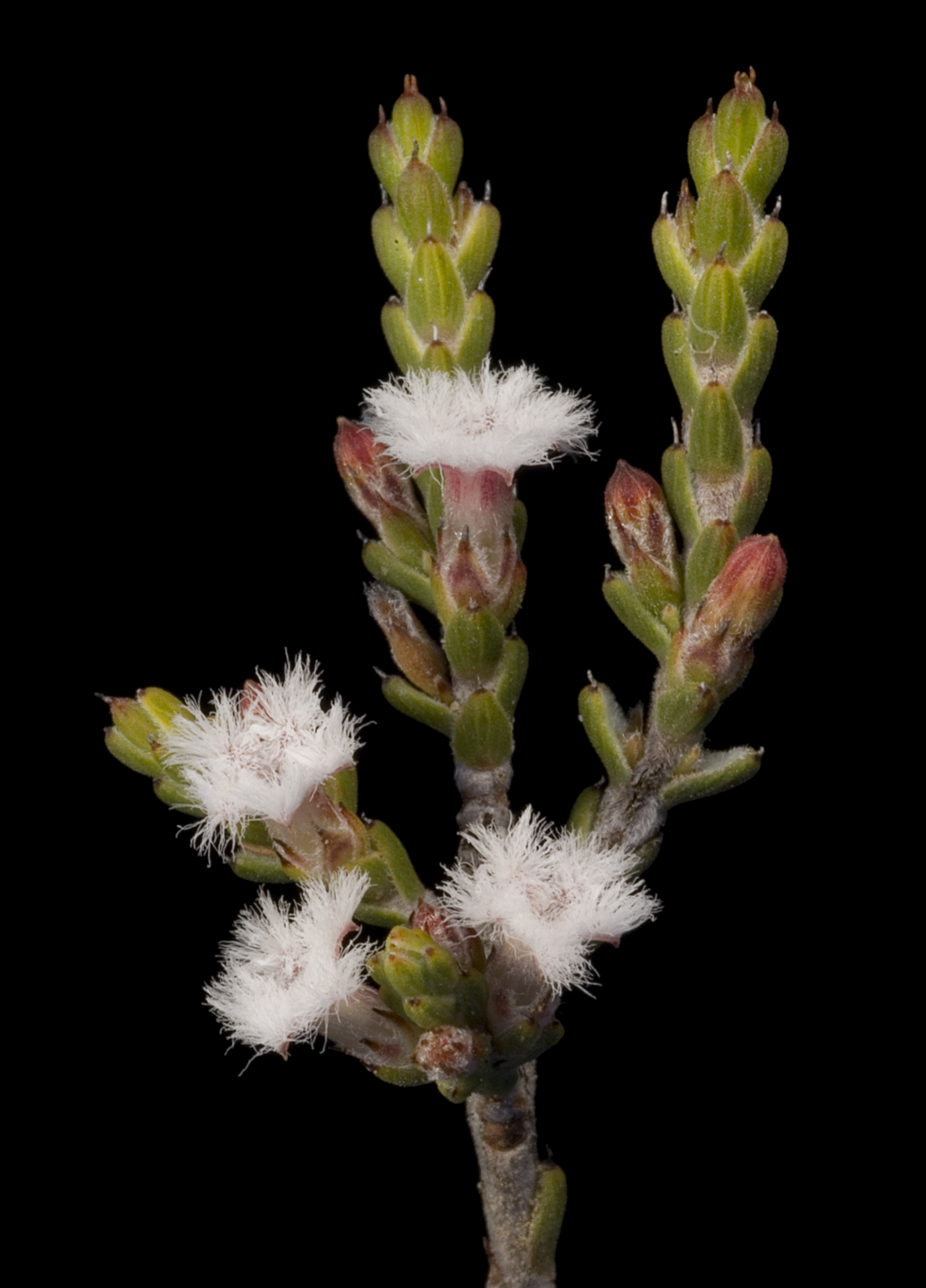

Scientific classification
- Kingdom: Plantae
- Clade: Tracheophytes
- Clade: Angiosperms
- Clade: Eudicots
- Clade: Asterids
- Order: Ericales
- Family: Ericaceae
- Genus: Styphelia
- Species: S. decussata

Binomial name
- Styphelia decussata Hislop, Crayn & Puente-Lel.

Synonyms
- Leucopogon tamminensis var. australis E.Pritz.

= Styphelia decussata =

Species of plant

Styphelia decussata is a species of flowering plant in the heath family Ericaceae and is endemic to the south-west of Western Australia.

It is a slender shrub with many branches, overlapping triangular to egg-shaped leaves, and white, tube-shaped flowers arranged singly in upper leaf axils. It was first formally described in 1904 by Ernst Georg Pritzel who gave it the name Leucopogon tamminensis var. australis in Botanische Jahrbücher für Systematik, Pflanzengeschichte und Pflanzengeographie.

In 2020, Michael Clyde Hislop, Darren M. Crayn and Caroline Puente-Lelievre transferred it to the genus Styphelia and raised it to species status. Since the name Styphelia australis was used for a different species, (Styphelia australis (R.Br.) F.Muell., now known as Leucopogon australis R.Br.) the species was given the name Styphelia decussata.

Styphelia decussata is widely distributed between Corrigin, Boxwood Hill and Munglinup in the Avon Wheatbelt, Esperance Plains and Mallee of south-western Western Australia.
