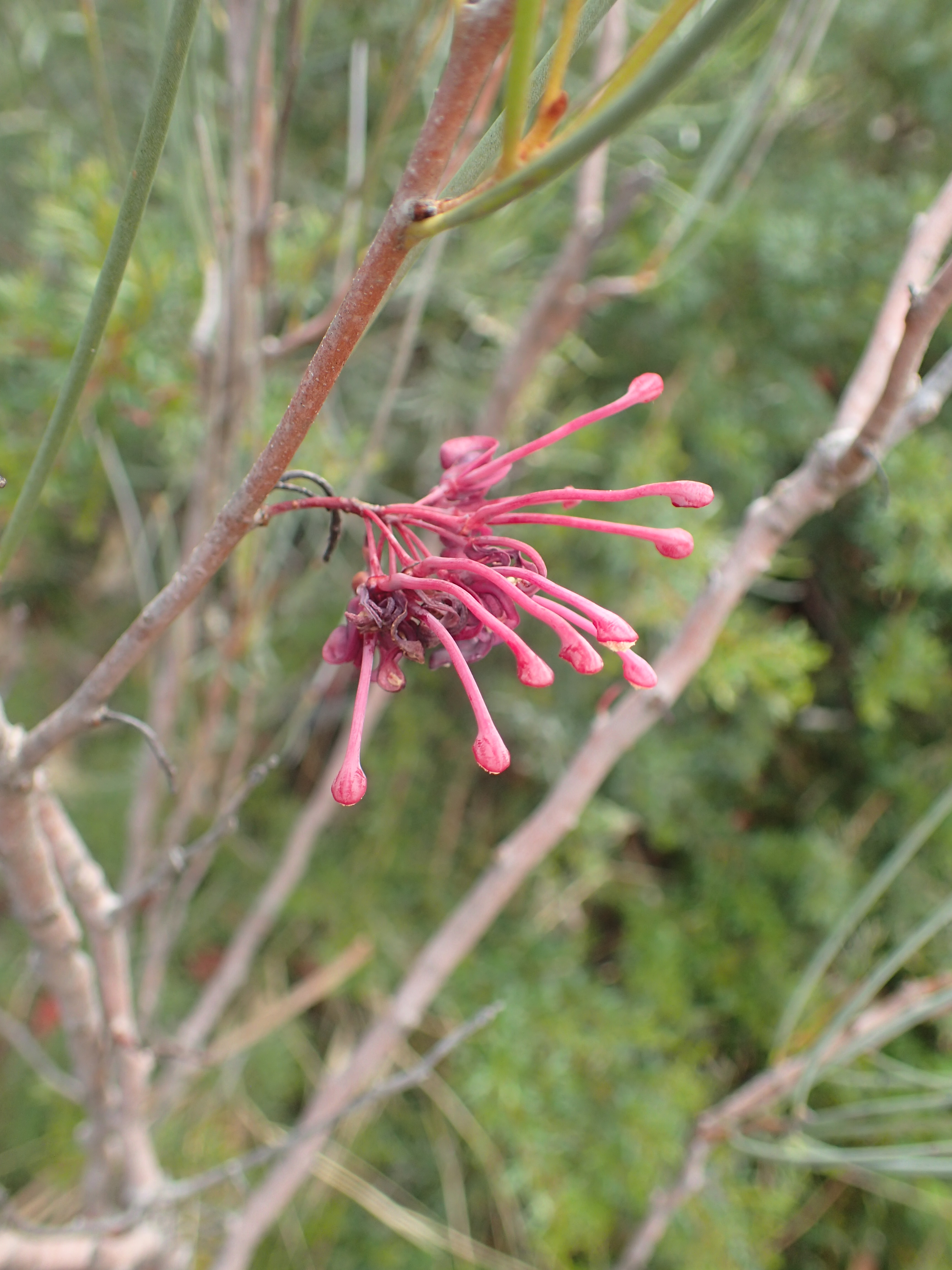
- Hakea strumosa flowers in Kings Park, Perth

Scientific classification
- Kingdom: Plantae
- Clade: Tracheophytes
- Clade: Angiosperms
- Clade: Eudicots
- Order: Proteales
- Family: Proteaceae
- Genus: Hakea
- Species: H. strumosa

Binomial name
- Hakea strumosa Meisn.
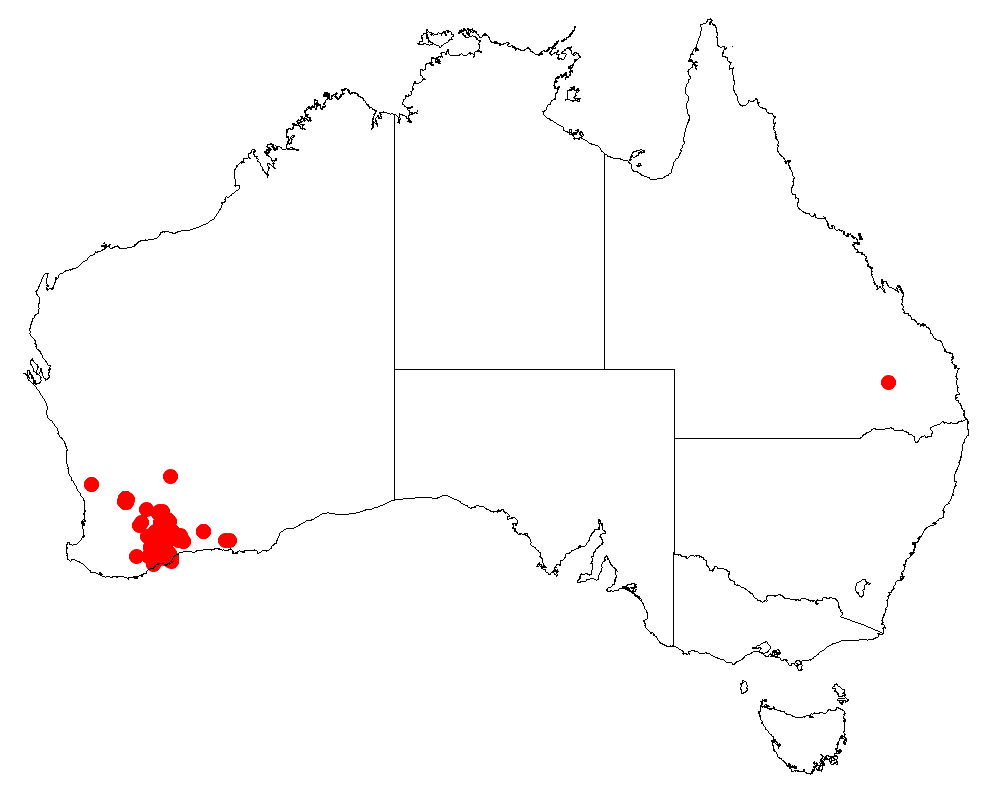
- Occurrence data from Australasian Virtual Herbarium

= Hakea strumosa =

Species of shrub endemic to Western Australia

Hakea strumosa is a shrub in the family Proteaceae endemic to an area in the Wheatbelt, Great Southern and the Goldfields-Esperance regions of Western Australia. A dense, very prickly shrub with a profusion of small, deep pink or red flowers in spring.

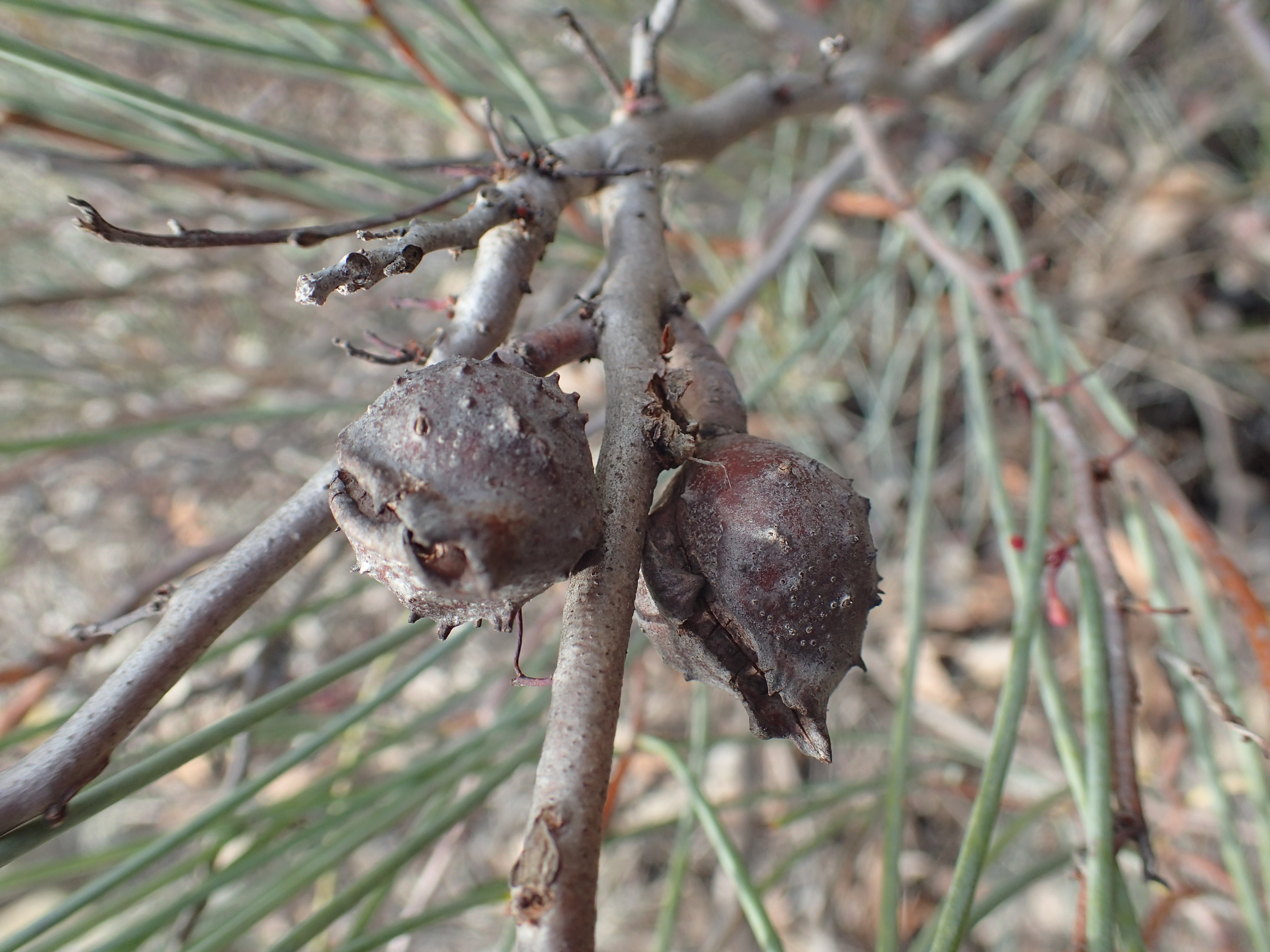
Fruit

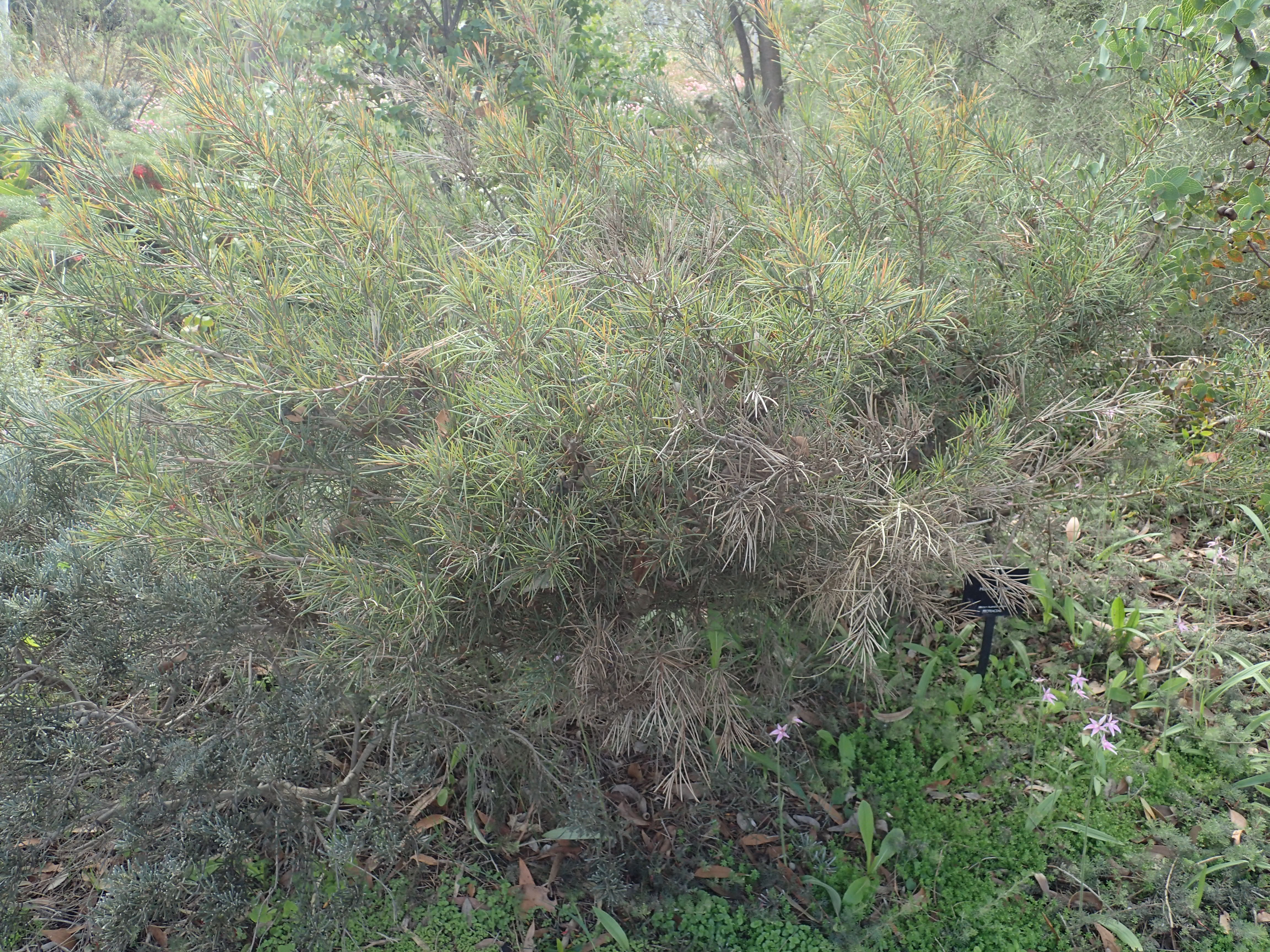
Habit in Kings Park

== Description ==
Hakea strumosa is a rounded, dense shrub typically growing to a height of 0.6 to 1.5 metres (2 to 5 ft) and 1–2 m (3–7 ft) wide and does not form a lignotuber. The branchlets and young leaves are smooth or has dense, flattened, rusty-coloured silky hairs. The leaves are stiff, needle-shaped 2.5–11 cm (0.98–4.33 in) long and 1.3–1.8 mm (0.051–0.071 in) wide ending in a long sharp point 1–4.8 mm (0.039–0.189 in) long. The inflorescence usually consists of 4 and occasionally 6-10 small, deep pink or red mildly scented flowers in axillary clusters along the upright branchlets. The individual flowers have overlapping bracts 0.7–2 mm (0.028–0.079 in) long and covered in coarse, rough hairs. The pedicel 2–3.5 mm (0.079–0.138 in) long and smooth, the pistil 6.5–8 mm (0.26–0.31 in) long. The red and yellow perianth is 3–4.2 mm (0.12–0.17 in) long, smooth and covered in a bluish-green powdery film. The large fruit are smooth with wrinkles, pear-shaped 3–6 cm (1–2 in) long and 2–3.5 cm (0.8–1 in) wide, ending in two small horns 2 mm (0.08 in) long. Flowering occurs from September to October.

== Taxonomy and naming ==
Hakea strumosa was first formally described by Carl Meisner in 1855 and published the description in Prodromus Systematis Naturalis Regni Vegetabilis. Named from the Latin strumosus - a reference to the thick stalk supporting the fruit.

== Distribution and habitat ==
This species is found growing in low heath on sand, sometimes over laterite from Tammin in the central wheatbelt, ranging south to Bremer Bay and Esperance.

== Conservation status ==
Hakea strumosa is classified as "not threatened" by the Western Australian Government Department of Parks and Wildlife.
