= Acacia binata =

Scientific classification
- Kingdom: Plantae
- Clade: Tracheophytes
- Clade: Angiosperms
- Clade: Eudicots
- Clade: Rosids
- Order: Fabales
- Family: Fabaceae
- Subfamily: Caesalpinioideae
- Clade: Mimosoid clade
- Genus: Acacia
- Species: A. binata

Binomial name
- Acacia binata Maslin
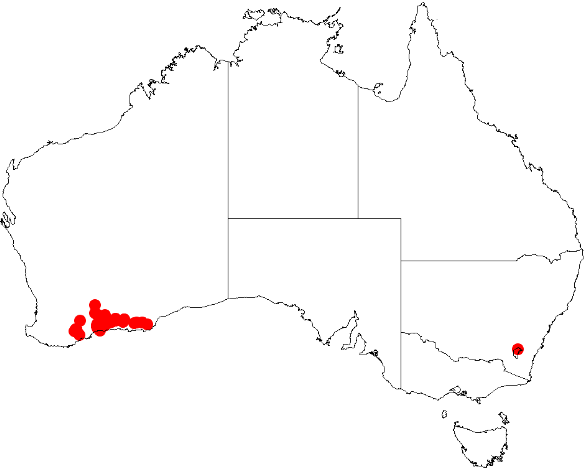
- Occurrence data from AVH

Synonyms
- Racosperma binatum (Maslin) Pedley

Species of shrub

Habit in Corackerup Nature Reserve, near Boxwood Hill

Acacia binata is a species of flowering plant in the family Fabaceae and is endemic to the south-west of Western Australia. It is a dense, domed, glabrous shrub with phyllodes that are more or less circular in cross section, spherical to slightly oblong heads of golden-yellow flowers, and curved or coiled wavy pods.

== Description ==
Acacia binata is a dense, domed, glabrous shrub that typically grows to a height of 0.25–1 m (9.8 in – 3 ft 3.4 in) with many branches at ground level at first. The phyllodes are fleshy, green, more or less circular in cross section 8–17 mm (0.31–0.67 in) long and 1.0–1.5 mm (0.039–0.059 in) wide with three obscure veins. The flowers are borne in pairs of spherical to slightly oblong heads in racemes on a peduncle 6–15 mm (0.24–0.59 in) long. Each head is 3.5–5 mm (0.14–0.20 in) in diameter with usually 10 to 20 golden-yellow flowers. Flowering occurs from August to October, and the pods are curved to irregularly coiled, firmly leathery to thinly crust-like, 35 mm (1.4 in) long and 3.0–3.5 mm (0.12–0.14 in) wide containing grey to grey-brown, oblong to elliptic or egg-shaped seeds 2.5–3 mm (0.098–0.118 in) long with a relatively large aril.

== Taxonomy ==
Acacia binata was first formally described in 1978 by Bruce Maslin in the journal Nuytsia from specimens he collected 12 km (7.5 mi) north-north-west of Ongerup in 1973. The specific epithet (binata) means 'born', referring to the racemes that are reduced to "twin peduncles".

== Distribution and habitat ==
This species of wattle has a discontinuous distribution in the Coolgardie, Esperance Plains and Mallee bioregions of south-western Western Australia where it is found in low-lying areas on undulating plains growing in rocky clay-loam soils. It is found from around Ongerup to Mount Beaumont, around 90 km (56 mi) north of Esperance.

== See also ==
- List of Acacia species
