= Goodenia stenophylla =

Conservation status
- Priority Four — Rare Taxa (DEC)

Scientific classification
- Kingdom: Plantae
- Clade: Tracheophytes
- Clade: Angiosperms
- Clade: Eudicots
- Clade: Asterids
- Order: Asterales
- Family: Goodeniaceae
- Genus: Goodenia
- Species: G. stenophylla

Binomial name
- Goodenia stenophylla F.Muell.

Synonyms
- Lobelia stenophylla (F.Muell.) Kuntze nom. illeg.; Scaevola stenophylla (F.Muell.) Benth.

Species of plant

Goodenia stenophylla is a species of flowering plant in the family Goodeniaceae and is endemic to the south-west coast of Western Australia. It is an erect shrub with linear or tapering leaves and racemes of white flowers with purplish spots.

== Description ==
Goodenia stenophylla is an erect, glabrous shrub that typically grows to a height of up to 1 m (3 ft 3 in). The leaves on the stems are linear or tapering, 18–30 mm (0.71–1.18 in) long and up to 0.5 mm (0.020 in) wide. The flowers are arranged in spikes up to 120 mm (4.7 in) long with bracts and linear bracteoles 1 mm (0.039 in) long. The sepals are egg-shaped to elliptic, 1 mm (0.039 in) long, the corolla white with purplish spots in the centre and 8–10 mm (0.31–0.39 in) long. The lower lobes of the corolla are 4.5–6 mm (0.18–0.24 in) long with wings about 0.8 mm (0.031 in) wide. Flowering occurs from September to January.

== Taxonomy and naming ==
Goodenia stenophylla was first formally described in 1859 by Ferdinand von Mueller in Fragmenta phytographiae Australiae. The specific epithet (stenophylla) means "narrow-leaved".

== Distribution ==
This goodenia grows on the steep sides of rocks from the Fitzgerald River National Park to Bremer Bay in the Esperance Plains biogeographic region.

== Conservation status ==
Goodenia stenophylla is classified as "Priority Four" by the Government of Western Australia Department of Parks and Wildlife, meaning that is rare or near threatened.
