= Mary Wellstead =

Australian stationmaster and telegraphist (1850–1894)

Wellstead with her husband John Harris

Grave of John and Ann Wellstead, pioneers of Bremer Bay and parents of Mary Wellstead, in the Memorial Park Cemetery, Albany

Mary Ann Isabella Wellstead (10 February 1850 – 13 December 1894) was an Australian telegraphist who was the first stationmaster and telegraph operator of the Bremer Bay Telegraph Station, and likely the first female telegraphist in Australia. She worked at the telegraph station from 1876 to 1881.

== Early life ==
Wellstead was born on 10 February 1850 in Albany, Western Australia to pioneer settler John Wellstead and Ann Amy Wellstead (née Crawford), and was the couple's first child. Wellstead grew up in Albany and worked on the family's property gardening, milking cows and making butter.

Wellstead's father assisted in developing the section of the Perth to Adelaide, East-West Telegraph Line between Albany and Bremer Bay, where a repeater station was eventually erected in 1875 overlooking the estuary.

== Bremer Bay Stationmaster ==
In 1876, at the age of 26 years, Wellstead was trained in Morse code by superintendent James Coates Fleming. Fleming then appointed her as the temporary stationmaster at Bremer Bay, as no suitable stationmasters were available at the time of commissioning, due to the remoteness of the station. She served as Stationmaster until the arrival of three permanent staff, J Lloyd (assistant), M Ring (linesman), and GP Stevens (stationmaster), in late 1877.

Wellstead continued working at the repeater station as a telegraph clerk and assistant until 1881, when she married shepherd and shearer John 'Jack' James Harris at St John's Church in Albany. Harris was also employed on the construction of the Overland Telegraph Line. The track for the road for telegraphs is named Wellstead Road.

== Later life ==
Wellstead and Harris moved to the outstation at Quaalup Valley shortly after marriage. Two years later their first child, John Wellstead Kent Harris, was born, and grew up to become the Harbour Master at Fremantle. In all, they had four children over the course of their thirteen years of marriage.

Wellstead died on the 13 December 1894 in her hometown of Albany. Both she and Jack Harris are buried in the Memorial Park Cemetery, Albany.
