= Bremer Marine Park =

Marine protected area off Western Australia

- IUCN category II (national park)
- Location within Western Australia
- Location: Western Australia
- Nearest city: Off the coast of Bremer Bay, Western Australia
- Coordinates: 34°45′S 119°50′E
- Area: 4,472 km^{2} (1,727 sq mi)
- Established: 14 December 2013
- Governing body: Director of National Parks
- Website: https://parksaustralia.gov.au/marine/parks/south-west/bremer

Bremer Marine Park is a marine park adjacent to Bremer Bay, on the south coast of Western Australia. It has an area of 4,472 km^{2} (1,727 sq mi) and reaches depths of 5,900 metres (19,400 ft). It was officially zoned as a national park under the Australian government's South-west Marine Parks Management Plan (2018), and thus protects numerous species of flora and fauna. This marine biodiversity (and the presence of orca) is the primary contributing factor to the area's popularity; ecotourism, whale watching, and other nature-related tourist activities bring various socioeconomic benefits to the local area and further solidify the importance of the marine park.

However, Bremer Marine Park is no less threatened by the same issues that affect marine ecosystems anywhere else, such as illegal fishing and dumping, as well as human disturbance of sensitive species of cetaceans, among other animals, potentially disrupting their natural behaviours (including reproduction). For these reasons, systems and legislations have been put into place to further protect the marine park and its ecosystems and biodiversity, and to continue allowing for scientific research and public appreciation and education.

== Marine life ==
=== Environment, flora and fauna ===
The environment, climate and location plays a key role in the activities, behaviours, survival and interactions of flora and fauna in Bremer Bay Marine Park, affecting whether the species in question is resident, migratory or otherwise.

The geomorphological construction of Bremer Canyon influences the currents and water movements, as well as upwelling of nutrients. Bremer Bay contains several different, interacting currents which are vital to the well-being of the species inhabiting the Marine Park. For example, the Leeuwin Current transports warmer, tropical waters across the southwestern coast of the continent, thus increasing the water temperature in Bremer. Currents also lead to the movement and transporting of tropical marine life from further afield; for example, the Leeuwin Current is significant to the movements of southern bluefin tuna, Western Australia salmon and migratory humpback whales, as well as many species of coral, which, in their early stages of life, float in the water column until finding an appropriate location to attach and live.

In conjunction with other water currents and the geomorphology of the marine park, 'eddies' are formed. These are circular currents which contribute to upwelling, which involves water from the depths rising, carrying with it sediment and nutrients from the seafloor, mixing with surface waters. In the Bremer Bay region, this nutrient increase fuels algal growth, and, in turn, benefits plankton and krill populations (predominantly through chlorophyll), which attract all the larger species to the area. These currents and upwellings are the cause of such high biological productivity in Bremer Bay's surface waters.

This biodiversity is evident in the variety of species found in the marine park. Numerous types of marine invertebrates and arthropods are present, including at least 20 species of cephalopods, 110 echinoderms, around 200 marine crustaceans (such as lobsters and crabs), and over 100 species of cnidarians. At least 40 types of sponges have been documented. These invertebrates, inevitably, attract over 400 species of bony fishes, such as blue groper, herring and trevally, in addition to the aforementioned tuna and salmon. There have been at least 40 species of elasmobranchs documented in these waters, including bronze whaler, great white, sand tiger, scalloped hammerhead, dusky, pencil, tiger, common blacktip, lemon, spinner, megamouth, gummy and blue sharks, bowmouth and white-spotted guitarfish, numerous rays and stingarees, as well as carpet sharks like the cobbler, western, dwarf spotted, floral-banded, gulf and spotted wobbegongs.

Seabirds are plentiful, with at least 60 types of wading or shorebirds inhabiting the area, as well as various shearwater, petrel, cormorant and albatross species. Additionally, the little penguin may be seen in some areas, as well as fiordland and southern rockhopper penguins. Marine reptiles, such as sea turtles, may also be observed—notably the green, hawksbill, and loggerhead species—, as well as the occasionally-sighted elegant and yellow-bellied sea snakes.

Marine mammals are drawn by the abundant resources of these waters, including pinnipeds like the Australian sea lion, long-nosed and brown fur seals, and the southern elephant seal; less commonly seen, though occasionally, are leopard seals, likely rogue individuals or Antarctic vagrants from further south. Cetaceans are a relatively common sight, with the largest including southern right, sperm, strap-toothed, blue and common minke whales, as well as pods of long-finned pilot whales, Indo-Pacific and common bottlenose dolphins, striped and common dolphins, in addition to the aforementioned humpback and killer whales. Other cetaceans include the pygmy sperm whale and Risso's dolphin.

=== Food webs ===
The interrelationship between organisms was investigated by the University of Western Australia and the Australian government. The defining features of the ecosystems food web include the apex predator being the orca, the keystone species being the squid and krill and the main primary producer being phytoplankton.

Primary role in food web		
Apex predator	Blue shark: Prionace glauca feeding in Bremer MP	
Keystone species	Squid: Cock-eyed squid, which has been reported at Bremer Bay	Krill: Krill compared with a finger, indicating its small size
Primary producer	Phytoplankton: Microscopic view depicting mixed phytoplankton. Chlorophyll (green colour of community) is an indicator that phytoplankton are primary producers.	

== Threats to biodiversity ==
=== Climate change and global warming ===
Global warming since 1850 confirmed from various sources. In this chart, the "0" value is the global average temperature from 1850–1900, which is considered the "pre-industrial" global average temperature level.

Climate change is defined as the long term change in weather patterns allowing for Earth's climate to change. Evidence for the Earth's cycle between hothouse and icehouse climates can be found using sedimentation and greenhouse gas data. Global Warming is the scientific theory that humans are raising the Earth's temperature primarily through increasingly burning fossil fuels causing the Earth to trap greenhouse gases which raises the Earth's temperature.

Both climate change and global warming would further cause ocean: temperature levels, acidity and greenhouse gas levels to rise. In turn, this would cause many of the existing flora and fauna to perish or migrate elsewhere. For example, scientists predict that global warming will decrease the abundance of phytoplankton (a keystone species in the Bremer Marine Park food web) in oceans.

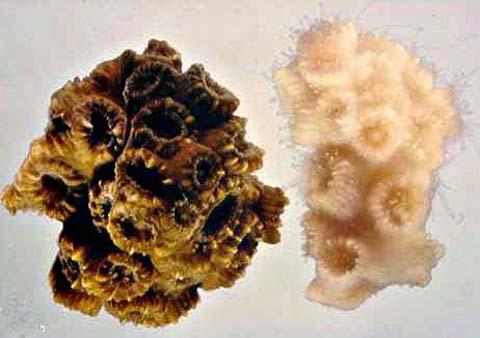
Healthy coral seen on the left. Unhealthy and bleached coral seen on the right.

However, some individuals dispute the existence of global warming. The main argument is due to the belief that humans are not impacting temperature, and the temperature increase is only resultant from the natural cycle of Earth's climate between hothouse and icehouse periods. This opinion is less popular among the scientific community due to the compelling evidence against it.

Climate change and global warming also have the ability to disrupt coral more commonly found at Bremer Bay, which will further disrupt food webs and chains. This is because increased temperatures lead to zooxanthellae algae leaving corals. This leads to corals having inadequate nutritional supply, further causing coral bleaching and coral death.

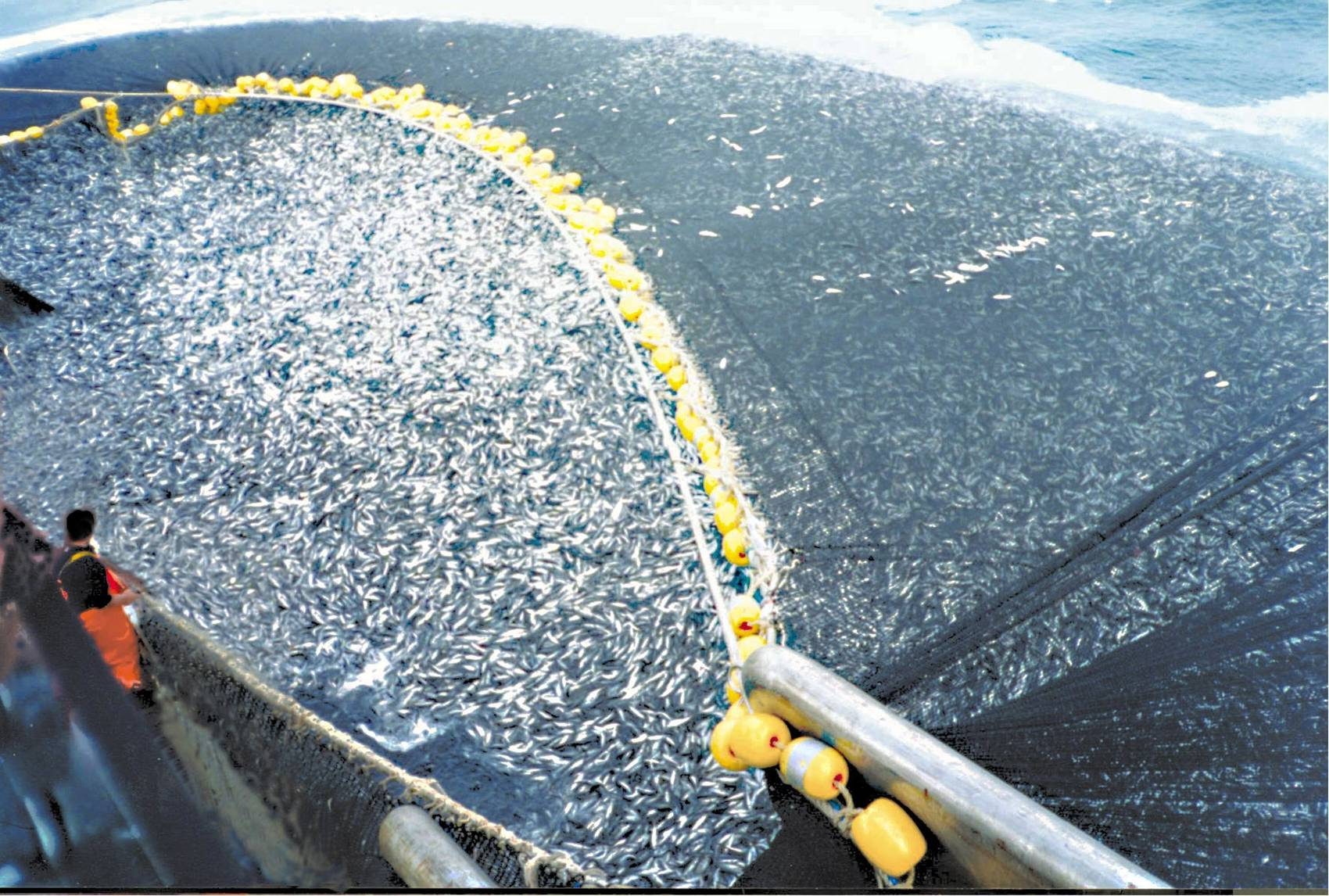
An example of overfishing, this needs to stay well monitored in Bremer Marine Park

=== Fishing ===
Fishing is a threat to biodiversity in marine areas, and is addressed as a threat to biodiversity in Bremer during a study by the National Environmental Science Programme. This is because fishing will disrupt both food webs and food chains. This is highly significant when keystone species (squid and krill) or apex predators (orca) are removed from the ecosystem. Overfishing is also a major threat to marine ecosystems, since it can both wipe out populations and significantly pollute oceans through oil and fuel leakage.

== Management ==
=== Management plan ===
The Australian Marine Parks South-west Network Management plan acts to preserve the Bremer Marine Park ecosystem and maintain its biodiversity in accordance with Cultural, Heritage Socio-economic and Natural values. Bremer Bay Marine Park is listed as an IUCN category II national park and was proclaimed under EPBC Act. The IUCN protects two areas in the Marine Park being the national park and special purpose zone. Both the IUCN and EPBC Act contribute to the protection of the environment and biodiversity in Bremer Marine Park.

==== Natural values ====
Bremer Bay contains two key ecological features being the 'Albany Canyon group and adjacent shelf break', and the 'Ancient Coastline at 90-120 metres depth contour'. The Albany Canyon group and adjacent shelf break includes Bremer Canyon which hosts many species of marine life. This is most likely due to upwelling events in the Canyon. Upwelling in the canyon is evidenced by higher levels of chlorophyll found in surface water. This is a possible indicator that nutrients have been upwelled to the surface. Higher concentrations of chlorophyll often lead to higher levels of productivity in oceans. This provides reasoning for the abundance of marine life in Bremer Bay Canyons.

The Ancient Coastline contains terraces and steps due to changes in sea level. The most prevalent steps and terraces can form large escarpments which can induce small upwelling events, which as previously mentioned cause higher abundance of marine life.

The Bremer Marine Park also contains two significant bioregions forming parts of the Southern Province and Southwest Shelf Province. The Southwest Shelf Province is an area significantly impacted by the Leeuwin Current. This area is hence a diverse area for organisms as mentioned in the environment, flora and fauna section. The Southern Province is populated by numerous deep submarine canyons reaching depths of approximately 5900m.

Species and habitats are also highly significant to Bremer Bay and are mentioned above in the Environment, flora and fauna section.

==== Heritage values ====
The heritage values for individuals and communities is found in socioeconomic and communal activities. For example, activities including fishing, whale and shark watching all contribute to heritage value. However, Bremer Marine Park has no official heritage listings.

==== Social and economic values ====
Economic values are predominantly in tourism activities, commercial fishing and mining. In terms of social activities, tourism offers snorkelling, fishing, whale watching and more wildlife orientated activities.

==== Cultural values ====
The Indigenous community has been sustainably using the Western Australian land and sea for between 40,000 and 100,000 years. In Bremer Marine Park the Noongar people are responsible for the 'Sea Country'. Sea Country includes all aspects of the area and is described by the government as including: 'all living things, beliefs, values, creation, spirits and cultural obligations connected to that area.' The Sea Country is valuable to the area and should be respected to all individuals. Many marine species are also 'totems' for Indigenous people and are hence valuable and require protection.

Hence, cultural values are superintended by the Noongar people and the South West Aboriginal Land and Sea Council.

== Tourism ==
Tourism in Bremer Marine Park is primarily through boat tours for whale watching and the easy accessibility to boats via Bremer Bay. Tourists are attracted to the Marine Park due to its abundance of marine life and geological structures. The Bremer Marine Park is specifically an ideal location for tourists due to its reputation to have high quantities of orca. The Bremer Canyon region hosts nearly 200 orca making it the largest known congregation point for orca in the southern hemisphere.

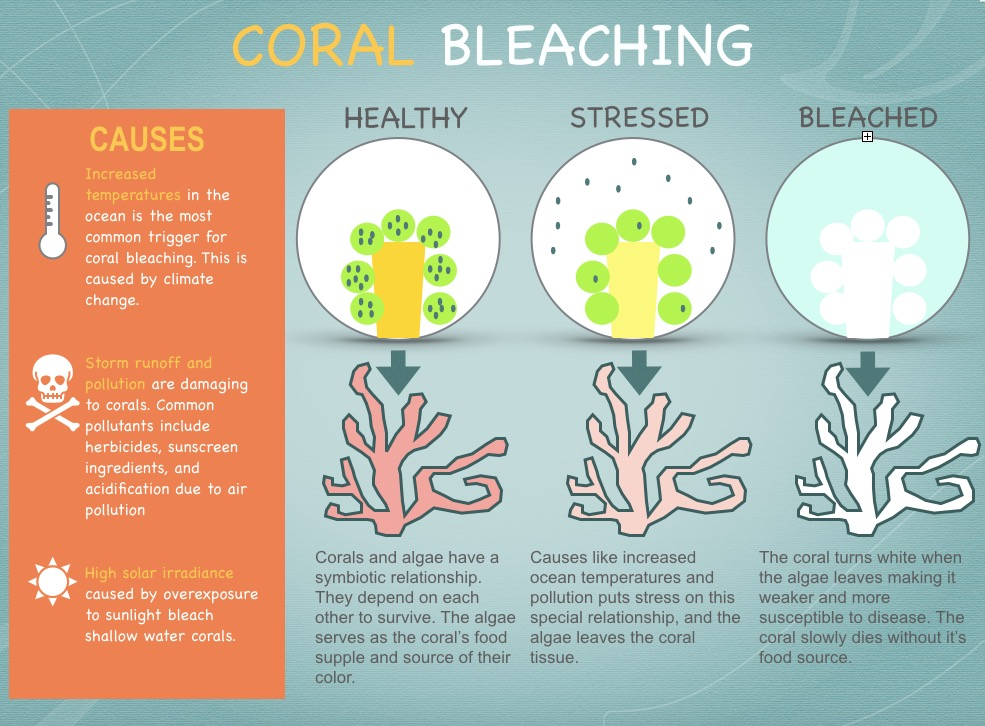
Coral bleaching process, where zooxanthellae act are the algae

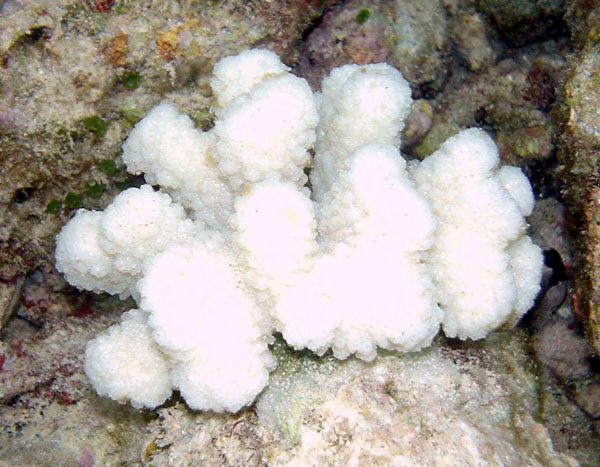
Example of bleached coral as indicated by the white colour

Tourism in Bremer Marine Park can be positive in educating the public about the importance of marine life, especially during expeditions. For example, many tourism boats will include tour guides who either are experts in the field or have a passion for wildlife. These individuals will educate tourists about individual animals, importance of biodiversity or even coral bleaching and climate change.

However tourism can also be a threat to biodiversity due to boats creation of underwater noise and fuel leakages. Individuals may also leave waste such as plastics or pollute the ocean with sunscreen which can change the ocean's acidity. Changes in ocean acidity can be detrimental for wildlife, especially corals. If the ocean water becomes too acidic, zooxanthellae algae cells will leave corals. Zooxanthellae cells are responsible for coral survival because they use photosynthesis to produce food for the coral. Hence, when zooxanthellae cells leave corals, corals bleach and eventually die. This will change ecosystem dynamics in Bremer Bay which will further lead to change in food webs and biodiversity in Bremer Marine Park.

== Exploration ==
Marine scientists have been conducting research on megafauna in Bremer Marine Park for over a decade. However, overall, the area is a relatively new area of exploration for scientists, however its abundance of marine life and biodiversity is becoming increasingly recognised.

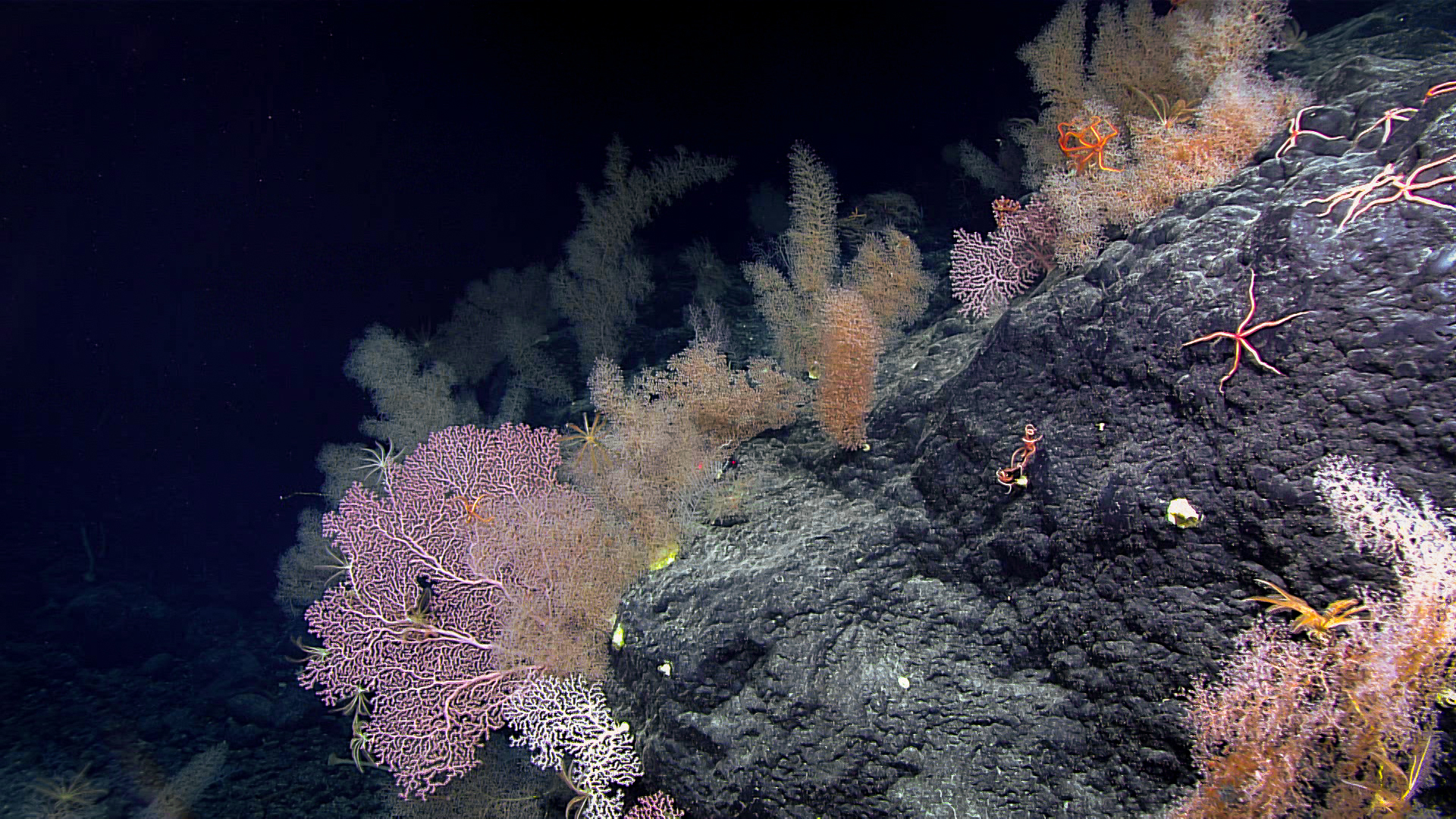
Example of deep sea coral garden

From October 2016 to April 2017, numerous researchers set out to observe various species' interactions with both the biotic and abiotic environment. Specifically, scientists attempted to construct a food web showing the main interactions between species and their abiotic and biotic environment. Scientists in this investigation concluded that both ocean processes and human activity impacted food webs (as previously mentioned in this article, under 'Marine life', 'Threats to biodiversity' and 'Tourism'). From 2016 to 2020, scientists continued to collect data on orca populations, pelagic fish and abiotic factors (such as oxygen, chlorophyll a and temperature) in the Bremer Marine Park area.

In February 2021, the University of Western Australia published their findings on the deep-sea exploration of Bremer Canyon by the Schmidt Ocean Institute RV Falkor; scientists discovered significant deep-sea coral gardens. These deep-sea coral colonies obtain their sustenance utilising currents for food particles, such as the Leeuwin Current. These currents also allow for more adequate water temperatures and oxygenation, vital for coral growth.

== See also ==
- Protected areas managed by the Australian government
