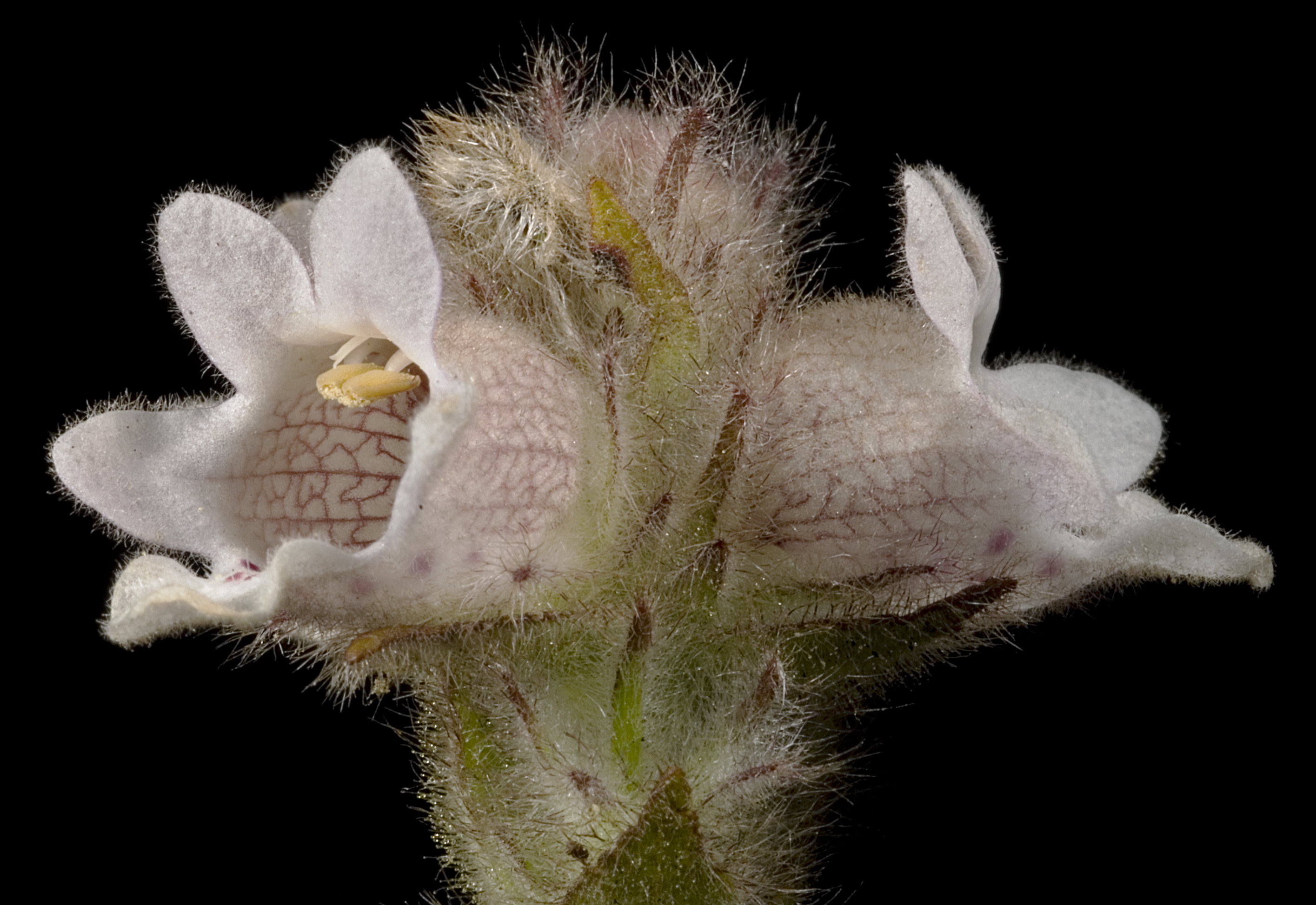
- Flower of Hemiphora bartlingii

Scientific classification
- Kingdom: Plantae
- Clade: Tracheophytes
- Clade: Angiosperms
- Clade: Eudicots
- Clade: Asterids
- Order: Lamiales
- Family: Lamiaceae
- Subfamily: Prostantheroideae
- Genus: Hemiphora (F.Muell.) F.Muell.

Species
- See text

= Hemiphora =

Genus of flowering plants

Hemiphora is a genus of five species of flowering plants in the mint family, Lamiaceae and is endemic to Western Australia. Plants in this genus are woolly shrubs with warty, hairy leaves and with five petals joined to form a tube-shaped flower with four stamens. These species are similar to those in the genus Chloanthes in that the base of the leaves extends down the stem. They differ from Chloanthes, in that the leaves only extend a short distance down the stem.

== Description ==
Plants in the genus Hemiphora are evergreen shrubs which have their stems, leaves and parts of their flowers densely covered with woolly hairs. The leaves are simple and are arranged in opposite pairs or in whorls of three, covered with woolly hairs and small blisters. The leaves appear narrow because their edges are turned under, so that the lower surface of the leaf is not visible. The flowers are arranged singly in leaf axils and are surrounded by leaf-like bracts and two bracteoles. Flowers have five sepals which are joined at their base to form a very short tube with five lobes. The five petals are joined to form a curved tube with five lobes, the lower lobe roughly triangular in shape, the two side lobes and the upper two all similar in size and shape. There are four stamens sometimes with the lower pair shorter than the upper ones or sterile.

== Taxonomy and naming ==
In 1876, Ferdinand von Mueller described Chloanthes elderi and placed it in the section Chloanthes sect. Hemiphora. In 1882, Mueller raised Hemiphora to genus so that Hemiphora elderi became the type species of the new genus. In 2011, Barry Conn, Murray Henwood and Nicola Streiber transferred four species, previously in the genus Pityrodia into Hemiphora.

== Distribution ==
All species of Hemiphora are endemic to Western Australia.

The species are:

- Hemiphora bartlingii (Lehm.) B.J.Conn & Henwood
- Hemiphora elderi (F.Muell.) F.Muell
- Hemiphora exserta (Benth.) B.J.Conn & Henwood
- Hemiphora lanata (Munir) B.J.Conn & Henwood
- Hemiphora uncinata (Turcz.) B.J.Conn & Henwood
