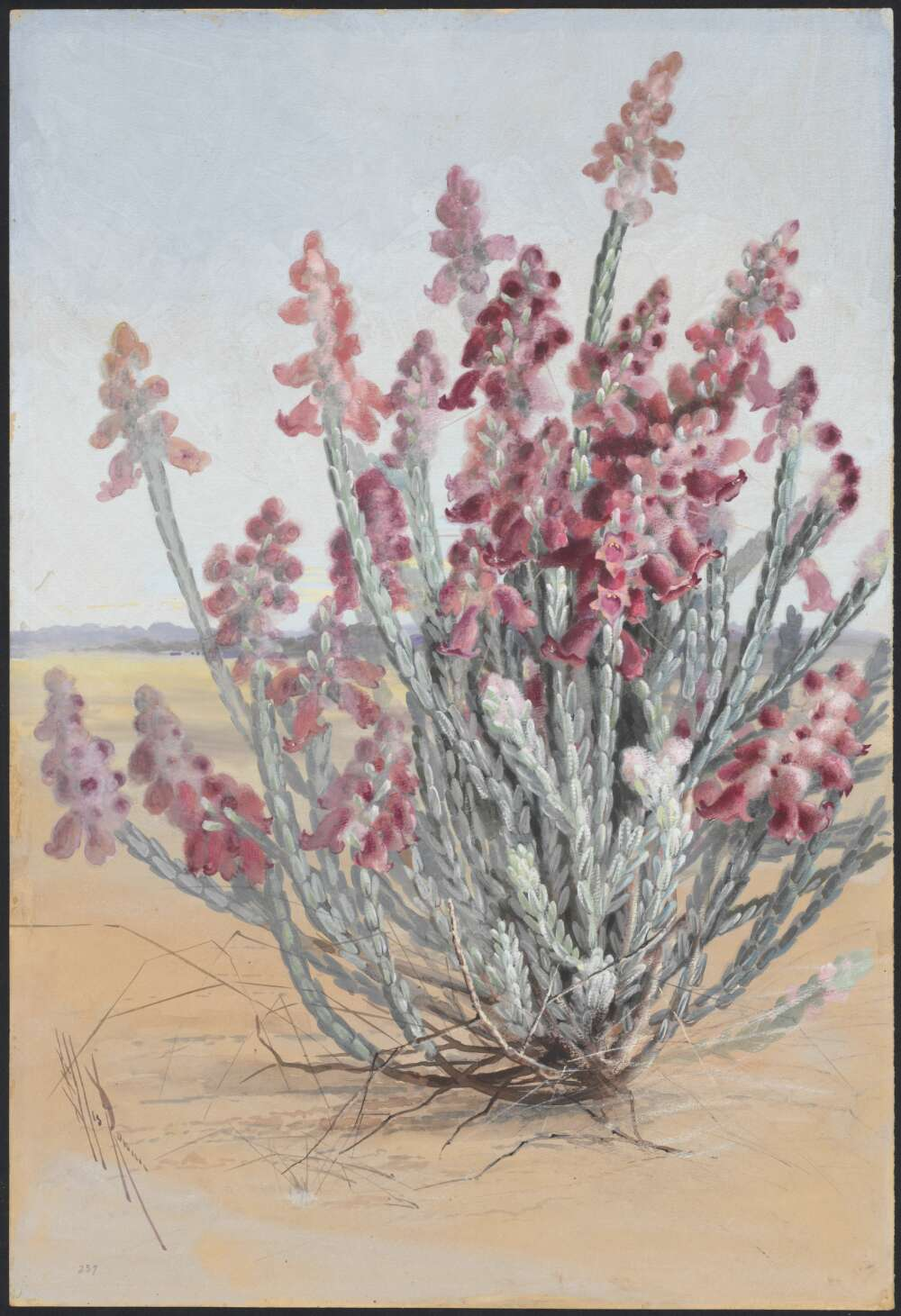
- Painting of H. elderi by Ellis Rowan

Scientific classification
- Kingdom: Plantae
- Clade: Tracheophytes
- Clade: Angiosperms
- Clade: Eudicots
- Clade: Asterids
- Order: Lamiales
- Family: Lamiaceae
- Genus: Hemiphora
- Species: H. elderi

Binomial name
- Hemiphora elderi (F.Muell.) F.Muell.
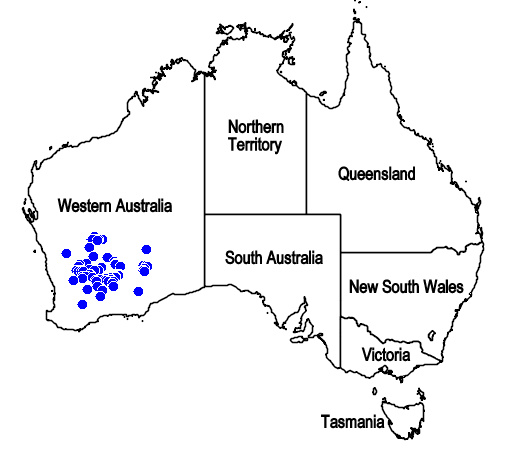

= Hemiphora elderi =

Red velvet

Species of flowering plant

Hemiphora elderi, commonly known as red velvet, is a flowering plant in the mint family Lamiaceae and is endemic to the south-west of Western Australia. It is a small shrub with its leaves densely covered with white, woolly hairs and with small clusters of reddish-purple, bell-shaped flowers.

== Description ==
Hemiphora elderi is shrub which grows to a height of about 0.3–0.45 m (10–20 in) with several branches arising from a single main stem. The leaves are pale green, linear to lance-shaped, but often appear almost cylindrical because their edges are strongly turned under. The leaves are 10–15 mm (0.4–0.6 in) long, 3–4 mm (0.1–0.2 in) wide, densely covered with white, woolly hairs, warty on the upper surface and with the lower surface often obscured by the rolled leaf edges.

The flowers are arranged in short, leafy, spike-like clusters near the ends of the branches, on short woolly stalks. The flowers are surrounded by woolly, leaf-like bracts 7–9 mm (0.3–0.4 in) long and bracteoles 3–4 mm (0.1–0.2 in) long, glabrous on the upper surface and densely woolly underneath. The five sepals are 8–10 mm (0.3–0.4 in) long, densely covered with reddish-purple, woolly hairs on their outer surface, mostly glabrous inside and joined to form a short tube near their bases. The petals are 15–22 mm (0.6–0.9 in) long and joined for most of their length to form a tube which is reddish-purple coloured or occasionally yellow. The petal tube is hairy outside, mostly glabrous inside except for a hairy ring near the ovary. The five petal lobes are joined to form two "lips", the upper lip with two lobes and longer than the lower one which has three lobes. The upper lip is 5–7 mm (0.2–0.3 in) long and 6–8 mm (0.2–0.3 in) wide. There are four stamens but the lower two are sterile and do not extend beyond the end of the petal tube. The upper fertile pair extend beyond the end of the petal tube. Flowering occurs from July to November and the fruit is almost spherical, hairy and about 3 mm (0.1 in) in diameter.

== Taxonomy and naming ==
This species was first formally described in 1876 by Ferdinand von Mueller and given the name Chloanthes elderi. The description was published in Fragmenta phytographiae Australiae. In 1882 Mueller changed the name to Hemiphora elderi. This species was the only one in the genus Hemiphora until 2011, when Barry Conn, Murray Henwood and Nicola Streiber transferred four species, previously in the genus Pityrodia into Hemiphora. The specific epithet (elderi) honours the philanthropist and pastoralist, Sir Thomas Elder.

== Distribution and habitat ==
Hemiphora elderi is found between Sandstone and Menzies in the north to the Parker Range and upper reaches of the Blackwood River in the south and from Victoria Springs in the east to Cunderdin and Lake Moore in the west. It occurs in the Avon Wheatbelt, Coolgardie, Great Victoria Desert, Mallee, Murchison and Yalgoo biogeographic regions where it grows in sand and gravelly sand on undulating plains.

== Conservation ==
Hemiphora elderi is classified as "not threatened" by the Western Australian Government Department of Parks and Wildlife.
