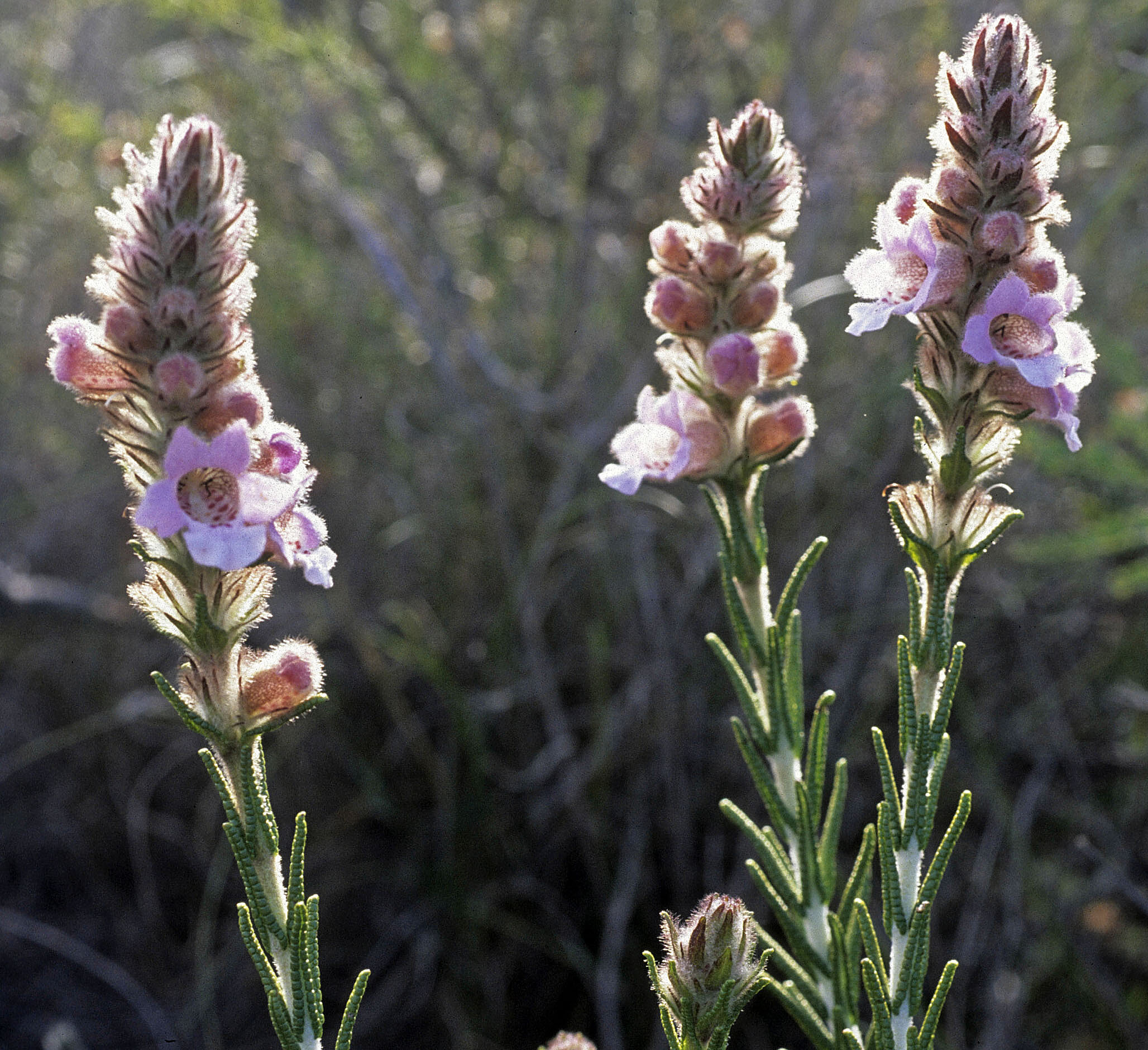

Scientific classification
- Kingdom: Plantae
- Clade: Tracheophytes
- Clade: Angiosperms
- Clade: Eudicots
- Clade: Asterids
- Order: Lamiales
- Family: Lamiaceae
- Genus: Hemiphora
- Species: H. bartlingii

Binomial name
- Hemiphora bartlingii (Lehm.) B.J.Conn & Henwood
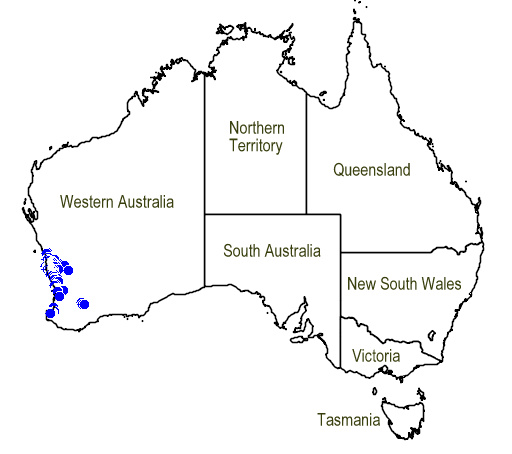

Synonyms
- Chloanthes bartlingii Lehm.; Pityrodia bartlingii (Lehm.) Benth.

= Hemiphora bartlingii =

Woolly dragon

Species of flowering plant

Hemiphora bartlingii, commonly known as woolly dragon, is a species of flowering plant in the mint family Lamiaceae and is endemic to the south-west of Western Australia. It is an erect shrub with branches covered with greyish, rusty-coloured hairs, leaves with a blistered appearance and with white, pink or purple flowers over an extended period.

== Description ==
Hemiphora bartlingii is shrub which grows to a height of about 0.3–0.9 m (1–3 ft) and has branches that are densely covered with greyish, rusty-coloured hairs. The leaves are linear to lance-shaped, but often appear almost cylindrical because their edges are strongly turned under. The leaves are 3–4 cm (1–2 in) long, 3–5 mm (0.1–0.2 in) wide with a blistered upper surface and a hairy lower surface.

The flowers are arranged singly or in groups of up to three in leaf axils near the ends of the branches, on woolly stalks 2–4 mm (0.08–0.2 in) long. The flowers are surrounded by leafy, linear to lance-shaped, woolly bracts and bracteoles which are densely woolly on the outer surface, less so on the inner side. The bracts are 15–25 mm (0.6–1 in) long and longer than the sepals. The five sepals are 8–13 mm (0.3–0.5 in) long, linear to lance-shaped, woolly on their outer surface and joined to form a short tube near their bases. The petals are 15–23 mm (0.6–0.9 in) long and joined for most of their length to form a broad tube which is white, pink or purple with purple spots inside. The outside of the petal tube has a few short hairs but glabrous on the inside except for a narrow ring of hairs around the ovary. There are five lobes on the end of the tube, the lower, central lobe elliptic to almost round, 6–9 mm (0.2–0.4 in) long and 7–11 mm (0.3–0.4 in) wide and much larger than the other lobes which are a similar size and shape to each other. The four stamens are shorter than the tube, the lower pair slightly longer than the upper ones. Flowering occurs in most months and the fruit is oval-shaped and 3–4 mm (0.1–0.2 in) with the sepals remaining attached.

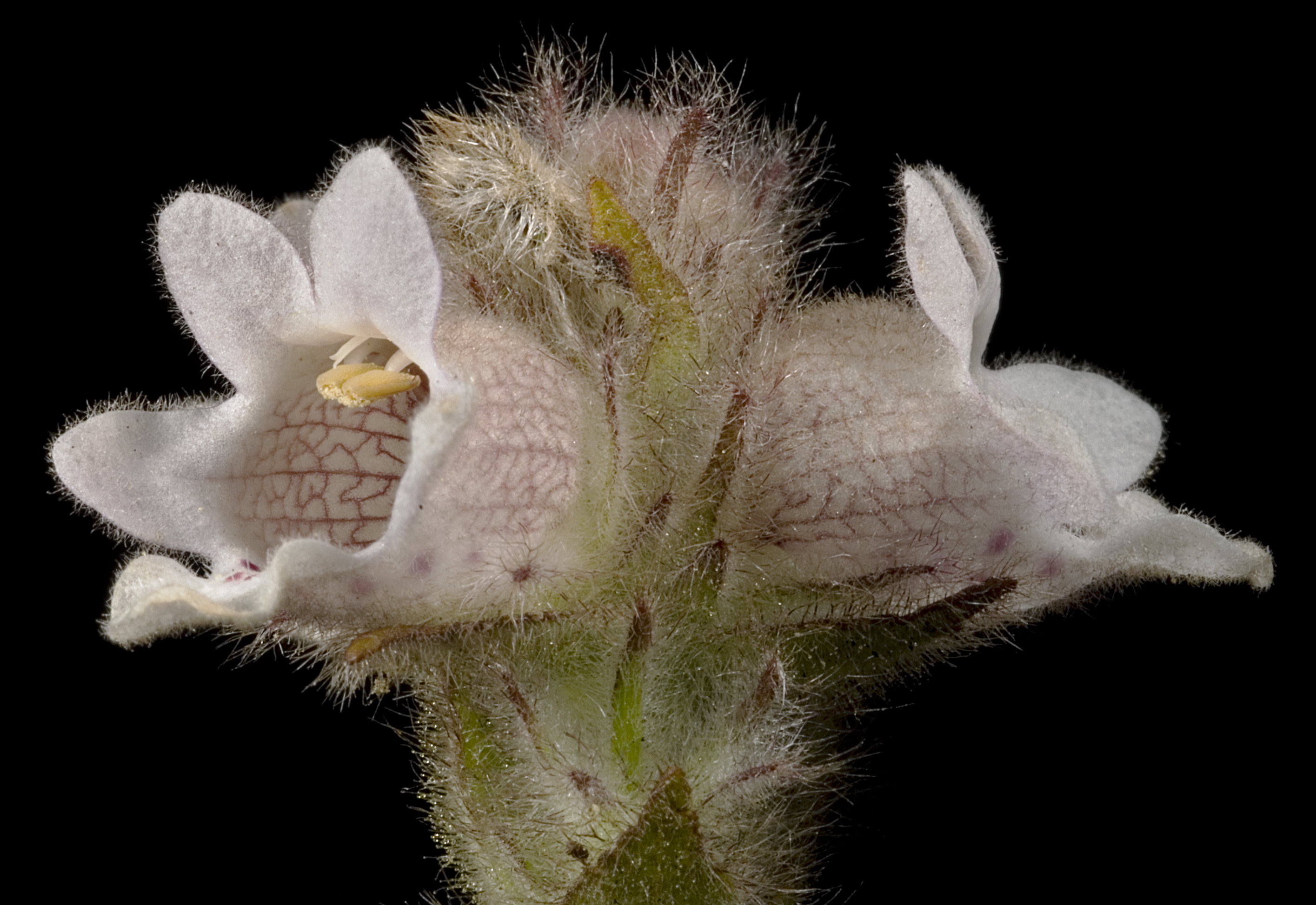
Close up of flowers

== Taxonomy and naming ==
This species was first formally described in 1844 by Johann Lehmann and given the name Chloanthes bartlingii. The description was published in Delectus Seminum quae in Horto Hamburgensium botanico e collectione. In 1870 George Bentham changed the name to Pityrodia bartlingii and in 2011, Barry Conn, Murray Henwood and Nicola Streiber changed it to the present name. The specific epithet (bartlingii) honours the German botanist Friedrich Gottlieb Bartling.

== Distribution ==
Woolly dragon mostly occurs to the north of Perth but is found between Busselton and the Murchison River, sometimes as far east as Yellowdine. It grows in sandy kwongan and woodland in the Geraldton Sandplains, Swan Coastal Plain, Avon Wheatbelt, Jarrah Forest and Mallee biogeographic regions.

== Conservation ==
Hemiphora bartlingii is classified as "not threatened" by the Western Australian Government Department of Parks and Wildlife.
