= Gordon Inlet =

Estuarine inlet in Western Australia

- Interactive map of Gordon Inlet
- Coordinates: 34°17′07″S 119°28′55″E
- Country: Australia
- State: Western Australia
- LGA: Shire of Jerramungup

Gordon Inlet is an estuarine inlet, located in the Great Southern region of Western Australia. The inlet is at the south west corner of the Fitzgerald River National Park and approximately 15 kilometres (9 mi) north west of the town of Bremer Bay.

The estuary is transient and is quite shallow with a high rate of evaporation so that the estuary often dries out almost completely. The water is saline with salinity levels varying from slightly less than seawater to over four times as saline.

The Gairdner River flows into the inlet and discharges an average of 9.4 million cubic metres (332 million cu ft) per annum.

The inlet is wave dominated and functions primarily as a result of wave energy. It has a total surface area of 6.4 square kilometres (2 sq mi), the majority of which is made up of the main basin and the estuary barriers with a small area of salt marsh and intertidal flats. The main seagrass species found in the estuary is Ruppia maritima.

The inlet was named in 1848 by Surveyor-General of Western Australia John Septimus Roe after Gordon Gairdner, Senior Clerk of the Australian and Eastern Departments in the Colonial Office, later Chief Clerk of the Colonial Office and Secretary and Registrar of the Most Distinguished Order of Saint Michael and Saint George. Roe also named the Gairdner River and Mount Gordon after Gairdner.
