= George Phillip Stevens =

Australian public servant

George Phillip Stevens (24 June 1861 – 20 November 1941) was a senior public servant, transitioning from the State Post and Telegraph Department to the Federal Department following Federation. In later years he was secretary of the State Civil Service Association. But he was best known for having conducted the earliest wireless experiments in the State of Western Australia.

== Early life and family ==
Stevens was born 24 June 1861 at Keynsham, Somerset, England and was the youngest of a family who arrived in Western Australia on 5 August 1868 on board the Palestine. Stevens married Ann Elizabeth Graham (born 8 June 1863) on 23 December 1884 at South Australia. They had three sons and five daughters.

== Professional career ==
At 13 years old Stevens entered the telegraph service as a messenger at Toodyay. Twenty years of Mr. Stevens's life were passed on the south coast as telegraph stationmaster at Bremer Bay, Israelite Bay and Eucla. From the latter station he controlled the traffic during the boom days of the goldfields. From there he was recalled to Perth in 1896 to assume the management of the telegraph department from the central office, and after its transfer to the Commonwealth service in 1901 he was appointed electrical engineer. He retired from the service in 1906. In 1908 Stevens became secretary of the Civil Service Association, and held the position until he retired in November, 1932.

=== Wireless experiments ===
Western Australia, was slow to engage in wireless telegraphy experiments, but there was public outcry in response to a number of marine disasters on the Western Australian coast in 1898. A need for communication between the Rottnest Island lighthouse and Fremantle Port (16 miles) was identified. In January 1899, W. J. Hancock (Government electrician) suggested that wireless telegraphy could be employed for the task at much lower cost than submarine cable and noted that greater distances had already been achieved in England. In May 1899, Stevens announced that preliminary tests had just been completed in a workshop environment and provided a comprehensive description of the equipment which was described as simple. Two further marine disasters of the W.A. coast in July 1899, forced the Government to act immediately and an order for submarine cables was placed. Nevertheless, wireless experiments continued. Various difficulties were encountered in extending transmission distance, but in September 1899, Stevens announced that reliable transmissions were now being achieved across 5 rooms in the basement of the Telegraph Office. It was further announced that attempts would now be made between the General Post-office, Perth and the Windsor Hotel, South Perth (about 1 mile). In October 1899, successful tests were conducted between the Perth Yacht Club and a police launch, out to a distance of 3/4 mile. Stevens was limited by local workshop facilities and his coherer was not able to be evacuated, resulting in loss of sensitivity. He recommended acquisition of Marconi apparatus, but this in turn led to excessive establishment costs and experiments ceased at this point. The submarine cable between Rottnest Island and the mainland was officially opened in March 1900. Stevens continued to promote wireless telegraphy through public education activities, including practical demonstrations. As part of the Federal Government proposals in 1906, Stevens made enquiries of the Fremantle Harbour Trust as to their attitude to establishment of a station on Rottnest Island, which was supported.

== Personal life ==
Stevens was a member of the Claremont Municipal Council for upwards of a quarter of a century, and held the office of Mayor during the four years of the 1914-18 war. During World War I he initiated the Battalion Comforts Committee, was vice-president of the State Recruiting Committee and was an active member of the first Soldiers' Welcome Committee. He devoted a considerable amount of time to Freemasonry, and formerly was one of the foremost bowlers in the State. He was a member of the Claremont Bowling Club. Mr. Stevens was a member of the Western Australian Historical Society.

== Late life and legacy ==
Stevens died at his home in Wadella, Stirling Highway, Claremont He was aged 80 years.

== Artifacts ==
- Museums Victoria Telegram from Jenvey to Chambers, advising major improvement in signals, 1900 Museums Victoria

== Publications ==
- Stevens, George Phillip. The Reverend Edwin Foley Parker (1886) Trove
- Stevens, George Phillip. Members of Claremont Municipal Council, 1911-12 (1912) Trove
- Stevens, George Phillip. Early explorations, Eyre and Baxter (1929) Trove
- Stevens, George Phillip. Bremer Bay and Its Pioneer, John Wellstead (1941)
