= Bremer River (Western Australia) =

River in Western Australia

Coordinates: 34°23′01.67″S 119°22′30″E

Location
- Country: Australia

Physical characteristics
- Source
  - location: near Jerramungup
  - elevation: 287 m (942 ft)
- Mouth
  - location: Wellstead Estuary at Bremer Bay
- Length: 70 km (43 mi)
- Basin size: 716 km^{2} (276 sq mi)
- Discharge
  - average: 2,700 megalitres per year (95×10^{6} cu ft/a)

The Bremer River is a river in Western Australia that rises near Jerramungup at the border of the Yilgarn plateau. The river flows in a generally south-easterly direction and the river valley becomes steadily deeper as the river approaches the coast, where it has eroded the Pallinup siltstone deposits that deposited over the underlying granite.

The name Bremer River was first recorded in 1919 and is believed to come from the town of Bremer Bay that is located on the Wellstead estuary where the river flows into Bremer Bay.

The river has two minor tributaries, Devil Creek and Lizzie Creek.

About 80% of the catchment area has been cleared for agriculture, mostly for cropping and grazing.

The river is saline varying from 3-4‰ to 150‰ depending on the season.
