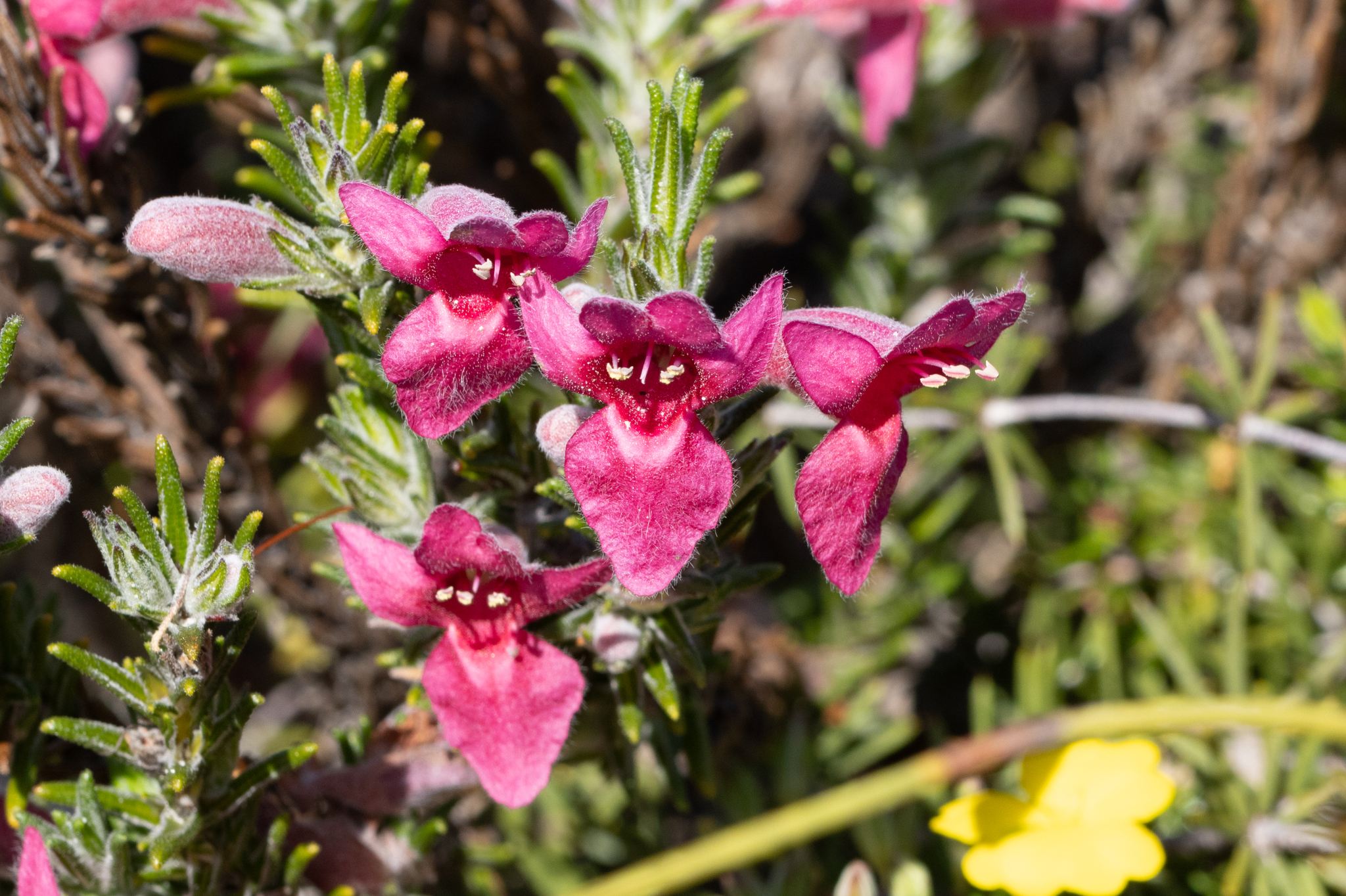
- Flowers

Scientific classification
- Kingdom: Plantae
- Clade: Tracheophytes
- Clade: Angiosperms
- Clade: Eudicots
- Clade: Asterids
- Order: Lamiales
- Family: Lamiaceae
- Genus: Hemiphora
- Species: H. exserta

Binomial name
- Hemiphora exserta (Benth.) B.J.Conn & Henwood
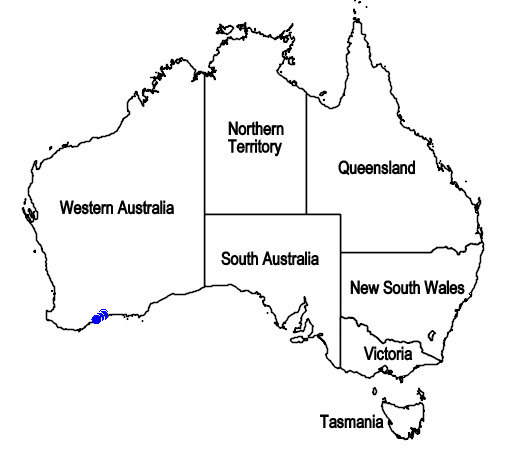

= Hemiphora exserta =

Species of flowering plant

Hemiphora exserta is a flowering plant in the mint family Lamiaceae and is endemic to the south-west of Western Australia. It is a sprawling shrub with its branches densely covered with white, woolly hairs. Its leaves are rough and wrinkled and the flowers are deep pink or dark red, curved and tube-shaped with spreading petal lobes on the end.

== Description ==
Hemiphora exserta is a sprawling shrub which grows to a height of 15–40 cm (6–20 in) with its branches covered with woolly hairs but which become glabrous with age. The leaves are linear to narrow lance-shaped, 8–40 mm (0.3–2 in) long, 1–4 mm (0.04–0.2 in) wide, with their edges strongly curved downwards. The upper surface is rough and wrinkled with small blisters and the lower surface is covered with short, soft hairs when young.

The flowers are arranged singly or in groups of up to three on woolly stalks 2–4 mm (0.08–0.2 in) long, in upper leaf axils. There are bracts 10–15 mm (0.4–0.6 in) long at the base of the flowers and which are glabrous on the inner surface and densely woolly outside, and there are shorter, glabrous bracteoles. The five sepals are 8–12 mm (0.3–0.5 in) long, and joined at their base to form a short tube. The sepals are scaly on the outside, linear to lance-shaped and remain attached to the plant after the petals have fallen. The petals are deep pink to dark red, 20–30 mm (0.8–1 in) long and joined to form a downward-curving tube, 13–17 mm (0.5–0.7 in) long and 5–6 mm (0.20–0.24 in) wide at the top end. The petal tube has soft hairs on the outside but glabrous inside except for a densely hairy ring around the ovary. The five petal lobes form two "lips", the upper lip with two short lobes and the lower with three. The lower central lobe is almost twice as large as the other four, elliptic to almost circular in shape, 9–11 mm (0.35–0.43 in) long and wide while the others are more or less egg-shaped. The four stamens are about the same length as the petal tube with the lower pair longer than the upper pair. Flowering occurs from June to November and the fruit is almost spherical, hairy and 3–4 mm (0.1–0.2 in) in diameter.

== Taxonomy and naming ==
This species was first formally described in 1870 by George Bentham who gave it the name Pityrodia uncinata var. exserta. The description was published in Flora Australiensis. In 1979, Ahmad Abid Munir raised the variety to species status as Pityrodia exserta, but in 2011, Barry Conn, Murray Henwood and Nicola Streiber transferred four species, including this one, from the genus Pityrodia into Hemiphora. The specific epithet (exserta) is a Latin word meaning "projecting" or "thrust forward".

== Distribution and habitat ==
Hemiphora exserta is found in the Fitzgerald River National Park in the Esperance Plains biogeographic region where it grows on rocky slopes and undulating plains.

== Conservation ==
Hemiphora exserta is classified as "not threatened" by the Western Australian Government Department of Parks and Wildlife.
