= Boxwood Hill, Western Australia =

Boxwood Hill
- Town
- Coordinates: 34.361°S 118.745°E
- Country: Australia
- State: Western Australia
- LGA(s): Shire of Jerramungup
- Location: 454 km (282 mi) SE of Perth; 50 km (31 mi) SSW of Jerramungup; 58 km (36 mi) W of Bremer Bay
- Established: 1963

Government
  - State electorate(s): Roe
  - Federal division(s): O'Connor

Area
  - Total: 630.7 km^{2} (243.5 sq mi)
- Elevation: 133 m (436 ft)

Population
  - Total(s): 91 (SAL 2021)
- Postcode: 6338
Localities around Boxwood Hill
Monjebup	Gairdner	Bremer Bay
Gnowellen	Boxwood Hill	Bremer Bay
Wellstead	Southern Ocean

Boxwood Hill is a town and locality in the Shire of Jerramungup, Great Southern region of Western Australia. Boxwood Hill is situated at the intersection of the South Coast Highway and the Borden-Bremer Bay Road. The Pallinup River forms the locality's south-western border, reaching the Southern Ocean at Beaufort Inlet.

The townsite was gazetted in 1963, named after a local shrub, Microcorys sp. Boxwood.

The town itself is composed of only a roadhouse and three houses, but is best known for its sporting facilities. The sports club has facilities for football, netball, hockey, cricket and tennis, and is known to host over 200 people to sporting events.
