= Gairdner River (Great Southern, Western Australia) =

River in Western Australia

Coordinates: 34°15′51.45″S 119°24′12.74″E

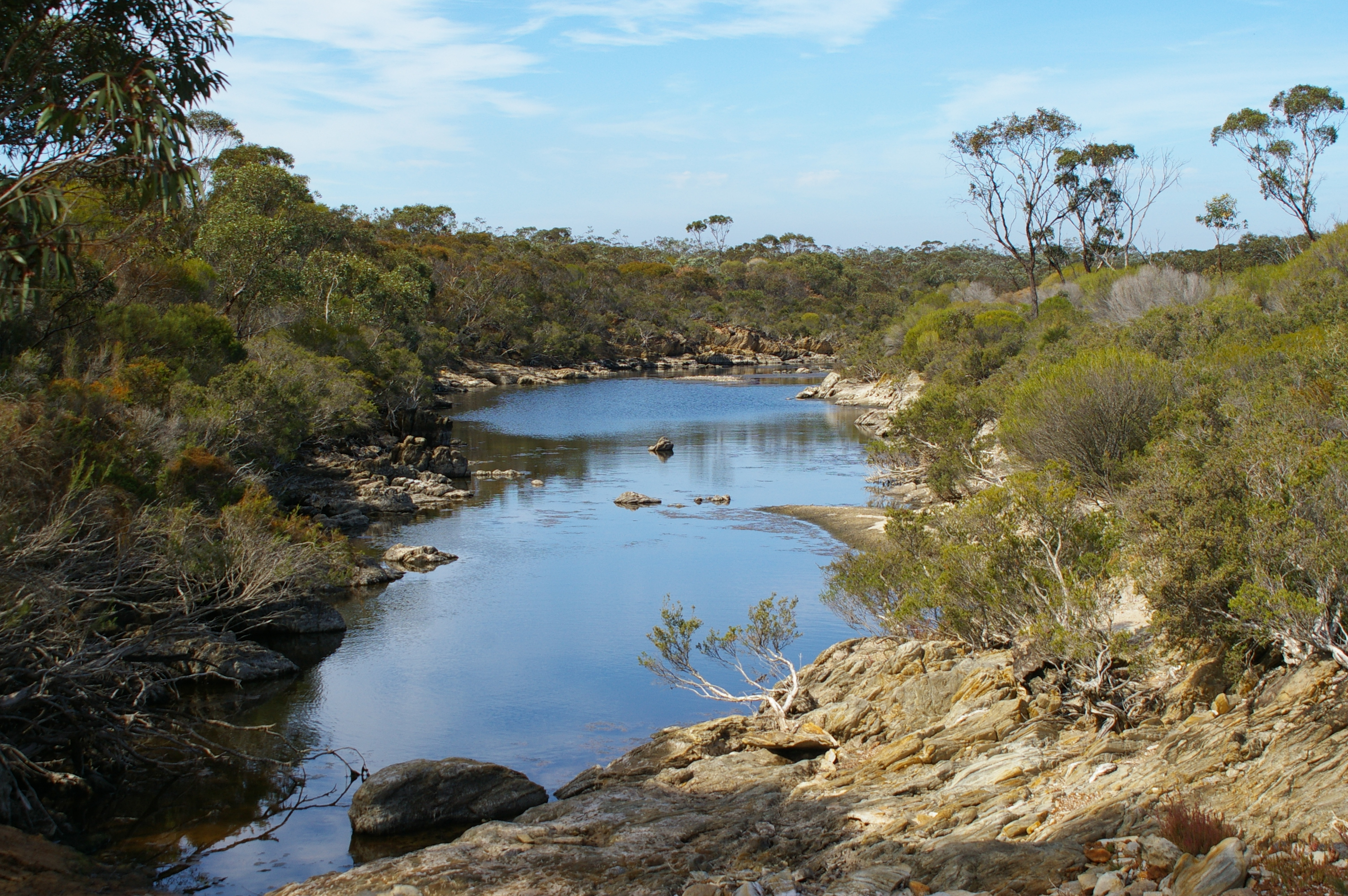
- Gairdner River near West Mount Barren

Location
- Country: Australia

Physical characteristics
- Source
  - location: Needilup-Jacup
  - elevation: 320 metres (1,050 ft)
- Mouth
  - location: Gordon Inlet
- Length: 130 kilometres (81 mi)
- Basin size: 1,770 square kilometres (683 mi^{2})
- Discharge
  - average: 940,000 ML/a (30 m^{3}/s; 1,050 cu ft/s)

Gairdner River is a river in the Great Southern region of Western Australia.

The river was first recorded by Surveyor General John Septimus Roe in 1848, when carrying out exploration of the area, noting that Aboriginal people referred to it and its numerous branches as Jeer-A-Mung-Up. Roe later named the same river Gairdner River, at its mouth in Gordon Inlet, not realising they were the same, after Gordon Gairdner, Senior Clerk of the Australian and Eastern Departments in the Colonial Office, later Chief Clerk of the Colonial Office and Secretary and Registrar of the Most Distinguished Order of Saint Michael and Saint George. Roe also named Gordon Inlet and Mount Gordon after Gairdner.

The river originates in farm land north of the South Coastal Highway between Needilup and Jacup on the Yilgarn plateau at about 320 metres (1,050 ft) above sea level. It flows in a south-easterly direction crossing the South Coast Highway east of Jerramungup then through the Fitzgerald River National Park until it terminates in Gordon Inlet, where it discharges an average of 9,400,000 cubic metres per year (10,500,000 cu ft/Ms).

The tributaries that flow into the river are Cobomup Creek, Needilup River, Pingamup River, Spring Creek, Wilgerup Creek, Scott Creek and Duleep Creek.

About 60% of the catchment has been cleared for sheep and grains farming and as a result the water quality has become saline. Salinity levels vary from 3‰ (3,000 ppm) after rains when the river is flowing to 50‰ (50,000 ppm) during the summer time.
