= Bremer Bay, Western Australia =

Bremer Bay
- Town
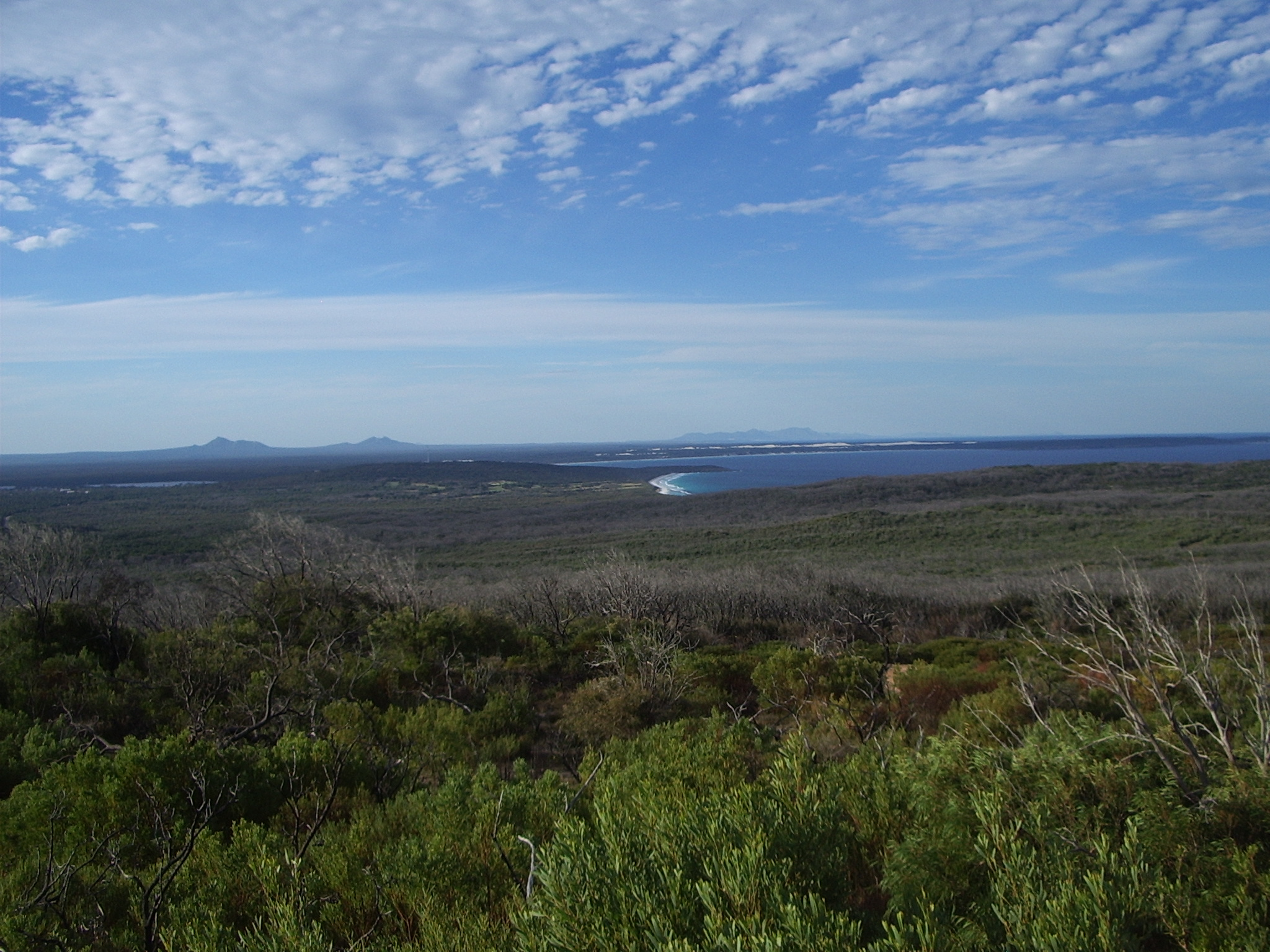
- View of Bremer Bay

- Interactive map of Bremer Bay
- Coordinates: 34.394°S 119.376°E
- Country: Australia
- State: Western Australia
- LGA: Shire of Jerramungup
- Location: 515 km (320 mi) SE of Perth; 180 km (110 mi) ENE of Albany

Government
  - State electorate: Roe
  - Federal division: O'Connor

Area
  - Total: 617.6 km^{2} (238.5 sq mi)
- Elevation: 27 m (89 ft)

Population
  - Total: 211 (UCL 2021)
- Postcode: 6338
- Mean max temp: 20.7 °C (69.3 °F)
- Mean min temp: 9.5 °C (49.1 °F)
- Annual rainfall: 606.5 mm (23.88 in)
Localities around Bremer Bay
Gairdner	Gairdner	Fitzgerald River NP
Boxwood Hill	Bremer Bay	Fitzgerald River NP
	Southern Ocean

Bremer Bay is a coastal town and locality in the Shire of Jerramungup, Great Southern region of Western Australia. It is situated on the south coast of the state, between Albany and Esperance, at the mouth of the Bremer River. Bremer Bay is 515 kilometres (320 mi) southeast of the state capital, Perth, and 180 kilometres (112 mi) east of Albany. It is on the lands of the Southern Noongar (sometimes known as the Koreng) people of the Noongar nation. The claim for Native Title was made in September 2006.

== Demographics ==
In 2016, the townsite had a population of 231. Over the 2018 Christmas and New Year holiday period, the town's population reached almost 6,500.

== European settlement ==
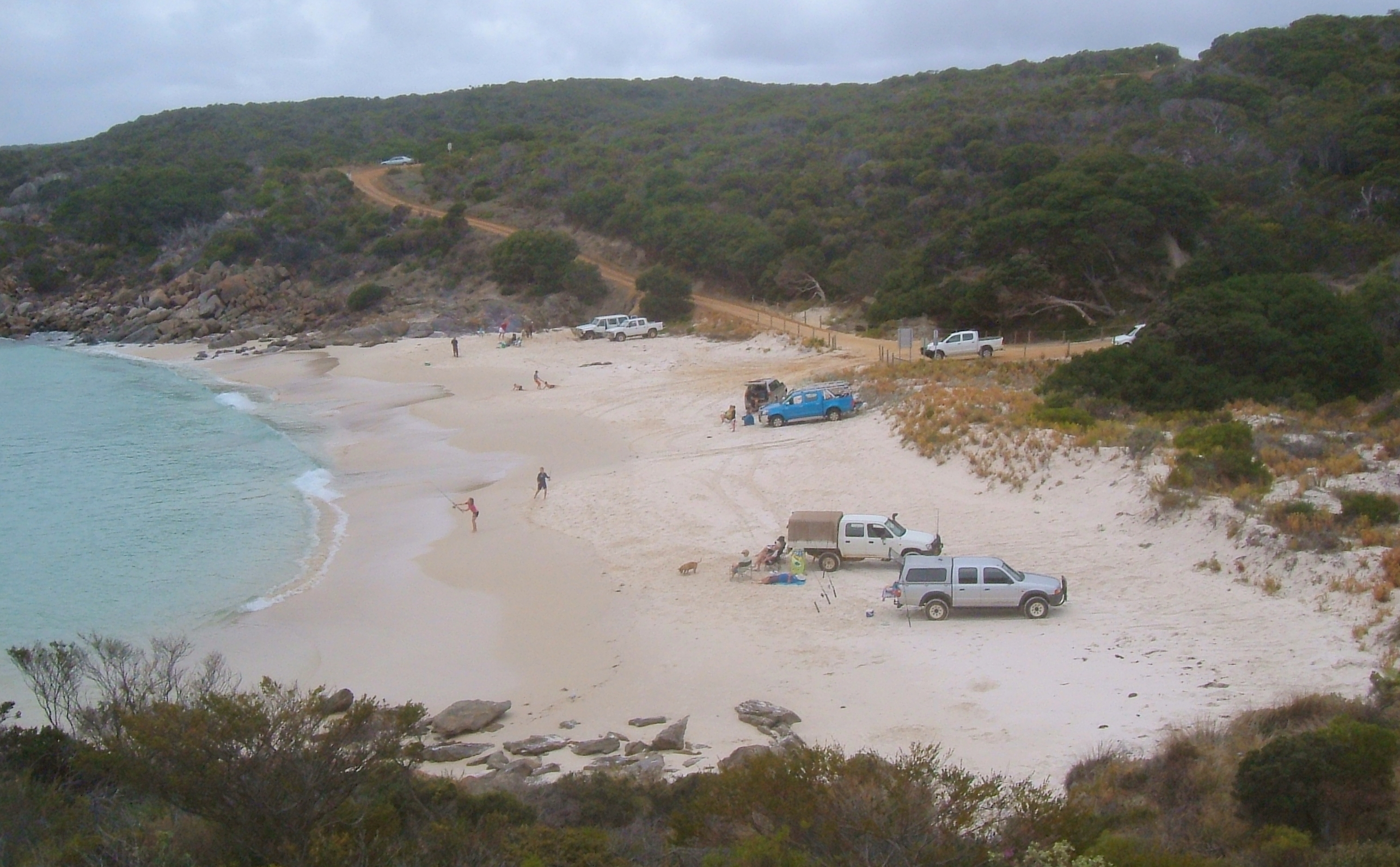
Recreational beach fishing at Dillon Bay, just east of Bremer Bay.

After visiting the area in 1831, the bay was named after Gordon Bremer by John Septimus Roe, captain of HMS Tamar, onboard which he served as a lieutenant from 1824 to 1827.

The area was first settled by Europeans in the 1850s; the Wellstead homestead, the area's first, was established in 1861.

Originally, Bremer Bay was included in the township of Wellstead; a local petition, in 1951, favoured a change to the current name, which was approved and gazetted in 1962.

In 2012, Bremer Bay was menaced for five days by a looming bushfire, just outside of town, which began when vegetation was ignited by lightning. The fire burnt through nearly 10,000 hectares (25,000 acres) of agricultural property and bushland and required 120 firefighters to contain it.

== Bremer Bay Telegraph Station, 1875 ==
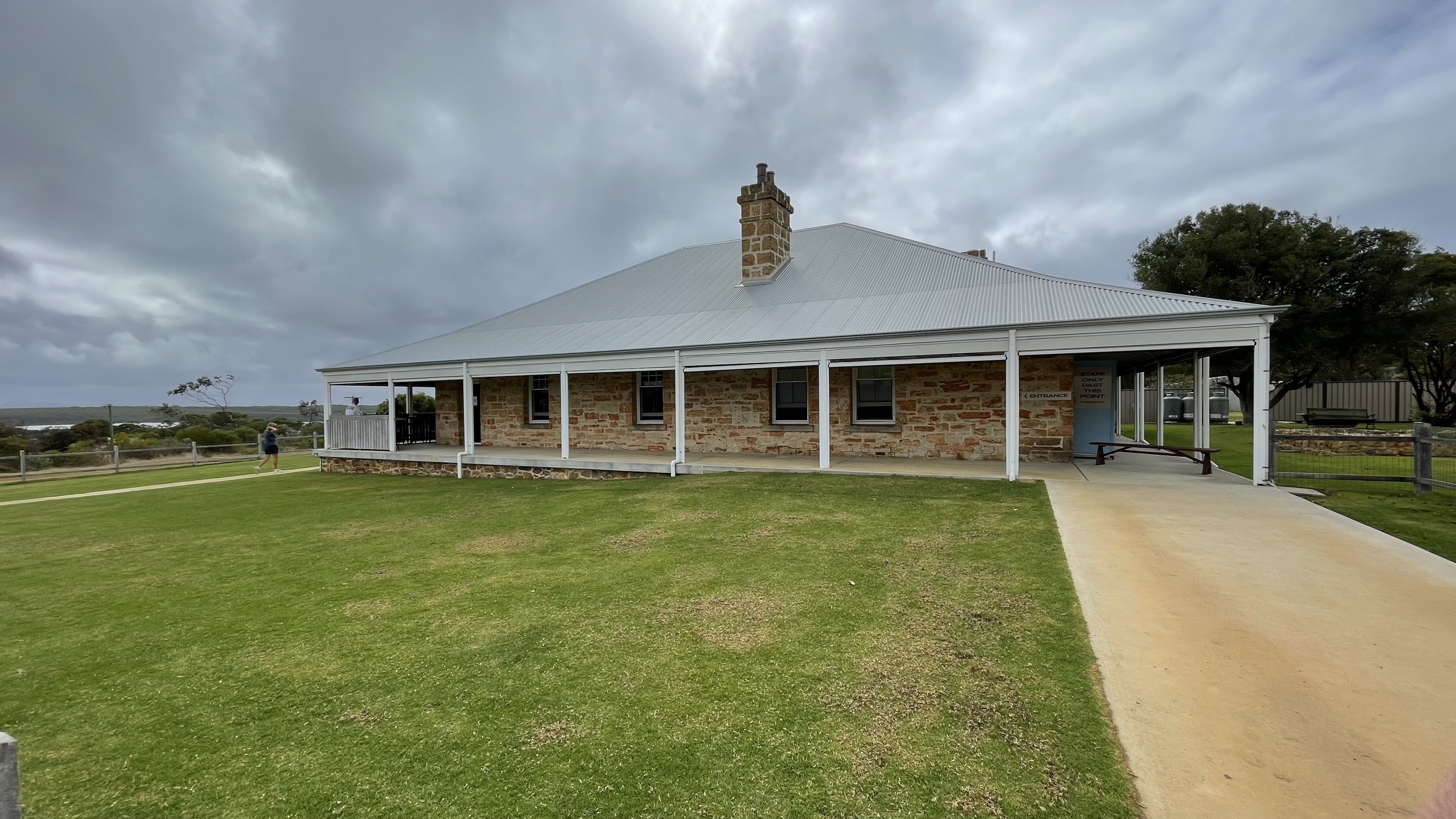
New telegraph station building

In 1874, Bremer Bay was identified as a site for a repeater station on the East–West Telegraph Line from Perth to Adelaide via Eucla. The first telegraph station was built in 1875 – it was a small timber building with a shingle roof.

The repeater stations along the East-West LIne were staffed by a station master, an assistant, linesmen and frequently Aboriginal workers. Personnel at Bremer Bay included:

- Mary Wellstead (b. 1850, d. 1894), trained by James Coates Fleming, Superintendent of Telegraphy. Mary was the telegraph operator at Bremer Bay from 1875 to 1877, and served as an assistant until 1881 when she married John James Harris.
- George Philip Stevens (c. 1861, d. 1941), known as GPS, arrived at Bremer Bay in late 1877. He would later be the Station Master at the Eucla Telegraph Station, and then Manager of Telegraphy in the Colony of Western Australia. He was still employed in government service in the 1930s.

The original station, along with several others along the line, was replaced in 1896 with a larger stone building designed by George Temple Poole.

The repeater station is still standing. Since 1986, it has been on the Register of the National Estate. It is currently a café and bakery.

== Amenities ==
Bremer Bay is known for its beautiful beaches, and the main beach is only a ten-minute walk from town. A marina at Fishery Beach offers full boating facilities. The Bremer Marine Park lies offshore. Electricity is generated by a wind-diesel hybrid system.
