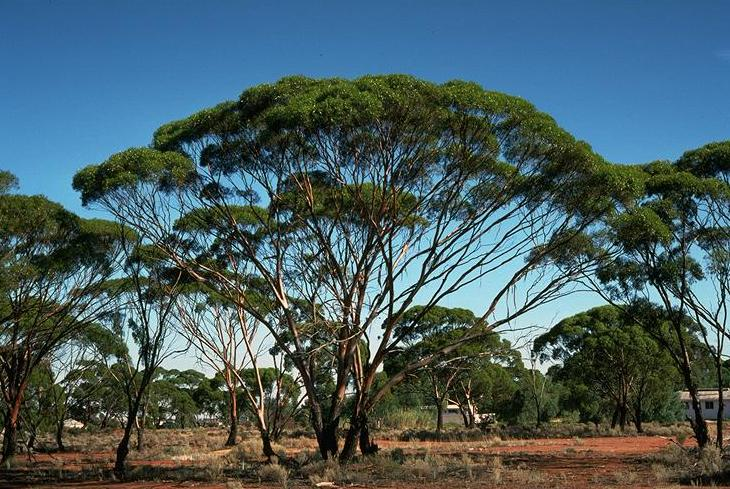
- Near Southern Cross

Conservation status
- Endangered (IUCN 3.1)

Scientific classification
- Kingdom: Plantae
- Clade: Tracheophytes
- Clade: Angiosperms
- Clade: Eudicots
- Clade: Rosids
- Order: Myrtales
- Family: Myrtaceae
- Genus: Eucalyptus
- Species: E. myriadena

Binomial name
- Eucalyptus myriadena Brooker

= Eucalyptus myriadena =

Species of eucalyptus

Eucalyptus myriadena, also known as blackbutt or small-fruited gum, is a species of mallee or tree that is native to Western Australia. It has rough, coarse flaky bark on part of the trunk, smooth bark above, linear to narrow lance-shaped adult leaves, flower buds in groups of between nine and thirteen, white flowers and narrow cylindrical to barrel-shaped fruit. It is widely distributed in the wheatbelt and goldfield areas of the state.

== Description ==
Eucalyptus myriadena is a mallee or tree that typically grows to a height of 3 to 12 metres (10 to 39 ft) and forms a lignotuber. It has rough, flaky bark on about half the lower part of the trunk, smooth bronze-grey and coppery bark above. Adult leaves are arranged alternately, linear to narrow lance-shaped, the same shade of very glossy green on both sides, 50–100 mm (2.0–3.9 in) long and 6–12 mm (0.24–0.47 in) wide, tapering to a petiole 5–10 mm (0.20–0.39 in) long and with a finely pointed apex. The side-veins are usually visible but the other veins are usually obscured by many island oil glands. The flower buds are arranged in groups of between nine and thirteen on an unbranched peduncle 5–14 mm (0.20–0.55 in) long, the individual buds on pedicels 1–4 mm (0.039–0.157 in) long. Mature buds are narrow cylindrical, 3–7 mm (0.12–0.28 in) long and 1.5–3 mm (0.059–0.118 in) wide with a conical to rounded operculum. It blooms between November and April producing white flowers. The fruit is a woody, narrow cylindrical to barrel-shaped capsule 3–6 mm (0.12–0.24 in) long and 3–4 mm (0.12–0.16 in) wide with the valves enclosed below the rim. The pale golden-brown seeds have a flattened ovoid shape and are 0.5–1.3 mm (0.020–0.051 in) long.

== Taxonomy and naming ==
This species was first formally described by the botanist Ian Brooker in 1981 in the journal Brunonia. The specific epithet is taken from the Greek myri- meaning 'many' and adena meaning 'glands' in reference to the high number of oil glands in the leaves of the plant.

In 1993, Ian Brooker described two subspecies and the names have been accepted by the Australian Plant Census:

- Eucalyptus myriadena Brooker subsp. myriadena;
- Eucalyptus myriadena subsp. parviflora Brooker & Hopper differs from subspecies myriadena in having smaller buds and fruit.

Eucalyptus myriadena is part of the subgenus Symphyomyrtus section Dumaria in a sub-group of nine closely related species called series Ovulares. The rough barked members of this series include E. myriadena, E. aequioperta, E. brachycorys, E. baudiniana and E. ovularis. The smooth barked members include E. cyclostoma, E. cylindrocarpa, E/ exigua and E. oraria.

== Distribution ==
This eucalypt is found on plains and low rises and around clay flats and salt lakes and swamps in the Mid West, Wheatbelt and Goldfields-Esperance region of Western Australia where it grows in gravelly sandy-clay-loam soils. It has a scattered distribution from Coorow in the north west to Ravensthorpe in the south extending to Coolgardie in the east.

Eucalyptus myriadena is part of open woodland communities occurring as part of the overstorey along with other trees and mallees including; E. salmonophloia, E. loxophleba, E. urna, E. calycogona, E. yilgarnensis, E. celastroides and E. vegrandis. Associated species in the variable understorey includes Rhagodia drummondii, Enchylaena lanata, E. tomentosa, Sclerolaena diacantha, Atriplex paludosa, A. vesicaria, Austrostipa elegantissima, Actinobole uliginosum, Eremophila decipiens, Scaevola spinescens, Lycium australe, Melaleuca acuminata, M. lateriflora, M. lanceolata, M. pauperiflora and Maireana erioclada.

== Use in horticulture ==
The tree is available commercially in sapling or seed form. The species is drought tolerant and can cope with saline soils. It is also planted as an oil mallee to harvest to obtain Eucalyptus oil.

== See also ==
- List of Eucalyptus species
