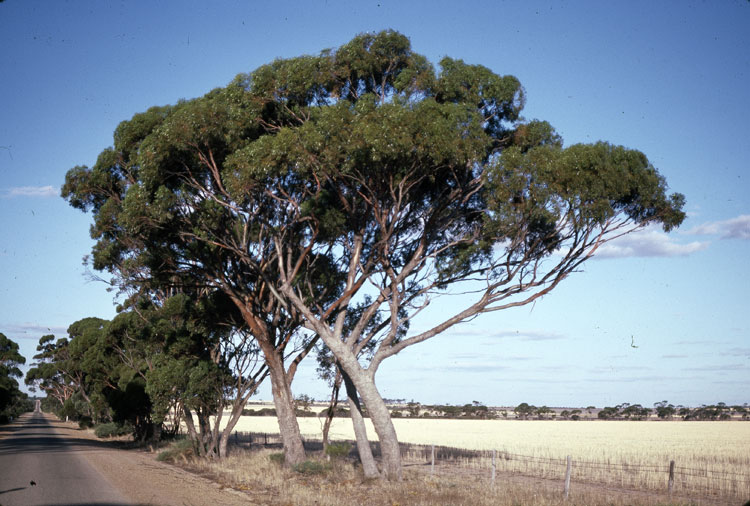
- Near Hyden

Conservation status
- Endangered (IUCN 3.1)

Scientific classification
- Kingdom: Plantae
- Clade: Tracheophytes
- Clade: Angiosperms
- Clade: Eudicots
- Clade: Rosids
- Order: Myrtales
- Family: Myrtaceae
- Genus: Eucalyptus
- Species: E. aequioperta

Binomial name
- Eucalyptus aequioperta Brooker & Hopper

= Eucalyptus aequioperta =

Welcome Hill gum

Species of eucalyptus

Eucalyptus aequioperta, commonly known as the Welcome Hill gum, is a mallee, sometimes a tree and is endemic to Western Australia. It has rough bark on the lower half of the trunk, lance-shaped leaves, flower buds in groups of between seven and fifteen, white flowers and more or less cup-shaped fruit.

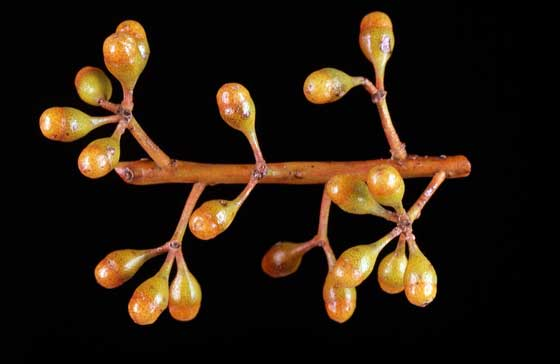
Flower buds

== Description ==
Eucalyptus aequioperta is a mallee or sometimes a tree growing to a height of 5 to 8 metres (16 to 26 ft) or more, and forms a lignotuber. The bark is a dark grey colour, firm and flaky to fibrous over the lower half of the trunk and extending to large limbs. The bark becomes slightly tessellated on older trees and on higher branches is smooth, dull and pinkish grey to white. Adult leaves are lance-shaped, glossy and a similar green on both sides. The leaf blade is linear to narrow lance-shaped or curved, 60–110 mm (2–4 in) long and 6–12 mm (0.2–0.5 in) wide with a petiole 8–17 mm (0.3–0.7 in) long. The flower buds are arranged in groups of between seven and fifteen in leaf axils, the groups on a peduncle 5–15 mm (0.2–0.6 in) long, individual buds on a pedicel 2–5 mm (0.08–0.2 in) long. The buds are "egg-in-egg cup shaped" or spindle-shaped, 5–7 mm (0.20–0.28 in) long and 2.5–3.5 mm (0.098–0.14 in) wide. The operculum is 1.5–3 mm (0.06–0.1 in) long and equal in width or narrower than the floral cup. The stamens are white. Flowering has been observed in May and the fruit are cup-shaped to cone-shaped with the narrower end towards the base, 4–5 mm (0.16–0.20 in) long and 5–6 mm (0.20–0.24 in) wide.

== Taxonomy ==
Eucalyptus aequioperta was first formally described by the botanists Ian Brooker and Stephen Hopper in 1993 in the journal Nuytsia. The type specimen was collected by Brooker near Mount Walker, north of Hyden in 1985. According to Brooker and Hopper, the specific epithet (aequioperta) means "equal cover", but Francis Sharr noted that "the precise meaning is unclear".

Eucalyptus aequioperta is part of the subgenus Symphyomyrtus section Dumaria in a sub-group of nine closely related species called series Ovulares. The rough barked members of this series include E. aequioperta, E. baudiniana, E. brachycorys, E. myriadena and E. ovularis and the smooth barked members include E. cyclostoma, E. cylindrocarpa, E. exigua and E. oraria.

== Distribution and habitat ==
The Welcome Hill gum grows in red sand on sandhills in the Avon Wheatbelt, Coolgardie and Mallee biogeographic regions of Western Australia. It is found in an area between Corrigin in the west, Southern Cross and Coolgardie in the east but its distribution is not well known and may extend even further east.

== Conservation status ==
This eucalypt is classified as "not threatened" by the Western Australian Government Department of Parks and Wildlife. The IUCN Red List assesses the species as endangered.

== See also ==
- List of Eucalyptus species
