= Eucalyptus suggrandis =

Conservation status
- Vulnerable (IUCN 3.1)

Scientific classification
- Kingdom: Plantae
- Clade: Tracheophytes
- Clade: Angiosperms
- Clade: Eudicots
- Clade: Rosids
- Order: Myrtales
- Family: Myrtaceae
- Genus: Eucalyptus
- Species: E. suggrandis

Binomial name
- Eucalyptus suggrandis L.A.S.Johnson & K.D.Hill

Species of eucalyptus

Eucalyptus suggrandis is a species of mallee that is endemic to the southwest of Western Australia. It has smooth, shiny bark, linear to elliptical leaves, flower buds in groups of three or seven, creamy white flowers and cup-shaped to conical fruit.

== Description ==
Eucalyptus suggrandis is a mallee that typically grows to a height of 1–5 m (3 ft 3 in – 16 ft 5 in) and forms a lignotuber. It has smooth shiny, greyish, to brownish bark. Young plants and coppice regrowth have more or less sessile, linear to narrow elliptical leaves that are 40–70 mm (1.6–2.8 in) long and 5–10 mm (0.20–0.39 in) wide. Adult leaves are the same shade of glossy green on both sides, linear to elliptical, 40–85 mm (1.6–3.3 in) long and 4–25 mm (0.16–0.98 in) wide tapering to a petiole up to 9 mm (0.35 in) long. The flower buds are arranged in leaf axils in groups of three or seven on a flattened, unbranched peduncle 5–20 mm (0.20–0.79 in) long, the individual buds on flattened pedicels 3–8 mm (0.12–0.31 in) long. Mature buds are oval to spindle-shaped, 11–20 mm (0.43–0.79 in) long and 4–7 mm (0.16–0.28 in) wide with a more or less warty operculum that is about twice as long as the floral cup. Flowering occurs between November and March and the flowers are creamy white. The fruit is a woody, cup-shaped to conical capsule 6–12 mm (0.24–0.47 in) long and 5–9 mm (0.20–0.35 in) wide with the valves near rim level.

== Taxonomy and naming ==
Eucalyptus suggrandis was first formally described in 1992 by Lawrie Johnson and Ken Hill in the journal Telopea from specimens collected by Hill in the Fitzgerald River National Park in 1988. The specific epithet (suggrandis) is from Latin meaning "rather large", referring to the size of the buds compared to those of the related E. spathulata and E. vergrandis.

In the same paper, Johnson and Hill described two subspecies, but only the autonym is accepted, the other subspecies having been raised to species status as Eucalyptus alipes. In 2005, Dean Nicolle and Ian Brooker described a second subspecies. The names of the two subspecies are accepted by the Australian Plant Census:

- Eucalyptus suggrandis subsp. promiscua D.Nicolle & Brooker has flower buds in groups of three;
- Eucalyptus suggrandis L.A.S.Johnson & K.D.Hill subsp. suggrandis has flower buds in groups of seven.

== Distribution and habitat ==
This mallee is found on sandplains, rises, along drainage lines and in breakaways in the Goldfields-Esperance and Wheatbelt regions where it grows in sandy-clay-loam soils over quartzite, laterite or granite. Subspecies promiscua has a more westerly distribution between Pingaring, Jerramungup and Lake King.

== Conservation status ==
This eucalypt species and both subspecies are classified as "not threatened" by the Western Australian Government Department of Parks and Wildlife. The IUCN Red List assesses the species as Vulnerable.

== See also ==
- List of Eucalyptus species
