= Eucalyptus ovularis =

Small-fruited mallee

Scientific classification
- Kingdom: Plantae
- Clade: Tracheophytes
- Clade: Angiosperms
- Clade: Eudicots
- Clade: Rosids
- Order: Myrtales
- Family: Myrtaceae
- Genus: Eucalyptus
- Species: E. ovularis

Binomial name
- Eucalyptus ovularis Maiden & Blakely

Species of eucalyptus

Eucalyptus ovularis, commonly known as small-fruited mallee, is a species of mallee or a tree that is native to Western Australia.

== Description ==
Eucalyptus ovularis is a tree or mallee that typically grows to a height of 3 to 15 m (9.8 to 49.2 ft) and forms a lignotuber. It has dark grey, rough and flaky bark at the base that becomes white-pinkish-grey and smooth above. The glossy, green adult leaves are alternately arranged. The leaf blade has a linear to narrowly lanceolate shape with a length of 6 to 10 cm (2.4 to 3.9 in) and a width of 0.5 to 1.0 cm (0.20 to 0.39 in) with a base tapering to the petiole and a fine pointed apex. It blooms between September and May producing white flowers. The axillary unbranched inflorescences occur in groups of 9 to 13 buds per umbel. The ovoid to cylindrically shaped mature buds have a length of 0.45 to 0.8 cm (0.18 to 0.31 in) and a width of 0.25 to 0.4 cm (0.098 to 0.157 in) with a rounded to conical operculum and inflexed stamens and oblong anthers. The fruits that form after flowering are barrel-shaped to slightly urceolate, 0.4 to 0.6 cm (0.16 to 0.24 in) in length and 0.4 to 0.5 cm (0.16 to 0.20 in) wide with a vertically descending disc and three enclosed valves. The brown seeds within have a flattened ovoid shape and are 0.8 to 1.5 mm (0.031 to 0.059 in) in length.

== Taxonomy ==
Eucalyptus ovularis was first formally described by the botanists Joseph Maiden and William Blakely in 1925 in the Journal and Proceedings of the Royal Society of New South Wales. The specific epithet (ovularis) is from Latin meaning "resembing an ovule".

Eucalyptus ovularis is part of the subgenus Symphyomyrtus section Dumaria in a sub-group of nine closely related species called series Ovulares. The rough barked members of this series include E. ovularis, E. aequioperta, E. brachycorys, E. myriadena and E. baudiniana. The smooth barked members include E. cyclostoma, E. cylindrocarpa, E. exigua and E. oraria.

== Distribution ==
The tree has a scattered distribution in southern parts of the Goldfields-Esperance region between Ravensthorpe in the west, Coolgardie in the north to around Cape Arid in the east where it is found on plains growing in sandy or loamy soils over and around limestone.

== See also ==
- List of Eucalyptus species
