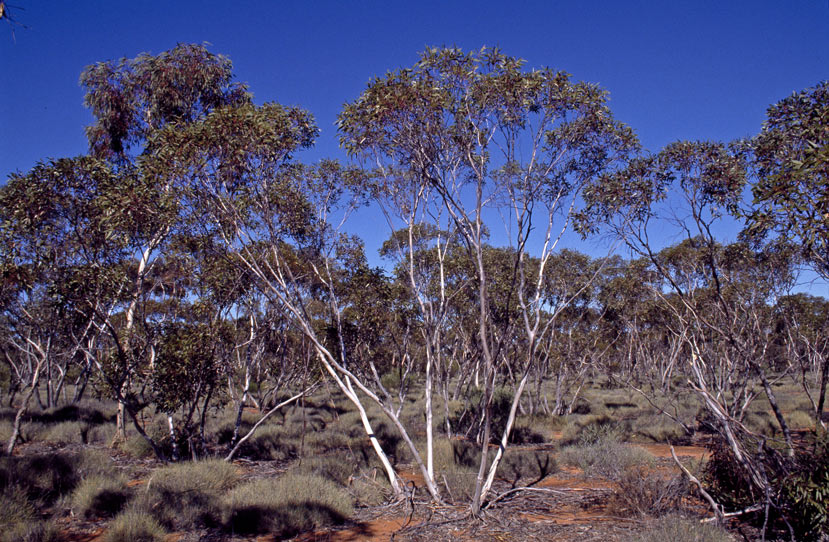
- Eucalyptus cyclostoma near Zanthus

Scientific classification
- Kingdom: Plantae
- Clade: Embryophytes
- Clade: Tracheophytes
- Clade: Spermatophytes
- Clade: Angiosperms
- Clade: Eudicots
- Clade: Rosids
- Order: Myrtales
- Family: Myrtaceae
- Genus: Eucalyptus
- Species: E. cyclostoma

Binomial name
- Eucalyptus cyclostoma Brooker

= Eucalyptus cyclostoma =

Species of eucalyptus

Eucalyptus cyclostoma is a species of mallee that is endemic to an area in the south of Western Australia. It has smooth, greyish bark, lance-shaped adult leaves, flower buds in groups of between seven and eleven, white flowers and more or less spherical fruit.

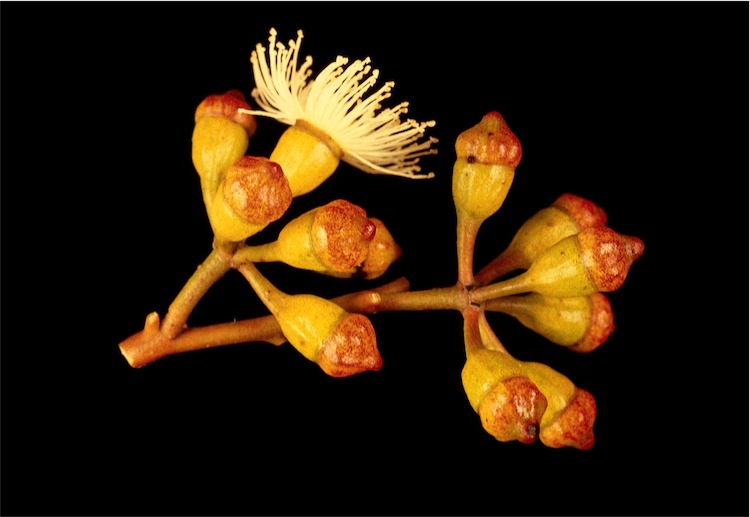
Flower buds

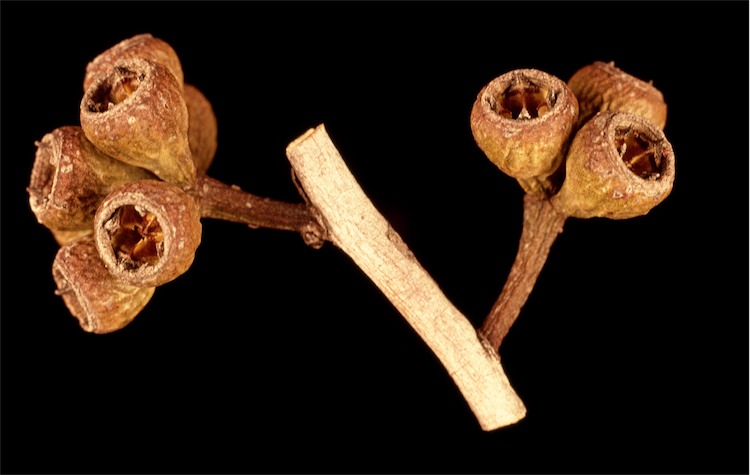
Fruit

== Description ==
Eucalyptus cyclostoma is a mallee that typically grows to a height of 1.5 to 4 metres (5 to 13 ft) and has a lignotuber. It has whitish-grey-cream, brown and pinkish grey coloured bark that is flaky to ribbony can be rough or smooth. The adult leaves are arranged alternately, the same dull, bluish green on both surfaces, lance-shaped, 6 to 10 cm (2.4 to 3.9 in) long and 1 to 1.5 cm (0.39 to 0.59 in) wide with a base that tapers to the petiole and a pointed apex. It blooms between February and April and produces white flowers. The flower buds are arranged in groups of between seven and eleven on an unbranched peduncle 8–20 mm (0.31–0.79 in) long, the individual buds on a pedicel 3–7 mm (0.12–0.28 in) long. Mature buds are cylindrical to pear-shaped with a beaked operculum with inflexed stamens and oblong anthers. The fruits that form after flowering are shaped like a truncated sphere 0.8 to 1 cm (0.31 to 0.39 in) long and 0.7 to 1 cm (0.28 to 0.39 in) wide on a pedicel 3–8 mm (0.12–0.31 in) long. The fruit has three or four valves at about the level of the rim. The brown seeds inside have a flattened ovoid shape and a length of 1 to 2 mm (0.039 to 0.079 in).

== Taxonomy ==
The species was first formally described by the botanist Ian Brooker in 1981 in the journal Brunonia from a specimen he collected west of Balladonia in 1970. The specific epithet (cyclostoma) is derived from the Ancient Greek words kyklos meaning "circle" or "ring" and stoma meaning "mouth" in reference to the marked rim of the fruit.

Eucalyptus cyclostoma is part of the subgenus Symphyomyrtus section Dumaria in a sub-group of nine closely related species in the series Ovulares. The other members of this series include the smooth barked E. cylindrocarpa, E. exigua and E. oraria, and the rough barked E. ovularis, E. aequioperta, E. brachycorys, E. myriadena and E. baudiniana.

== Distribution ==
This eucalypt is found on limestone plains on the south western Goldfields-Esperance region of Western Australia growing in sandy loam or red sand soils. It has a limited range around Balladonia and Zanthus where it forms part of low woodland communities.

== See also ==
- List of Eucalyptus species
