= Eucalyptus exigua =

Conservation status
- Priority Three — Poorly Known Taxa (DEC)

Scientific classification
- Kingdom: Plantae
- Clade: Tracheophytes
- Clade: Angiosperms
- Clade: Eudicots
- Clade: Rosids
- Order: Myrtales
- Family: Myrtaceae
- Genus: Eucalyptus
- Species: E. exigua

Binomial name
- Eucalyptus exigua Brooker & Hopper

Species of eucalyptus

Eucalyptus exigua is a species of mallee that is endemic to Western Australia. It has smooth, whitish bark, linear to narrow lance-shaped adult leaves, flower buds in groups of between seven and eleven, white flowers and short barrel-shaped to conical fruit.

== Description ==
Eucalyptus exigua is a mallee that typically grows to a height of 2–5 m (6 ft 7 in – 16 ft 5 in) and forms a lignotuber. It has smooth, white to grey bark on the trunk and branches. Young plants and coppice regrowth have petiolate, narrow elliptical to lance-shaped leaves that are 35–60 mm (1.4–2.4 in) long and 7–15 mm (0.28–0.59 in) wide. Adult leaves are arranged alternately, linear to narrow lance-shaped, the same dull to glossy green colour on both sides, 40–90 mm (1.6–3.5 in) long and 5–13 mm (0.20–0.51 in) wide on a petiole 5–17 mm (0.20–0.67 in) long. The flower buds are arranged in leaf axils in groups of seven, nine or eleven on an unbranched peduncle 5–15 mm (0.20–0.59 in) long, the individual buds on a thick pedicel 3–5 mm (0.12–0.20 in) long. Mature buds are more or less cylindrical, 6–7 mm (0.24–0.28 in) long and 4–5 mm (0.16–0.20 in) wide with a flattened operculum with a short point in the centre. Flowering occurs in March and the flowers are white. The fruit is a woody, shortly barrel-shaped to conical capsule 5–7 mm (0.20–0.28 in) long and 5–8 mm (0.20–0.31 in) wide with and a descending disc and four valves at rim level. The brown seeds within have a flattened ovoid shape and are 0.5–1.5 mm (0.020–0.059 in) long.

== Taxonomy ==
Eucalyptus exigua was first formally described in 1993 by the botanists Ian Brooker and Stephen Hopper in the journal Nuytsia from a specimen collected by Brooker near the road between Hyden and Norseman. The specific epithet (exigua) is from the Latin word exiguus meaning "small" or "feeble", referring to the habit of this species compared to the similar Eucalyptus brachycorys.

Eucalyptus exigua is part of the subgenus Symphyomyrtus section Dumaria in a sub-group of nine closely related species called series Ovulares. The smooth-barked members of this series include E. exigua, E. cyclostoma, E. cylindrocarpa and E. oraria and rough-barked members include E. ovularis, E. aequioperta, E. brachycorys, E. myriadena and E. baudiniana.

== Distribution and habitat ==
This mallee is found on sandplains mainly east of Hyden in the Wheatbelt and Goldfields-Esperance regions of Western Australia, where it grows in sandy loamy soils.

== Conservation status ==
This eucalypt is classified as "Priority Three" by the Western Australian Government Department of Parks and Wildlife meaning that it is poorly known and known from only a few locations but is not under imminent threat.

== See also ==
- List of Eucalyptus species
