= Eucalyptus hypolaena =

Scientific classification
- Kingdom: Plantae
- Clade: Tracheophytes
- Clade: Angiosperms
- Clade: Eudicots
- Clade: Rosids
- Order: Myrtales
- Family: Myrtaceae
- Genus: Eucalyptus
- Species: E. hypolaena

Binomial name
- Eucalyptus hypolaena L.A.S.Johnson & K.D.Hill

Species of eucalyptus

Eucalyptus hypolaena is a species of tree or mallee that is endemic to Western Australia. It has hard, dark grey bark near the base of the trunk, smooth bark above, lance-shaped adult leaves, flower buds arranged in groups of seven, pale yellow flowers and shortened spherical to barrel-shaped fruit.

== Description ==
Eucalyptus hypolaena is a tree or mallee that typically grows to a height of 15 m (49 ft) and forms a lignotuber. It has rough, dark grey, fibrous, scaly and flaky bark on the lowest 2–3 m (6 ft 7 in – 9 ft 10 in) of the trunk, smooth white to grey or pale pink bark above. Young plants and coppice regrowth have stems that are more or less square in cross-section and leaves that are lance-shaped to egg-shaped, dull, glaucous, 40–100 mm (1.6–3.9 in) long and 20–40 mm (0.79–1.57 in) wide. Adult leaves are arranged alternately, lance-shaped, the same shade of dull green on both sides, 80–160 mm (3.1–6.3 in) long and 13–30 mm (0.51–1.18 in) wide on a petiole 20–30 mm (0.79–1.18 in) long. The flower buds are arranged in leaf axils in groups of seven on a peduncle 5–13 mm (0.20–0.51 in) long, the individual buds on pedicels 5–10 mm (0.20–0.39 in) long. Mature buds are oval, 13–25 mm (0.51–0.98 in) long and 6–8 mm (0.24–0.31 in) wide with a beaked to horn-shaped operculum 7–18 mm (0.28–0.71 in) long. Flowering occurs between May and September and the flowers are pale yellow. The fruit is a woody, shortened spherical to barrel-shaped capsule, 7–10 mm (0.28–0.39 in) long and 8–12 mm (0.31–0.47 in) wide with the valves protruding well beyond the rim.

== Taxonomy and naming ==
Eucalyptus hypolaena was first formally described in 1999 by Lawrie Johnson and Ken Hill in the journal Telopea. The type specimen was collected in 1983 near the Transcontinental Railway, about 57 km (35 mi) east of Karonie. The specific epithet is from the ancient Greek hypo meaning "under" and (ch)laina meaning " a cloak", referring to the hard bark at the base of the trunk.

== Distribution and habitat ==
This mallee grows in mallee woodland in red, sandy loam with other eucalypts, including E. yilgarnensis and E. celastroides. It is found to the east and north of Kalgoorlie and into the Great Victoria Desert in the Coolgardie, Great Victoria Desert and Murchison biogeographical regions.

== Conservation status ==
Eucalyptus hypolaena is classified as "not threatened" by the Western Australian Government Department of Parks and Wildlife,

== See also ==
- List of Eucalyptus species
