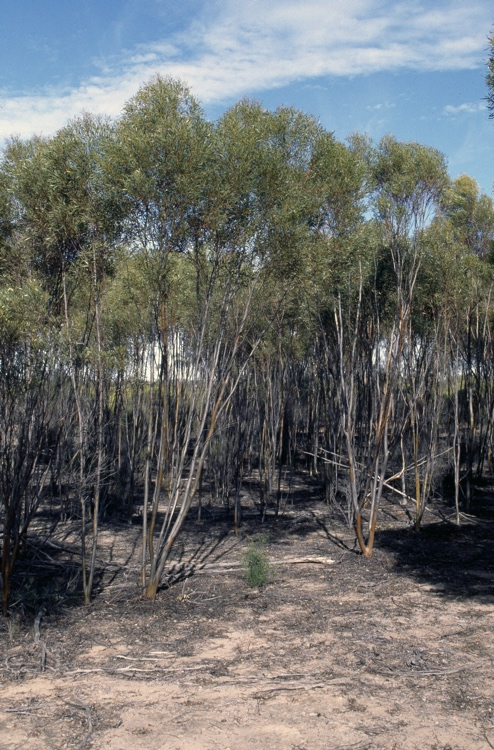
- Near Varley Rock

Conservation status
- Vulnerable (IUCN 3.1)

Scientific classification
- Kingdom: Plantae
- Clade: Tracheophytes
- Clade: Angiosperms
- Clade: Eudicots
- Clade: Rosids
- Order: Myrtales
- Family: Myrtaceae
- Genus: Eucalyptus
- Species: E. alipes

Binomial name
- Eucalyptus alipes (L.A.S.Johnson & K.D.Hill) D.Nicolle & Brooker

= Eucalyptus alipes =

Species of eucalyptus

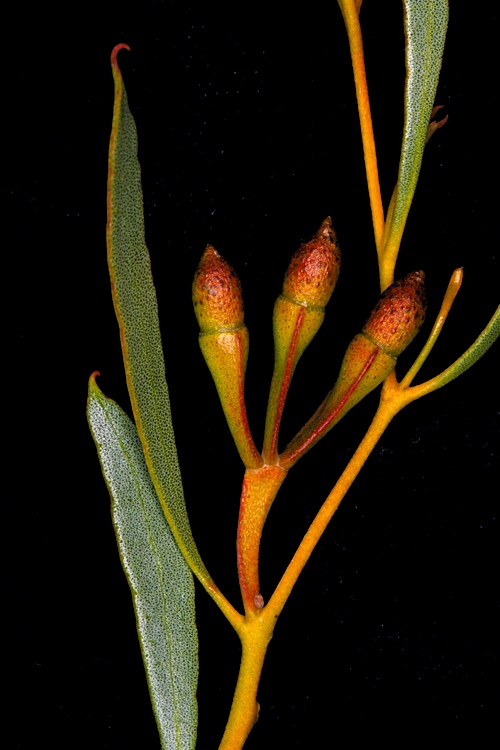
Flower buds

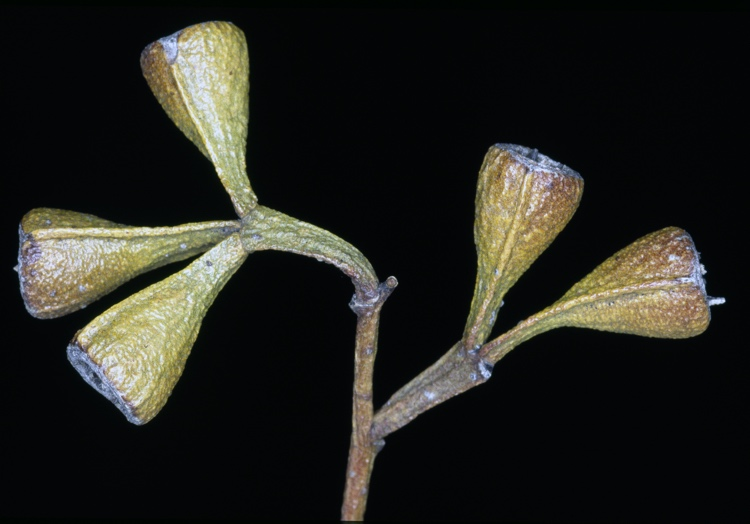
Fruit

Eucalyptus alipes, also known as Hyden mallet, is a mallet that is endemic to the south-west of Western Australia. It has smooth grey to light brown or bronze bark, linear to narrow elliptic leaves, oval to spindle-shaped buds with a long, narrow operculum and conical fruits.

== Description ==
Eucalyptus alipes is a mallet that grows to a height of up to 8 m (30 ft) and lacks a lignotuber. It has smooth grey to light brown or bronze bark. The leaves on young plants and on coppice regrowth under 1 m (3 ft) tall are linear to narrow elliptic, 45–80 mm (2–3 in) long and 5–80 mm (0.2–3 in) wide. Adult leaves are linear to narrow elliptic or lance-shaped, 30–75 mm (1–3 in) long and 4–11 mm (0.2–0.4 in) wide with a petiole up to 8 mm (0.3 in) long. The flowers are arranged in groups of three in leaf axils on a peduncle 0.5–2.5 mm (0.02–0.1 in) long, individual flowers on a pedicel up to 8 mm (0.31 in) long with two wings on the sides. The buds are oval to spindle-shaped, 13–21 mm (0.51–0.83 in) long and 5–7 mm (0.20–0.28 in) wide at maturity. The operculum is cylindrical to hemispherical, up to twice as long as the flower cup but narrower than it at the join. Flowering occurs from December or January to February and the flowers are creamy white. The fruit is a cone-shaped capsule, 10–12 mm (0.39–0.47 in) long and 7–8 mm (0.28–0.31 in) wide with two ribs along its sides.

== Taxonomy and naming ==
This eucalypt was first formally described in 1992 by Ken Hill and Lawrie Johnson and given the name Eucalyptus suggrandis subsp. alipes. In 2005, Dean Nicolle and Ian Brooker raised the subspecies to species status as Eucalyptus alipes. The specific epithet (alipes) is a Latin word meaning "wing-footed" referring to the pedicels.

== Distribution and habitat ==
Eucalyptus alipes often grows in pure stands in saline soils and along saline drainage lines and is found between Hyden, Coolgardie, and Norseman as well as south to Lake King and west to Narembeen.

== Conservation ==
Eucalyptus alipes is classified as 'not threatene' by the Western Australian Government Department of Parks and Wildlife.

== See also ==
- List of Eucalyptus species
