= Eucalyptus vegrandis =

Ongerup mallee

Scientific classification
- Kingdom: Plantae
- Clade: Tracheophytes
- Clade: Angiosperms
- Clade: Eudicots
- Clade: Rosids
- Order: Myrtales
- Family: Myrtaceae
- Genus: Eucalyptus
- Species: E. vegrandis

Binomial name
- Eucalyptus vegrandis L.A.S.Johnson & K.D.Hill

Species of eucalyptus

Eucalyptus vegrandis, commonly known as the Ongerup mallee or Cranbrook mallee, is a species of mallee that is endemic to the south-west of Western Australia. It has smooth bark, linear to lance-shaped adult leaves, flower buds in groups of seven, creamy white flowers and cup-shaped or conical fruit.

== Description ==
Eucalyptus vergrandis is a mallee that typically grows to a height of 1.5–6 m (4 ft 11 in – 19 ft 8 in), forms a lignotuber and has greenish to yellowish bark. The adult leaves are glossy green, linear to lance-shaped or elliptical, 30–80 mm (1.2–3.1 in) long and 4–15 mm (0.16–0.59 in) wide tapering to a petiole 1–18 mm (0.039–0.709 in) long. The flower buds are arranged in leaf axils in groups of seven on an unbranched peduncle 5–20 mm (0.20–0.79 in) long, the individual buds on pedicels 3–5 mm (0.12–0.20 in) long. Mature buds are elongated, 10–12 mm (0.39–0.47 in) long and 4–5 mm (0.16–0.20 in) wide with a conical, horn-shaped or rounded operculum that is narrower than the floral cup at the join. Flowering occurs in October or February and the flowers are creamy white. The fruit is a woody cup-shaped or conical capsule 6–9 mm (0.24–0.35 in) long and 6–8 mm (0.24–0.31 in) wide with the valves close to rim level.

== Taxonomy and naming ==
Eucalyptus vegrandis was first formally described in 1992 by Lawrie Johnson and Ken Hill from specimens collected 5 km (3.1 mi) north-west of Ongerup in 1983. The specific epithet (vegrandis) is a Latin word meaning "not very large" referring to its small stature.

In 2005, Dean Nicolle and Ian Brooker described two subspecies and the names have been accepted by the Australian Plant Census:

- Eucalyptus vegrandis subsp. recondita D.Nicolle & Brooker has broad, elliptical adult leaves and larger flower buds and fruit;
- Eucalyptus vegrandis L.A.S.Johnson & K.D.Hill subsp. vegrandis has linear to narrow elliptical leaves and small buds and fruit.

== Distribution and habitat ==
Ongerup mallee grows in low-lying places, often with saltbush and is found between Jerramungup, Katanning, Cranbrook and Boxwood Hill. Subspecies vegrandis occurs between Ongerup, Katanning Nyabing, Jerramungup and the Bremer River. Subspecies recondita occurs from Cranbrook to the north and south of the Stirling Range but not on the Range itself.

== Conservation status ==
Eucalyptus vegrandis and its two subspecies are listed as "not threatened" by the Western Australian Government Department of Parks and Wildlife.

== See also ==
- List of Eucalyptus species
