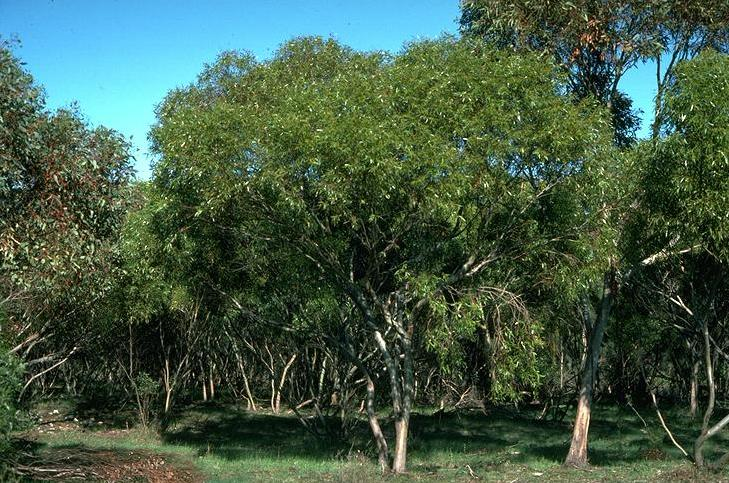
- Eucalyptus oraria south of Dongara

Scientific classification
- Kingdom: Plantae
- Clade: Tracheophytes
- Clade: Angiosperms
- Clade: Eudicots
- Clade: Rosids
- Order: Myrtales
- Family: Myrtaceae
- Genus: Eucalyptus
- Species: E. oraria

Binomial name
- Eucalyptus oraria L.A.S.Johnson

Synonyms
- Eucalyptus tamala D.J.Carr & S.G.M.Carr

= Eucalyptus oraria =

Ooragmandee

Species of eucalyptus

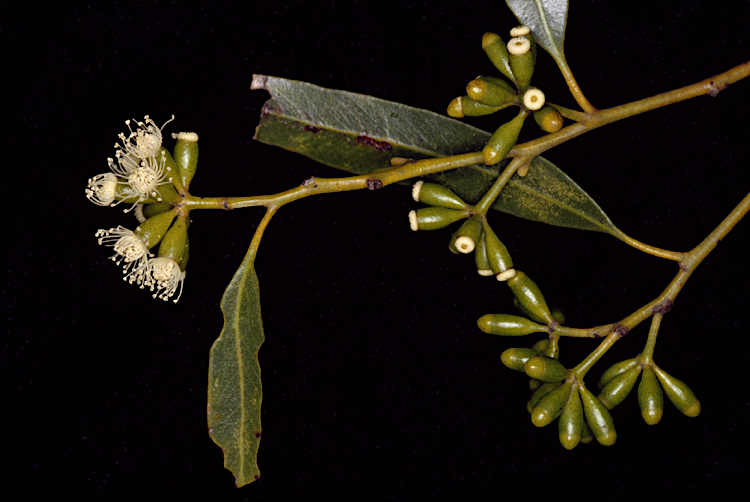
Flowers and buds

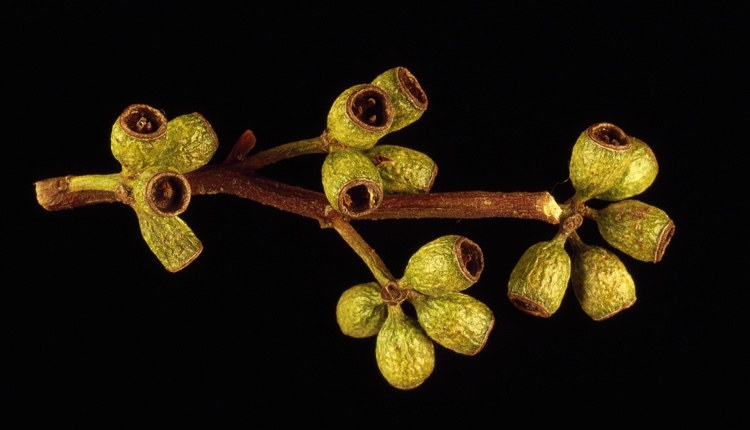
Fruit in Kalbarri National Park

Eucalyptus oraria, commonly known as ooragmandee, is a species of mallee that is endemic to coastal and near-coastal areas of Western Australia. It has smooth greyish bark, sometimes with rough, flaky bark on the base of the trunk, lance-shaped adult leaves, flower buds in groups of nine or more, white flowers and barrel-shaped fruit.

== Description ==
Eucalyptus oraria is a mallee, rarely a tree or low shrub that typically grows to a height of 1–15 mm (0.039–0.591 in) and forms a lignotuber. It has smooth, greyish bark that is shed in strips, sometimes with rough, flaky bark on the base of the trunk. Young plants and coppice regrowth have dull green, egg-shaped to lance-shaped leaves that are 50–90 mm (2.0–3.5 in) long and 13–35 mm (0.51–1.38 in) wide. Adult leaves are the same shade of glossy green on both sides, lance-shaped, 65–100 mm (2.6–3.9 in) long and 8–23 mm (0.31–0.91 in) wide, tapering to a petiole 8–15 mm (0.31–0.59 in) long. The flower buds are arranged in leaf axils in groups of between nine and nineteen or more on an unbranched peduncle 5–15 mm (0.20–0.59 in) long, the individual buds on pedicels 1–3 mm (0.039–0.118 in) long. Mature buds are oval, 4–7 mm (0.16–0.28 in) long and 2–4 mm (0.079–0.157 in) wide with a rounded operculum. Flowering mainly occurs from August to October and the flowers are white. The fruit is a woody, barrel-shaped capsule with the valves below the level of the rim.

== Taxonomy and naming ==
Eucalyptus oraria was first formally described in 1962 by Lawrie Johnson from specimens he collected near Dongara in 1960. The specific epithet (oraria) is from the Latin orarius meaning "pertaining to the coast".

== Distribution and habitat ==
Ooragmandee grows in sand in coastal and near-coastal areas, often over limestone and is found from near Jurien Bay to near Kalbarri and on some nearby offshore islands.

== See also ==
- List of Eucalyptus species
